= List of churches in Teignbridge =

The following is a list of churches in Teignbridge.

== Active churches ==
There are churches in every civil parish. The district has an estimated 116 churches for 129,600 people, a ratio of one church to every 1,117 people.

Name	Civil parish	Web	Dedication	Founded	Denomination	Benefice	Notes
Blessed Virgin Mary, Abbotskerswell	Abbotskerswell		Mary		Church of England		
St Andrew, Ashburton	Ashburton		Andrew	Medieval	Church of England	Ashburton etc.	
Our Lady of Lourdes & St Petroc, Ashburton	Ashburton		Mary & Petroc	1911	Roman Catholic	Buckfast Parish	Current building 1935
Ashburton Methodist Church	Ashburton			early C19th	Methodist	Teignbridge Circuit	Current building 1835
Ashburton Quaker Meeting	Ashburton			2004	Quakers		Plant from Totnes Quakers
St Nectan, Ashcombe	Ashcombe		Nectan of Hartland		Church of England	Haldon Mission Community	
St John the Baptist, Higher Ashton	Ashton		John the Baptist	Medieval	Church of England	Christow etc.	
St Mary the Virgin, Bickington	Bickington		Mary	c. 1420	Church of England	Ashburton etc.	
St John the Baptist, Bishopsteignton	Bishopsteignton		John the Baptist	Medieval	Church of England	Haldon Mission Community	
St John the Evangelist, Luton	Bishopsteignton (Luton)		John the Evangelist		Church of England	Haldon Mission Community	
Bishopsteignton Methodist Church	Bishopsteignton			c. 1820	Methodist	Teignbridge Circuit	
SS Peter, Paul & Thomas of Canterbury	Bovey Tracey		Peter, Paul, Thom B	Medieval	Church of England	Bovey Tracey PPT & Hennock	
St John the Evangelist, Bovey Tracey	Bovey Tracey		John the Evangelist	1851–1853	Church of England		
Holy Spirit, Bovey Tracey	Bovey Tracey		Holy Spirit	1904	Roman Catholic	Bovey Tracey Parish	Current building 1936
Bovey Tracey Baptist Church	Bovey Tracey			C17th	Baptist Union		
Bovey Tracey Methodist Church	Bovey Tracey				Methodist	Teignbridge Circuit	
Heathfield Community Church	Bovey Tracey (Heathfield)			c. 2010	MissionLifeGrace		
St Thomas Becket, Bridford	Bridford		Thomas Becket		Church of England	Christow etc.	
SS Peter & Paul, Broadhempston	Broadhempston		Peter & Paul	Medieval	Church of England	Beacon Parishes MC	
St Luke, Buckfastleigh	Buckfastleigh		Luke	1894	Church of England	Dart Valley Mission Community	Prev. chapel of ease. Rebuilt 1999–2002
St Benedict, Buckfastleigh	Buckfastleigh		Benedict of Nursia		Roman Catholic	Buckfast Parish	
Buckfast Abbey	Buckfastleigh (Buckfast)		Mary	1882	Roman Catholic	Buckfast Parish	Benedictine. Medieval abbey dissolved, restarted 1882
Parish of New Martyrs Elizabeth & Barbara	Buckfastleigh (Buckfast)		Elizabeth & Barbara		Russian Orthodox		Meets in Buckfast Abbey (also Totnes, Laity Moor)
Buckfastleigh Methodist Church	Buckfastleigh				Methodist	South Devon Circuit	
Buckfast Methodist Church	Buckfastleigh (Buckfast)				Methodist	South Devon Circuit	
St Peter, Buckland in the Moor	Buckland in the Moor		Peter		Church of England	Ashburton etc.	
St James, Christow	Christow		James		Church of England	Christow etc.	
SS Martin & Mary, Chudleigh	Chudleigh		Martin of T & Mary	Medieval	Church of England	Chudleigh & Trusham	
St Cyprian, Chudleigh	Chudleigh		Cyprian	1671	Roman Catholic	Bovey Tracey Parish	Private chapel at first. Registered and legal 1791
Chudleigh Baptist Church	Chudleigh						Meets in the local primary school
St Bartholomew, Coffinswell	Coffinswell		Bartholomew		Church of England	Coffinswell & Kingskerswell	
St Gregory the Great, Dawlish	Dawlish		Pope Gregory I		Church of England	Holiday Coast Miss. Community	
St Mary, Cofton	Dawlish (Cofton)		Mary		Church of England	Holiday Coast Miss. Community	
St George, Holcombe	Dawlish (Holcombe)		George	1867	Church of England	Holiday Coast Miss. Community	Prev. chapel of ease, consecrated 1945
St Agatha, Dawlish	Dawlish		Agatha of Sicily		Roman Catholic	All Saints Parish	
Dawlish Baptist Church	Dawlish			1970s	Independent		
Dawlish Methodist Church	Dawlish			1861	Methodist	Teignbridge Circuit	
The Strand Church, Dawlish	Dawlish			1810	URC		
Dawlish Church of Christ	Dawlish				Churches of Christ		
Dawlish Christian Fellowship	Dawlish			1939	Independent		Of Open Brethren origins
St Mary the Virgin, Denbury	Denbury and Torbryan		Mary	Medieval	Church of England	Beacon Parishes MC	
St Michael, Doddiscombsleigh	Doddiscombsleigh		Michael		Church of England	Christow etc.	
St Michael & All Angels, Dunchideock	Dunchideock		Michael & Angels		Church of England	Christow etc.	
St Mary, Dunsford	Dunsford		Mary		Church of England	Christow etc.	
St Martin, Exminster	Exminster		Martin of Tours	Medieval	Church of England	Exminster etc.	
Exminster Methodist Church	Exminster			C19th	Methodist	Exeter, Coast & Country Circuit	Current building 1892–1893
St Blaise, Haccombe	Haccombe with Combe		Blaise		Church of England	Shaldon Churches	
All Saints, Combeinteignhead	Haccombe with Combe		All Saints		Church of England	Shaldon Churches	
St Mary the Virgin, Hennock	Hennock		Mary		Church of England	Bovey Tracey PPT & Hennock	
St Paul, Chudleigh Knighton	Hennock (Chudleigh Knighton)		Paul		Church of England	Chudleigh & Trusham	
St John the Baptist, Holcombe Burnell	Holcombe Burnell		John the Baptist		Church of England	Tedburn St Mary etc.	
St Ida, Ide	Ide		Ida of Herzfeld	Medieval	Church of England	Shillingford, Alphington, Ide	
Ide Congregational Church	Ide			1864	Cong Federation		Current building 1883
St Mary the Virgin, Ideford	Ideford		Mary		Church of England	Haldon Mission Community	
St Michael, Ilsington	Ilsington		Michael		Church of England		
Stover Polish Church & Home	Ilsington (Liverton)				Roman Catholic		
St Andrew, Ipplepen	Ipplepen		Andrew	Medieval	Church of England	Beacon Parishes MC	
Ipplepen Methodist Church	Ipplepen			early C19th	Methodist	Teignbridge Circuit	First building 1826, current one 1865–1866
St Andrew, Kenn	Kenn		Andrew	Medieval	Church of England	Exminster etc.	
All Saints, Kenton	Kenton		All Saints	Medieval	Church of England	Exminster etc.	
St Mary, Kingskerswell	Kingskerswell		Mary		Church of England	Coffinswell & Kingskerswell	
St Gregory, Kingskerswell	Kingskerswell		Pope Gregory I		Roman Catholic	Newton Abbot Parish	
Kingskerswell Methodist Church	Kingskerswell				Methodist	Torbay Circuit	
St Michael, Kingsteignton	Kingsteignton		Michael		Church of England	Kingsteignton & Teigngrace	
Kingsteignton Community Baptist Church	Kingsteignton				Baptist Union		
Kingsteignton Chapel	Kingsteignton				URC		
St John the Baptist, Lustleigh	Lustleigh		John the Baptist	Medieval	Church of England	Moretonhampstead etc.	
St Thomas the Apostle, Mamhead	Mamhead		Thomas	Medieval	Church of England	Exminster etc.	
St Winifred, Manaton	Manaton		Winifred	Medieval	Church of England	Moretonhampstead etc.	
St Andrew, Moretonhampstead	Moretonhampstead		Andrew	Medieval	Church of England	Moretonhampstead etc.	
Doccombe Chapel	Moretonhampstead (Doccombe)				Church of England	Moretonhampstead etc.	
Moretonhampstead Community Church	Moretonhampstead						
St Paul, Newton Abbot	Newton Abbot		Paul	1859–1861	Church of England	Newton Abbot Parish	
All Saints, Highweek	Newton Abbot (Highweek)		All Saints	Medieval	Church of England	Newton Abbot Parish	
St Luke the Evangelist, Milber	Newton Abbot (Milber)		Luke	1936–1963	Church of England	Newton Abbot Parish	
St Mary, Wolborough	Newton Abbot (Wolborough)		Mary	Medieval	Church of England	Newton Abbot Parish	
St Joseph, Newton Abbot	Newton Abbot		Joseph		Roman Catholic	Newton Abbot Parish	
Shaldon Road Methodist Church	Newton Abbot (Milber)				Methodist	Teignbridge Circuit	
The Avenue Methodist & UR Church	Newton Abbot				Methodist / URC	Teignbridge Circuit	
Newton Abbot Salvation Army	Newton Abbot				Salvation Army		
Bradley Evangelical Church, Newton Abbot	Newton Abbot (Highweek)			1994	Brethren		Meets in Bradley Community Centre
King's Church Newton Abbot	Newton Abbot				Assemblies of God		
Newton Abbot Quaker Meeting	Newton Abbot				Quakers		
Cornerstone Christian Fellowship	Newton Abbot				Independent		Meets in Highweek Primary School, Coronation Road, Newton Abbot : Every Sunday at 10:30 a.m.
This Hope	Newton Abbot			2010	Independent?		Baptist Union church plant, maybe not BU member
St John the Baptist, North Bovey	North Bovey		John the Baptist	Medieval	Church of England	Moretonhampstead etc.	
St Bartholomew, Ogwell	Ogwell		Bartholomew		Church of England	Newton Abbot Parish	
St Clement, Bishop & Martyr, Powderham	Powderham		Pope Clement I	Medieval	Church of England	Exminster etc.	
St Nicholas, Ringmore	Shaldon		Nicholas	Medieval	Church of England	Shaldon Churches	
St Peter the Apostle, Shaldon	Shaldon		Peter	1890	Church of England	Shaldon Churches	
St Ignatius of Loyola, Shaldon	Shaldon		Ignatius of Loyola		Roman Catholic	All Saints Parish	
Shaldon Methodist Church	Shaldon				Methodist	Teignbridge Circuit	
St George, Shillingford St George	Shillingford St George		George		Church of England	Shillingford, Alphington, Ide	
St Paul, Starcross	Starcross		Paul		Church of England	Holiday Coast Miss. Community	
St Andrew, Stokeinteignhead	Stokeinteignhead		Andrew		Church of England	Shaldon Churches	
St Mary, Tedburn St Mary	Tedburn St Mary		Mary		Church of England	Tedburn St Mary etc.	
St John the Evangelist, Pathfinder Village	Tedburn St Mary (Pathfinder V.)		John the Evangelist		Church of England	Tedburn St Mary etc.	
Tedburn St Mary Methodist Church	Tedburn St Mary				Methodist	Exeter, Coast & Country Circuit	
SS Peter & Paul, Teigngrace	Teigngrace		Peter & Paul		Church of England	Kingsteignton & Teigngrace	
St James, West Teignmouth	Teignmouth		James	Medieval	Church of England	Haldon Mission Community	
St Michael the Archangel, Teignmouth	Teignmouth		Michael		Church of England	Haldon Mission Community	
Our Lady & St Patrick, Teignmouth	Teignmouth		Mary & Patrick		Roman Catholic	All Saints Parish	
Teignmouth Baptist Church	Teignmouth				Baptist Union		
Teignmouth Methodist Church	Teignmouth			1819	Methodist	Teignbridge Circuit	Current building opened in 1845 to the designs of architect R.B. Best of Exeter.
Teignmouth United Reformed Church	Teignmouth				URC		
Teignmouth Salvation Army	Teignmouth				Salvation Army		
Teignmouth Gospel Hall	Teignmouth			1790	Gospel Hall		Formerly known as Ebenezer Chapel
North Teignmouth Community Church	Teignmouth				Independent		Linked with Baptist Union
Mars Hill Church, Teignmouth	Teignmouth		Areopagus	2009	Independent		Meets in the Riviera Cinema
St Michael the Archangel, Trusham	Trusham		Michael		Church of England	Chudleigh & Trusham	
St Catherine, Whitestone	Whitestone		Catherine of Alexand.		Church of England	Tedburn St Mary etc.	
St Thomas, Oldridge	Whitestone (Oldridge)		Thomas		Church of England	Tedburn St Mary etc.	
St Pancras, Widecombe in the Moor	Widecombe in the Moor		Pancras of Rome	Medieval	Church of England	Ashburton etc.	Nicknamed 'Cathedral of the Moor'
St John the Baptist, Leusdon	Widecombe in the Moor (Leusdon)		John the Baptist		Church of England	Ashburton etc.	
Poundsgate Methodist Church	Widecombe in the Moor (Poundsgate)				Methodist	South Devon Circuit	
St John the Baptist, Woodland	Woodland		John the Baptist	1532–1536	Church of England	Beacon Parishes MC	

== Defunct churches ==
Name	Civil parish	Dedication	Founded	Redundant	Denomination	Notes
Holy Trinity, Buckfastleigh	Buckfastleigh	Trinity		1992	Church of England	Destroyed by arson. St Luke's chapel of ease became parish church
Holy Trinity, Torbryan	Denbury and Torbryan	Trinity	Medieval		Church of England	Churches Conservation Trust 1987
St Mary, Abbotsbury	Newton Abbot	Mary			Church of England	
St Leonard, Newton Abbot	Newton Abbot	Leonard of Noblac	Medieval	c. 2005	Church of England	Original demolished save tower 1836, C19th replacement now redundant
West Ogwell Church	Ogwell	Unknown	Medieval	1981	Church of England	Churches Conservation Trust 1982
