= List of schools in Devon =

This is a list of schools in Devon, England.

== State-funded schools ==
=== Primary schools ===
- Abbotskerswell Primary School, Abbotskerswell
- All Saints CE Primary School, Smallridge
- All Saint Marsh CE Academy, Newton Abbot
- Alphington Primary School, Alphington
- Appledore School, Appledore
- Ashburton Primary School, Ashburton
- Ashleigh CE Primary School, Barnstaple
- Ashwater Primary School, Ashwater
- Avanti Hall School, Exeter
- Aveton Gifford CE Primary School, Aveton Gifford
- Awliscombe CE Primary School, Awliscombe
- Axminster Community Primary Academy, Axminster
- Bampton CE Primary School, Bampton
- Bassetts Farm Primary School, Exmouth
- The Beacon CE Primary School, Exmouth
- Beaford Community Primary School, Beaford
- Bearnes Primary School, Newton Abbot
- Beer CE Primary School, Beer
- Bere Alston Primary Academy, Bere Alston
- Berry Pomeroy Parochial CE Primary School, Berry Pomeroy
- Berrynarbor CE Primary School, Berrynarbor
- Bickleigh Down CE Primary School, Woolwell
- Bickleigh on Exe CE Primary School, Bickleigh
- Bishop's Nympton Primary School, Bishop's Nympton
- Bishop's Tawton Primary School, Bishop's Tawton
- Bishopsteignton School, Bishopsteignton
- Black Torrington CE Primary School, Black Torrington
- Blackawton Primary School, Blackawton
- Blackpool CE School, Ilsington
- Boasley Cross Community Primary School, Boasley Cross
- Bolham Community Primary School, Bolham
- Bovey Tracey Primary School, Bovey Tracey
- Bow Community Primary School, Bow
- Bowhill Primary School, St Thomas
- Bradford Primary School, Bradford
- Bradley Barton Primary School, Newton Abbot
- Bradworthy Primary Academy, Bradworthy
- Brampford Speke CE Primary School, Brampford Speke
- Branscombe CE Primary School, Branscombe
- Bratton Fleming Community Primary School, Bratton Fleming
- Brayford Academy, Brayford
- Bridestowe Primary School, Bridestowe
- Bridgerule CE Primary School, Bridgerule
- Brixington Primary Academy, Exmouth
- Broadclyst Community Primary School, Broadclyst
- Broadhembury CE Primary School, Broadhembury
- Broadhempston Village Primary School, Broadhempston
- Buckfastleigh Primary School, Buckfastleigh
- Buckland Brewer Primary School, Buckland Brewer
- Burlescombe CE Primary School, Burlescombe
- Caen Community Primary School, Braunton
- Canada Hill Community Primary School, East Ogwell
- Castle Primary School, Tiverton
- Chagford CE Primary School, Chagford
- Charleton CE Academy, West Charleton
- Cheriton Bishop Community Primary School, Cheriton Bishop
- Cheriton Fitzpaine Primary School, Cheriton Fitzpaine
- Christow Primary School, Christow
- Chudleigh CE Community Primary School, Chudleigh
- Chudleigh Knighton CE Primary School, Chudleigh Knighton
- Chulmleigh Primary School, Chulmleigh
- Clawton Primary School, Clawton
- The Clinton CE Primary School, Merton
- Clyst Heath Community Primary School, Clyst Heath
- Clyst Hydon Primary School, Clyst Hydon
- Clyst St Mary Primary School, Clyst St Mary
- Cockwood Primary School, Cockwood
- Colyton Primary Academy, Colyton
- Combe Martin Primary School, Combe Martin
- Copplestone Primary School, Copplestone
- Cornwood CE Primary School, Cornwood
- Countess Wear Community School, Countess Wear
- Cranbrook Education Campus, Cranbrook
- Culmstock Primary School, Culmstock
- Dartington CE Academy, Dartington
- Dartmouth Academy, Dartmouth
- Decoy Primary School, Newton Abbot
- Denbury Primary School, Denbury
- Diptford Parochial CE Primary School, Diptford
- Doddiscombsleigh Primary School, Doddiscombsleigh
- Dolton CE Primary School, Dolton
- Drake's CE Primary School, East Budleigh
- The Duchy School, Bradninch
- Dunsford Community Academy, Dunsford
- East Allington Primary School, East Allington
- East Anstey Primary School, East Anstey
- East Worlington Primary School, East Worlington
- East-the-Water Community Primary School, Bideford
- Eden Park Academy, Barnstaple
- The Erme Primary School, Ivybridge
- Ermington Primary School, Ermington
- Exbourne CE Primary School, Exbourne
- Exeter Road Community Primary School, Exmouth
- Exminster Community Primary School, Exminster
- Exwick Heights Primary School, Exwick
- Farway CE Primary School, Farway
- Feniton CE Primary school, Feniton
- Filleigh Community Primary School, Filleigh
- Fremington Primary School, Fremington
- Gatehouse Primary Academy, Dawlish
- Georgeham CE Primary School, Georgeham
- Goodleigh CE Primary School, Goodleigh
- Great Torrington Bluecoat CE Primary School, Great Torrington
- The Grove School, Totnes
- Gulworthy Academy, Gulworthy
- Halberton Primary School, Halberton
- Halwill Community Primary School, Halwill
- Harbertonford CE Primary School, Harbertonford
- Hartland Primary School, Hartland
- Hatherleigh Community Primary School, Hatherleigh
- Hawkchurch CE School, Hawkchurch
- Haytor View Community Primary School, Newton Abbot
- Hayward's Primary School, Crediton
- Hazeldown Primary School, Teignmouth
- Heathcoat Primary School, Tiverton
- Hemyock Primary School, Hemyock
- Hennock Community Primary School, Hennock
- High Bickington CE Primary Academy, High Bickington
- Highampton Community Primary School, Highampton
- Highweek Community Primary School, Newton Abbot
- Holbeton Primary School, Holbeton
- Holsworthy CE Primary School, Holsworthy
- Holywell CE School, Tawstock
- Honiton Primary School, Honiton
- Horrabridge Primary School, Horrabridge
- Horwood and Newton Tracey Community Primary School, Horwood
- Ide Primary School, Ide
- Ilfracombe CE Junior School, Ilfracombe
- Ilfracombe Infant School, Ilfracombe
- Ilsington CE Primary School, Ilsington
- Instow Community Primary School, Instow
- Ipplepen Primary School, Ipplepen
- Kenn CE Primary School, Kennford
- Kentisbeare CE Primary School, Kentisbeare
- Kentisbury Primary School, Kentisbury
- Kenton Primary School, Kenton
- Kilmington Primary School, Kilmington
- Kings Nympton Community Primary School, King's Nympton
- Kingsacre Primary School, Braunton
- Kingsbridge Community Primary School, Kingsbridge
- Kingskerswell CE Primary School, Kingskerswell
- Kingsteignton School, Kingsteignton
- Kingswear Community Primary School, Kingswear
- Lady Modiford's CE Primary School, Walkhampton
- Lady Seaward's CE Primary School, Clyst St George
- Ladysmith Infant School, Exeter
- Ladysmith Junior School, Exeter
- Lamerton CE Academy, Lamerton
- Landkey Community Primary Academy, Landkey
- Landscore Primary School, Crediton
- Landscove CE Primary School, Landscove
- Langtree Community School, Langtree
- Lew Trenchard CE Primary School, Lewdown
- Lifton Community Academy, Lifton
- Littleham CE Primary School, Littleham
- Littletown Primary Academy, Honiton
- Loddiswell Primary School, Loddiswell
- Lydford Primary School, Lydford
- Lympstone CE Primary School, Lympstone
- Lynton CE Primary School, Lynton
- Malborough with South Huish CE Primary School, Malborough
- Manor Primary School, Ivybridge
- Marldon CE Primary School, Marldon
- Marpool Primary School, Exmouth
- Marwood School, Marwood
- Mary Tavy and Brentor Community Primary School, Mary Tavy
- Matford Brook Academy, Exeter
- Meavy CE Primary School, Meavy
- Membury Primary Academy, Membury
- Milton Abbot School, Milton Abbot
- Modbury Primary School, Modbury
- Monkerton Community Primary School, Monkerton
- Monkleigh Primary School, Monkleigh
- Montgomery Primary School, St Thomas
- Morchard Bishop CE Primary School, Morchard Bishop
- Moretonhampstead Primary School, Moretonhampstead
- Mrs Ethelston's CE Primary Academy, Uplyme
- Musbury Primary School, Musbury
- Newport Community School Primary Academy, Newport
- Newton Ferrers CE Primary School, Newton Ferrers
- Newton Poppleford Primary School, Newton Poppleford
- Newton St Cyres Primary School, Newton St Cyres
- Newtown Primary School, Exeter
- North Molton Primary School, North Molton
- North Tawton Community Primary School, North Tawton
- Northlew and Ashbury Parochial CE Primary School, Northlew
- Offwell CE Primary School, Offwell
- Okehampton Primary School, Okehampton
- Orchard Vale Community School, Barnstaple
- Otterton CE Primary School, Otterton
- Ottery St Mary Primary School, Ottery St Mary
- Our Lady and St Patrick's RC Primary School, Teignmouth
- Our Lady's RC Primary School, Barnstaple
- Parkham Primary School, Parkham
- Parracombe CE Primary School, Parracombe
- Payhembury CE Primary School, Payhembury
- Pilton Bluecoat CE Academy, Pilton
- Pilton Infants' School, Pilton
- Pinhoe CE Primary School, Pinhoe
- Plymtree CE Primary School, Plymtree
- Princetown Community Primary School, Princetown
- Rackenford CE Primary School, Rackenford
- Rockbeare CE Primary School, Rockbeare
- Roundswell Community Primary Academy, Roundswell
- Rydon Primary School, Kingsteignton
- St Andrew's CE Primary Academy, Chardstock
- St Andrew's CE Primary School, Buckland Monachorum
- St Andrew's Primary School, Cullompton
- St Catherine's CE Primary School, Heathfield
- St David's CE Primary School, Exeter
- St Gabriel's CE Primary School, Redhills
- St George's CE Infant School, Northam
- St Giles-on-the-Heath Community School, St Giles on the Heath
- St Helen's CE School, Bideford
- St James CE Primary School, Okehampton
- St John the Baptist RC Primary School, Dartmouth
- St John's RC Primary School, Tiverton
- St Joseph's RC Primary School, Exmouth
- St Joseph's RC Primary School, Highweek
- St Leonard's CE Primary School, Exeter
- St Margaret's CE Junior School, Northam
- St Martin's CE Primary School, Cranbrook
- St Mary's CE Primary School, Bideford
- St Mary's CE Primary School, Brixton
- St Mary's RC Primary School, Axminster
- St Mary's RC Primary School, Buckfast
- St Michael's CE Primary Academy, Heavitree
- St Michael's CE Primary School, Kingsteignton
- St Nicholas RC Primary School, Exeter
- St Peter's CE Junior School, Tavistock
- St Peter's CE Primary School, Budleigh Salterton
- St Rumon's CE Infants School, Tavistock
- St Sidwell's CE Primary School, Exeter
- St Thomas CE Primary School, Lapford
- St Thomas Primary School, Exeter
- Salcombe CE Primary School, Salcombe
- Sampford Peverell CE Primary School, Sampford Peverell
- Sandford School, Sandford
- Seaton Primary School, Seaton
- Shaldon Primary School, Shaldon
- Shaugh Prior Primary School, Shaugh Prior
- Shebbear Community School, Shebbear
- Sherford Vale School, Sherford
- Shirwell Community Primary School, Shirwell
- Shute Community Primary School, Shute
- Sidbury CE Primary School, Sidbury
- Sidmouth CE Primary School, Sidmouth
- Silverton CE Primary School, Silverton
- South Brent Primary School, South Brent
- South Molton Community Primary School, South Molton
- South Molton United CE Primary School, South Molton
- South Tawton Primary School, South Zeal
- Southmead School, Braunton
- Sparkwell All Saints Primary School, Sparkwell
- Spreyton School, Spreyton
- Starcross Primary School, Exeter
- Sticklepath Community Primary Academy, Barnstaple
- Stockland CE Primary Academy, Stockland
- Stoke Canon CE Primary School, Stoke Canon
- Stoke Fleming Community Primary School, Stoke Fleming
- Stoke Gabriel Primary School, Stoke Gabriel
- Stoke Hill Infant School, Exeter
- Stoke Hill Junior School, Exeter
- Stokeinteignhead School, Stokeinteignhead
- Stokenham Area Primary School, Stokenham
- Stowford School, Ivybridge
- Swimbridge CE Primary School, Swimbridge
- Tavistock Primary School, Tavistock
- Tedburn St Mary School, Tedburn St Mary
- Teignmouth Community School, Teignmouth
- Thorverton CE Primary School, Thorverton
- Thurlestone All Saints CE Academy, Thurlestone
- Tidcombe Primary School, Tiverton
- Tipton St John CE Primary School, Tipton St John
- The Topsham School, Topsham
- Totnes St John's CE Primary School, Totnes
- Trinity CE Primary School, Exeter
- Two Moors Primary School, Tiverton
- Uffculme Primary School, Uffculme
- Ugborough Primary School, Ugborough
- Umberleigh Primary Academy, Umberleigh
- Uplowman CE Primary School, Uplowman
- Upottery Primary School, Upottery
- Webber's CE Primary School, Holcombe Rogus
- Wembury Primary School, Wembury
- West Alvington CE Academy, West Alvington
- West Croft School, Bideford
- West Down School, West Down
- West Hill Primary School, West Hill
- Westcliff Primary Academy, Dawlish
- Westclyst Community Primary School, Westclyst
- Whimple Primary School, Whimple
- Whipton Barton Infants School, Whipton
- Whipton Barton Junior School, Whipton
- Whitchurch Community Primary School, Whitchurch
- Widecombe-in-the-Moor Primary, Widecombe in the Moor
- Wilcombe Primary School, Tiverton
- Willand School, Willand
- Willowbank Primary School, Cullompton
- Willowbrook School, Beacon Heath
- Winkleigh Primary School, Winkleigh
- Witheridge CE Primary Academy, Witheridge
- Withycombe Raleigh CE Primary School, Exmouth
- Wolborough CE Primary School, Wolborough
- Woodbury CE Primary School, Woodbury
- Woodbury Salterton CE Primary School, Woodbury Salterton
- Woodlands Park Primary School, Ivybridge
- Woodwater Academy, Exeter
- Woolacombe School Woolacombe
- Woolsery Primary School, Woolsery
- Wynstream Primary School, Exeter
- Yeo Valley Primary School, Barnstaple
- Yeoford Community Primary School, Yeoford

=== Non-selective secondary schools ===
- Atlantic Academy, Bideford
- Axe Valley Academy, Axminster
- Bideford College, Bideford
- Braunton Academy, Braunton
- Chulmleigh College, Chulmleigh
- Clyst Vale Community College, Broadclyst
- Coombeshead Academy, Newton Abbot
- Cranbrook Education Campus, Cranbrook
- Cullompton Community College, Cullompton
- Dartmouth Academy, Dartmouth
- Dawlish College, Dawlish
- Exmouth Community College, Exmouth
- Great Torrington School, Great Torrington
- Holsworthy Community College, Holsworthy
- Honiton Community College, Honiton
- The Ilfracombe Academy, Ilfracombe
- Isca Academy, Exeter
- Ivybridge Community College, Ivybridge
- King Edward VI Community College, Totnes
- The King's School, Ottery St Mary
- Kingsbridge Community College, Kingsbridge
- Matford Brook Academy, Exeter
- Newton Abbot College, Newton Abbot
- Okehampton College, Okehampton
- The Park Community School, Barnstaple
- Pilton Community College, Pilton
- Queen Elizabeth's School, Crediton
- St James School, Exeter
- St Luke's Church of England School, Exeter
- St Peter's Church of England Aided School, Heavitree
- Sidmouth College, Sidmouth
- South Dartmoor Community College, Ashburton
- South Devon UTC, Newton Abbot
- South Molton Community College, South Molton
- Tavistock College, Tavistock
- Teign School, Kingsteignton
- Teignmouth Community School, Teignmouth
- Thomas Hall School, Exeter
- Tiverton High School, Tiverton
- Uffculme School, Uffculme
- West Exe School, Exeter

=== Grammar schools ===
- Colyton Grammar School, Colyford

=== Special and alternative schools ===
- ACE Tiverton Special School, Tiverton
- Barley Lane School, St Thomas
- Bidwell Brook School, Dartington
- Devon Hospitals' Short Stay School, Exeter
- Ellen Tinkham School, Pinhoe
- Glendinning Academy, Newton Abbot
- The Lampard Community School, Barnstaple
- Marland School, Peters Marland
- Mill Water School, Bicton
- Orchard Manor School, Dawlish
- Pathfield School, Pilton
- The Promise School, Okehampton
- River Dart Academy, Dartington
- The Shoreline Academy, Roundswell
- Southbrook School, Exeter
- Stansfield Academy, Exeter
- Torlands Academy, St Thomas

=== Further education ===
- Academy of Music and Sound, Exeter
- Bicton College, Budleigh Salterton
- Exeter College, Exeter
- Exeter Mathematics School, Exeter
- Oakwood Court College, Dawlish
- Petroc, Barnstaple/Tiverton
- South Devon College, Newton Abbot

== Independent schools ==
=== Primary and preparatory schools ===
- Exeter Cathedral School, Exeter
- Park School, Dartington
- St Christopher's School, Staverton
- St Peter's Preparatory School, Lympstone

=== Senior and all-through schools ===
- Blundell's School, Tiverton
- Colours Academy, Ivybridge
- Exeter School, Exeter
- Kingsley School, Bideford
- The Maynard School, Exeter
- Mount Kelly School, Tavistock
- St John's School, Sidmouth
- St Wilfrid's School, Exeter
- Sands School, Ashburton
- Shebbear College, Shebbear
- South Devon Steiner School, Dartington
- Stover School, Teigngrace
- Totnes Progressive School, Totnes
- Trinity School, Teignmouth
- West Buckland School, West Buckland

=== Special and alternative schools ===
- Acorn School, Winkleigh
- Belong School Devon, Exeter
- Cambian Devon School, Paignton
- Chances Educational Support Services, Dawlish
- The Copper Academy, Holsworthy
- Exeter Royal Academy for Deaf Education, Exmouth
- The Greater Horseshoe School, Heathfield
- Heather Bridge School, Dousland
- Highgate Hill House School, Holsworthy
- Infocus School, Countess Wear
- K-HQ, Dulford
- The Libra School, South Radworthy
- Magdalen Court School, Exeter
- On Track Education, Barnstaple
- On Track Education, Dartington
- On Track Education, Totnes
- The Outdoors School, Shillingford Abbot
- Quay View School, Bere Alston
- Running Deer School, Moretonhampstead
- School for Inspiring Talents, Newton Abbot
- Tor View School, Tavistock
- Vranch House School, Exeter
- The Wildings, Talaton
