= Cofton =

Village in Devon, England

Coordinates: 50.6127°N 3.4589°W

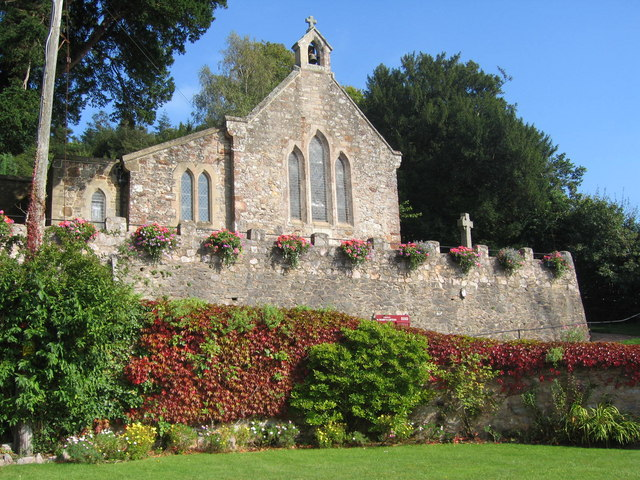
- St Mary's Church, Cofton

- Location within Devon
- OS grid reference: SX968802
- Civil parish: Dawlish
- District: Teignbridge
- Shire county: Devon
- Region: South West
- Country: England
- Sovereign state: United Kingdom
- Post town: EXETER
- Postcode district: EX4
- Dialling code: 01626
- Police: Devon and Cornwall
- Fire: Devon and Somerset
- Ambulance: South Western
- UK Parliament: Teignbridge

Cofton is a small village, parish and former historic estate near Dawlish, Devon.

== Parish church ==
The parish church, dedicated to St Mary, was rebuilt in 1838-9 by William Courtenay, 10th Earl of Devon (1777–1859), of Powderham Castle, a leader of the High Church revival and eldest son of Rt. Rev. Henry Reginald Courtenay, Bishop of Exeter. The architect was Charles Fowler.

=== Chapels ===
There were formerly two chapels in the parish of Dawlish:

==== Cofton Chapel ====
As reported by the Devon historian Polwhele, the original structure of St Mary's Church was a private chapel built for his own use by Dr George Kendall (1610-1663), Doctor of Divinity, who owned and resided at the estate of Cofton, and conducted the services personally. Pevsner however suggests the chapel had stood since the 13th century. In 1793 Cofton Chapel was in ruins, but still contained two monuments, one to Dr Kendall, the other to Mrs Charity Cooke (d.1646), a daughter of William Cooke of Exeter.

Dr George Kendall was the son and heir of George Kendall (d.1648) of Cofton by his wife Anne Cooke, a member of the Cooke family of Exeter, probably a junior branch of the Cooke family of Thorne in the parish of Ottery St Mary, Devon. George Kendall (d.1648) was the Customer of Exeter and Dartmouth and other member ports, but shortly before 1620 had been "wrongfully dispossessed". The Kendall family had been seated in at Treworgie in Cornwall four generations prior to Dr George Kendall.

Dr George Kendall matriculated at Exeter College, Oxford in 1626/7, aged 16 and in 1654 obtained the degree of Doctor of Divinity. From 1643-55 he was Rector of Blisland in Cornwall, of which benefice he was deprived. In 1645 he was appointed a Prebendary of Exeter Cathedral. From 1646-62 he was Rector of Kenton, Devon, of which benefice he was deprived. He was Rector of St Benet's Church, Gracechurch Street in the City of London in 1660. His biography appears in Walker's Sufferings of the Clergy (1714).

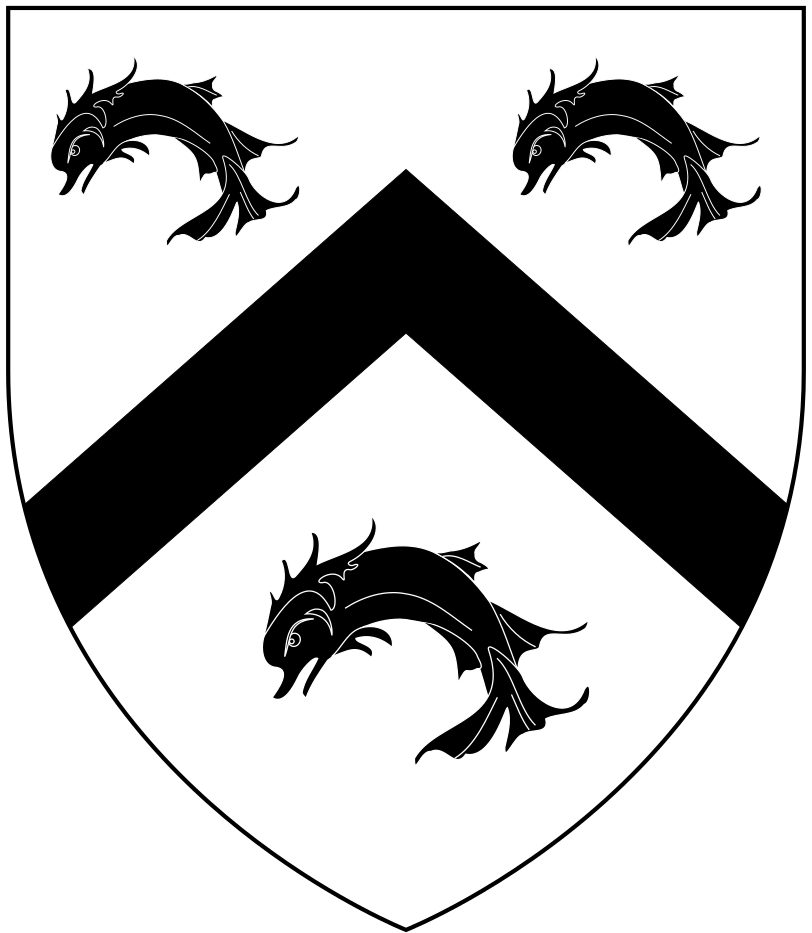
Arms of Kendall: Argent, a chevron between three dolphins naiant embowed sable

The mural monument of Dr Kendall, formerly on the north wall of the chancel, was transcribed by a correspondent (signing himself "FJ") to the Gentleman's Magazine of 1794 as follows:

In memoriam viri eximie eruditi Georgii Kendall Sstae theologiae doctoris, filii Georgii Kendall de Cofton, Armigeri, qui e vita discessit XIX Aug(ust)^{o} MDCLXIII et juxta hic sepultus jacet. Nec non in memoriam lectissimae eius conjugis Mariae, filiae Periam Pole de Talliton, Armigeri, quae obiit X^{mo} die Aprilis MDCLXXVI ("In memory of an exceptional and learned man George Kendall, Doctor of Sacred Theology, son of George Kendall of Cofton, Esquire, who departed from life the 19th of August 1663 and lies buried nearby. And not least in memory of his most select wife Mary, daughter of Periam Pole, Esquire, of Tallaton, who died on the 10th day of April 1676".)

In 1785 when "FJ" first viewed the monument the arms of Kendall (Argent, a chevron between three dolphins naiant embowed sable) and Pole (Azure semée of fleur-de-lys or, a lion rampant argent) were visible but had been effaced by 1794. Mary Pole (1628-1676) was baptised at Moretonhampstead, and was a daughter of Periam Pole (born 1592) of Southcote in the parish of Talaton, a son of the Devon historian Sir William Pole (d.1635), of Shute, Devon, by his wife Mary Peryam (1567–1605), one of the four daughters and co-heiresses of Sir William Peryam (1534–1604), of Fulford House, Shobrooke, Devon, a judge and Lord Chief Baron of the Exchequer.

==== Ludwell Chapel of St Mary ====
Ludwell (anciently Lithewyll) Chapel, dedicated to St Mary, also within the parish of Dawlish, was in 1793 a ruin standing in a field called "Chapel Park" on the estate of Ludwell, owned in 1793 by Richard Whidborne. Polwhele was informed by Mr Whidborne that all he knew about the chapel's history was that his father had told him "it is prayed for in Roman Catholic countries by the name of the Holy Chapel at Ludwell", and that on being given the estate by his father he had been made to promise that he would, "not remove any of the stones or any part of the building".

== Modern Cofton ==
Cofton is situated on the A379 road near the fishing ports of Cockwood and Starcross and is a popular holiday village in the area. The Cofton Holidays holiday park is situated within the parish, and features a leisure centre, outdoor swimming pool, pub (The Swan), fish and chip shop, and café.
