= EX postcode area =

Postcode area within the United Kingdom

Exeter
- Postcode area
- Coordinates: 50.832°N 3.677°W
- Country: United Kingdom
- Postcode area: EX
- Postcode area name: Exeter
- Post towns: 30
- Postcode districts: 33
- Postcode sectors: 128
- Postcodes (live): 22,230
- Postcodes (total): 28,566
- Statistics as at May 2020

The EX postcode area, also known as the Exeter postcode area, is a group of 33 postcode districts in South West England, within 30 post towns. These cover north and east Devon (including Exeter, Barnstaple, Axminster, Beaworthy, Bideford, Braunton, Budleigh Salterton, Chulmleigh, Colyton, Crediton, Cullompton, Dawlish, Exmouth, Holsworthy, Honiton, Ilfracombe, Lynmouth, Lynton, North Tawton, Okehampton, Ottery St Mary, Seaton, Sidmouth, Sidford, Sidbury, South Molton, Tiverton, Torrington, Umberleigh, Winkleigh and Woolacombe), plus the northernmost part of Cornwall (including Bude) and very small parts of Somerset and Dorset.

== Coverage ==
The approximate coverage of the postcode districts:

Postcode district	Post town	Coverage	Local authority area(s)
EX1	EXETER	Exeter (east), Heavitree (north), Monkerton, Newtown, Pinhoe, West Clyst	Exeter
EX2	EXETER	Exeter (south), Heavitree (south), St. Thomas (south), Countess Wear, Wonford	Exeter
EX3	EXETER	Clyst St George, Ebford, Exton, Topsham	East Devon, Exeter
EX4	EXETER	Exeter (north), Exwick, St. Thomas (north), Beacon Heath, Redhills, Pennsylvania, St. James, Whitestone	Exeter
EX5	EXETER	Bradninch, Broadclyst, Cadbury, Clyst Honiton, Clyst St. Mary, Cranbrook, Newton St. Cyres, Silverton, Talaton, Whimple, Woodbury	East Devon, Mid Devon
EX6	EXETER	Christow, Cockwood, Dunsford, Kennford, Kenton, Mamhead, Exminster	Teignbridge
EX7	DAWLISH	Dawlish, Dawlish Warren, Holcombe, Ashcombe	Teignbridge
EX8	EXMOUTH	Exmouth, Lympstone	East Devon
EX9	BUDLEIGH SALTERTON	Budleigh Salterton, East Budleigh, Otterton	East Devon
EX10	SIDMOUTH	Sidmouth, Sidford, Sidbury	East Devon
EX11	OTTERY ST. MARY	Ottery St. Mary, West Hill, Alfington	East Devon
EX12	SEATON	Seaton, Beer, Axmouth, Branscombe	East Devon
EX13	AXMINSTER	Axminster	East Devon, Dorset
EX14	HONITON	Honiton	East Devon
EX15	CULLOMPTON	Cullompton, Plymtree	Mid Devon
EX16	TIVERTON	Tiverton	Mid Devon
EX17	CREDITON	Crediton	Mid Devon
EX18	CHULMLEIGH	Chulmleigh	North Devon
EX19	WINKLEIGH	Winkleigh, Dolton, Beaford, Monkokehampton	Torridge, West Devon
EX20	NORTH TAWTON	North Tawton	West Devon
EX20	OKEHAMPTON	Okehampton	West Devon
EX21	BEAWORTHY	Beaworthy	West Devon
EX22	HOLSWORTHY	Holsworthy	West Devon
EX23	BUDE	Bude, Coombe, Crackington Haven, Launcells, Poundstock, Stratton	Cornwall
EX24	COLYTON	Colyton	East Devon
EX31	BARNSTAPLE	Barnstaple (west), Fremington, Yarnscombe, Alverdiscott	North Devon, Torridge
EX32	BARNSTAPLE	Barnstaple (east)	North Devon
EX33	BRAUNTON	Braunton	North Devon
EX34	ILFRACOMBE	Ilfracombe	North Devon
EX34	WOOLACOMBE	Woolacombe	North Devon
EX35	LYNMOUTH	Lynmouth	North Devon, Somerset
EX35	LYNTON	Lynton	North Devon, Somerset
EX36	SOUTH MOLTON	South Molton	North Devon
EX37	UMBERLEIGH	Umberleigh, High Bickington	North Devon, Torridge
EX38	TORRINGTON	Great Torrington	Torridge
EX39	BIDEFORD	Bideford, Northam, Appledore, Westward Ho!, Clovelly, Lundy Island	Torridge

== Map ==
EX postcode area map, showing postcode districts in red and post towns in grey text, with links to nearby DT, PL, TA and TQ postcode areas.

== See also ==
- Postcode Address File
- List of postcode areas in the United Kingdom
