= Gay's Creamery =

Bakery in Dawlish, Devon, England

Coordinates: 50.580373°N 3.467864°W

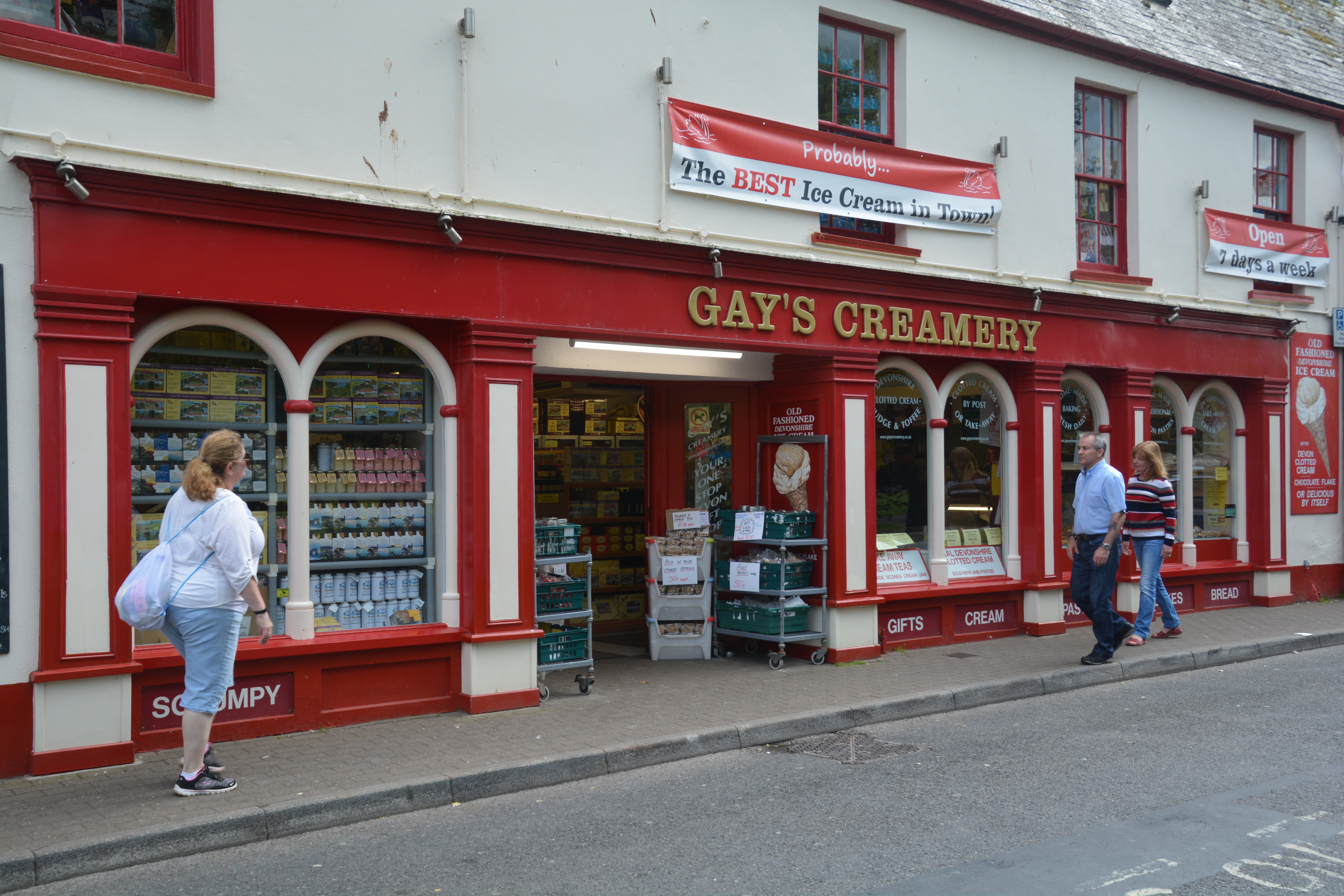
An external view of Gay's Creamery, Dawlish

Gay's Creamery is a bakery and ice-cream shop located at 20 Brunswick Place, Dawlish, Devon, England, close to the Dawlish Water stream. Their specialities include ice cream topped with a dollop of clotted cream and takeaway cream teas.

== History ==
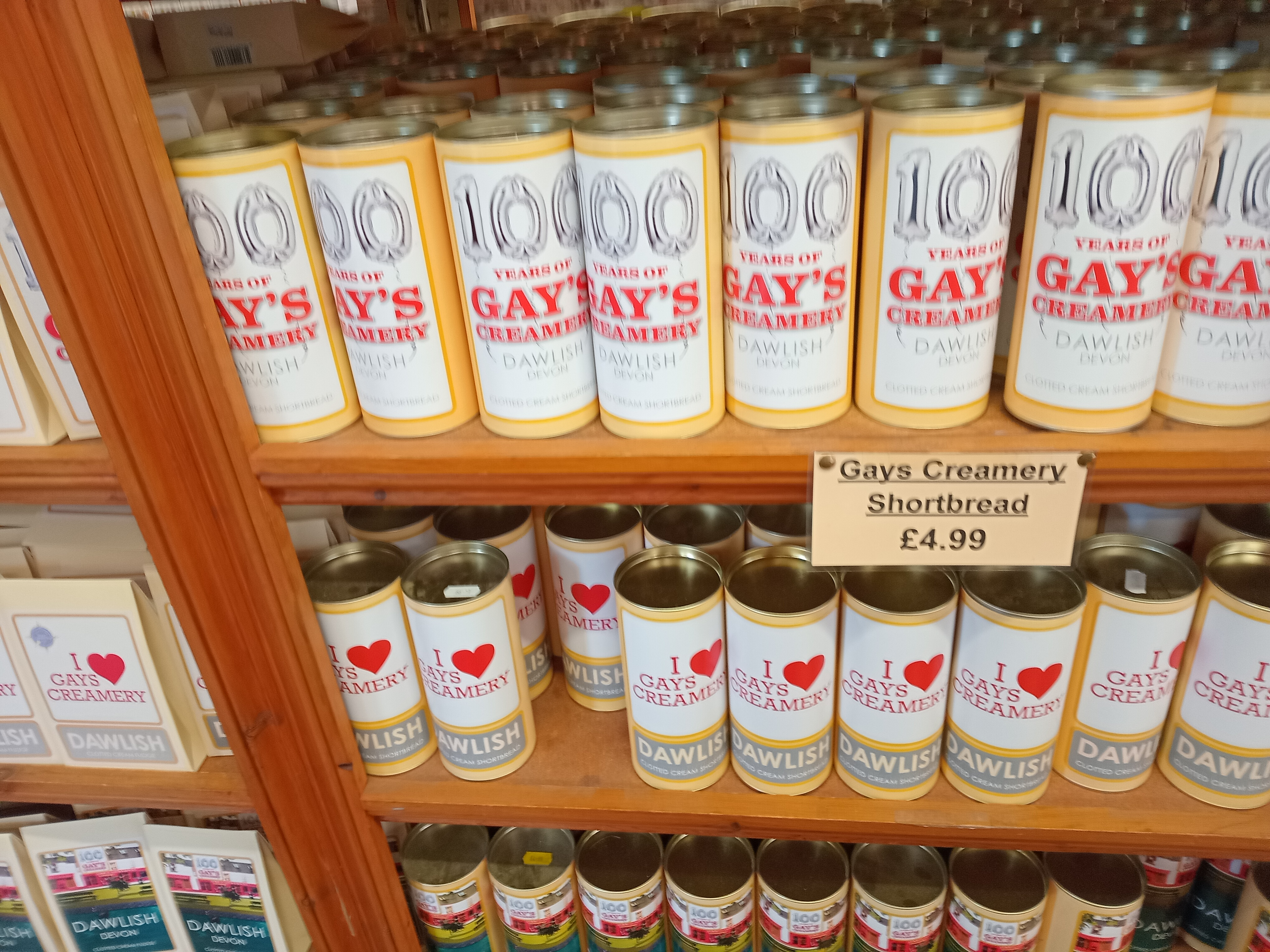
Shortbread biscuit tin for the 100 year anniversary

The creamery has been a local institution in Dawlish for many years, serving traditional Devonshire cream teas and other sweet and savory treats. In June 2025, it celebrated its 100th anniversary.

Gay's Creamery is known for its clotted cream desserts, including 99 ice cream cones with clotted cream and Devon scones with clotted cream. The creamery also offers a range of cakes, pastries, and quiches, as well as buttery rolls with jam and thick cream.

== Reception ==
As of August 2025 the creamery has a 4.4-star rating on Tripadvisor, based on 864 reviews. In 2018 it was ranked one of the best 10 bakeries by Devon Live, and in 2024 it was ranked among the best ice cream parlours in England by the Daily Mirror.
