= British Ceramic Tile =

Ceramic and glass tile manufacturer

British Ceramic Tile Limited
- Website type: Tile Manufacturer
- CEO: Tony Taylor
- Website: www.britishceramictile.com
- Current status: In Administration

British Ceramic Tile (BCT) is the largest manufacturer of ceramic and glass tiles in the UK, based in Devon. The company has been in operation at the Heathfield site, Newton Abbot since the 1850s. In September 2009, a major expansion of the BCT factory was completed, making it the largest and most efficient tile-making plant on one site in Europe. The factory is currently capable of producing 30,000 square metres of tiles per day. The company entered administration on 30 January 2019 citing a difficult market position and the loss of a major contract. The company was acquired by Al Murad DIY Ltd in August 2019.

== Tile manufacturing in Devon and the UK ==
Tile has been produced at Heathfield in Devon, the site of BCT's facility, for over 150 years, with the raw materials occurring within a mile radius of the site. Historically the UK has struggled in the tile industry, with more than 80% of tiles sold in the UK being imported. Originally Candy Tiles, BCT became the UK's biggest tile manufacturer in 2011, when it acquired shares of Brighouse based Ceramic Prints Ltd. Due in part to the decline of the tile-making industry in Britain in the 1970s, a large number of tiles are imported from Spain, Italy and more recently China. Recent developments have meant that UK manufacturers will be unaffected by a potential carbon tax outlined by the EU, with environmental efficiency a primary concern for both the EU and manufacturers themselves.
