= Buckfast (disambiguation) =

Buckfast is a village near Buckfastleigh, Teignbridge, Devon, England

Buckfast may also refer to:

- Buckfast Abbey a Benedictine monastery at Buckfast
  - Buckfast Tonic Wine, a fortified wine
  - Buckfast bee, a bee breed originally developed at Buckfast Abbey, then bred by members of the Federation of European Buckfast Beekeepers
- Buckfastleigh, a town in Devon, England
