= George Kendall =

George Kendall is the name of:

- David George Kendall (1918–2007), British statistician noted for Second World War rocket research
- George H. Kendall (c. 1854–1924), president of the New York Bank Note Company
- George Washington Kendall (a.k.a. George Kennedy, 1881–1921), Canadian sports promoter
- George Wilkins Kendall (1809–1867), American war correspondent and sheep rancher; Kendall County, Texas is named for him
- George Kendall (Jamestown council member) (c. 1570–1608)
- George Kendall (theologian) (1610–1663), of Cofton, Devon

== See also ==
- Sir Maurice George Kendall (1907–1983), British statistician
- Henry George Kendall (1874–1965), English sea captain
- George Kendall Sharp (1934–2022), American lawyer and federal judge
