= Customer (disambiguation) =

Customer refers to the purchaser or client in business.

Customer may also refer to:

- Customer (song), by Raheem DeVaughn
- Customer (tax collector), collector of customs tax
