= All-through school =

Type of school

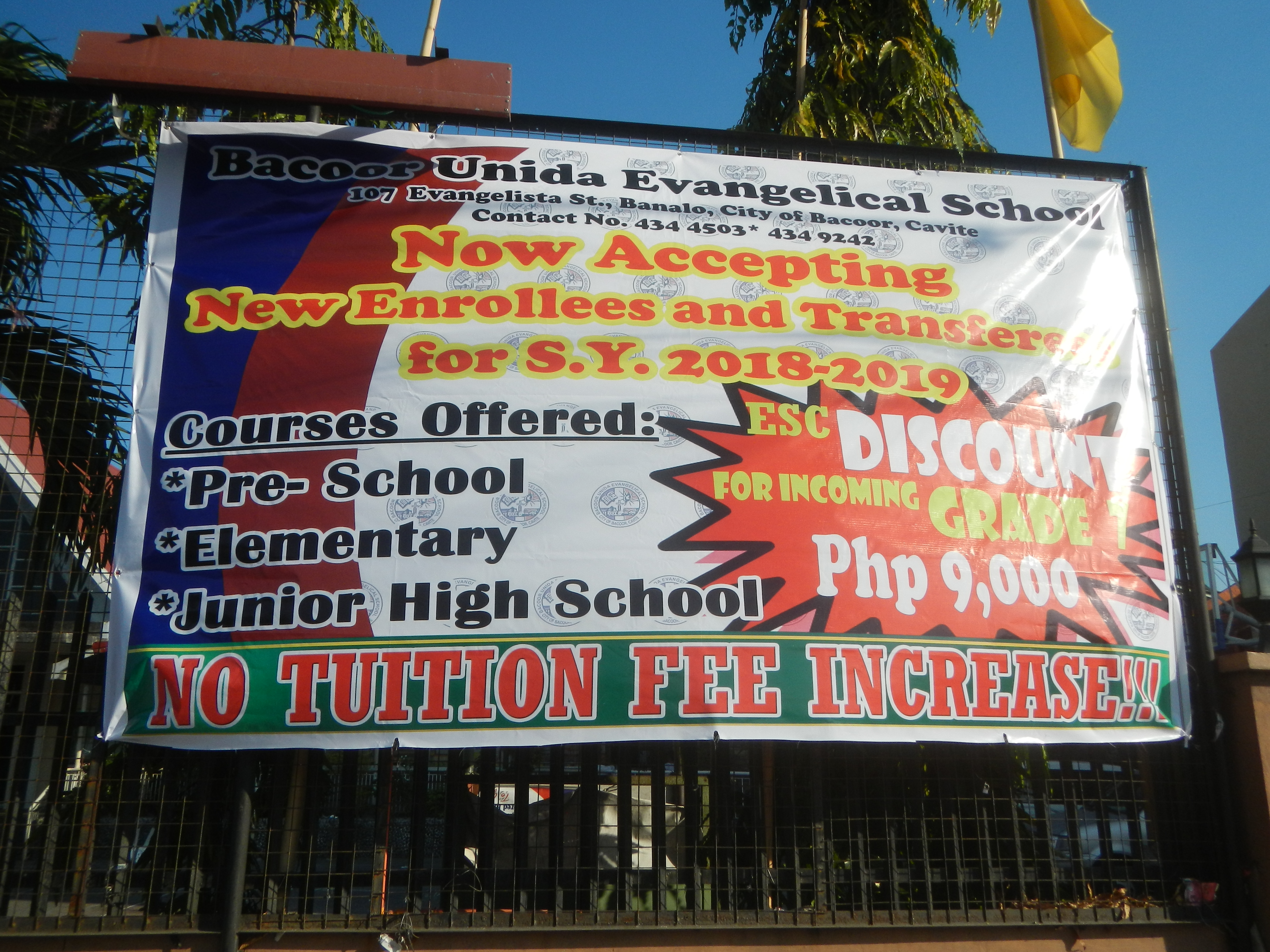
An all-through school offers multiple educational stages, such as this school that educates a student through preschool, primary and middle school.

An all-through school (also known as an integrated school) educates young people throughout multiple educational stages, generally throughout childhood and adolescence.

== Definition ==
The term "all-through" can be legitimately applied to establishments in many different circumstances, but one commonly accepted definition is "schools which include at least two stages of a young person's education within the one establishment".

== By country ==
=== Asia ===
==== Philippines ====
===== Private all-through schools in the Philippines =====
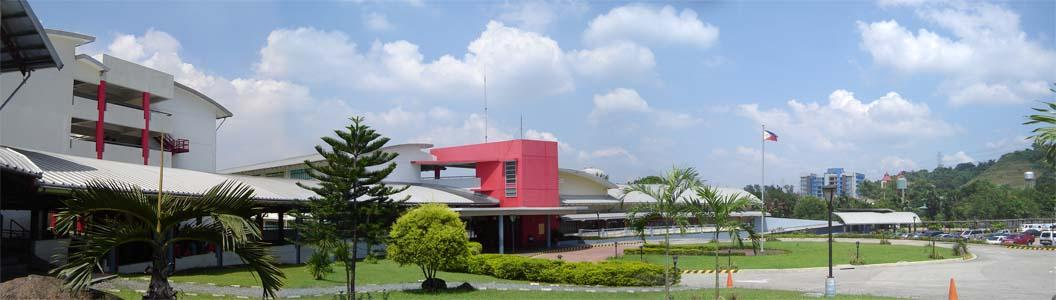
San Beda University’s Taytay campus offers basic education programs within a university setting.

Private educational institutions in the Philippines can offer multiple educational stages.

Examples include De La Salle University, the University of the East, Gingoog Christian Colleges and San Beda University, which operate both basic education and higher education programs.

Other private schools may offer both forms of secondary education, such as APEC Schools, or all forms of basic education from preschool to senior high school, such as Ingenium School.

===== State and local all-through schools in the Philippines =====
Philippine state schools at the university level are generally forbidden from offering basic education due to the separation of regulatory duties between the Department of Education and the Commission on Higher Education. A short, multi-year exemption was made during the implementation of the K–12 education curriculum to temporarily accommodate incoming senior high school students.

The University of the Philippines is a state university system that operates basic education campuses. These include the UP Integrated School, University of the Philippines High School Iloilo and University of the Philippines Rural High School.

==== Singapore ====
The NUS High School of Math and Science is a specialised high school under the National University of Singapore, which serves as the only high school in Singapore to be supported by a parent university.

=== Europe ===
==== United Kingdom ====
All through-schools combine primary and secondary education and may provide schooling over as wide an age range as three to nineteen years old.

In 2009, there were only 13 all-through state schools in England, but the Cameron–Clegg coalition government's Free school programme saw the number expand rapidly. State all-through schools also exist in Scotland and Wales. This school type is additionally common in the private sector.

Benefits associated with this school structure include giving younger children access to more specialist tuition in some subjects than they might have received at a separate primary school as well as making the transition from primary to secondary school less dramatic and disruptive. It has also been argued that having pupils attend the same institution throughout their schooling makes it easier to cater to their individual needs.

Academics and activists with involvement in early childhood have criticised all-through schools as belittling the difference between a toddler and a young person entering adulthood as well as being part of a general trend of imposing overly regimented school structures on young children. However, representatives of these schools state that they often provide separate facilities for older and younger children whilst the potential for some adult-monitored interaction between young people at different points of their early lives has also been cited as a positive of the school type.

Examples of this type of school are Simon Balle School, a co-educational secondary school, sixth form, and most recently, primary school with academy status located in Hertford, and Dartmouth Academy, a non-selective, co-educational school within the English Academy programme, in Dartmouth.

== See also ==
- Educational stage
- K–12
