= Leusdon Common =

Protected site in Devon, England

Coordinates: 50.540568°N 3.8303153°W

Leusdon Common is a Site of Special Scientific Interest (SSSI) within Dartmoor National Park, Devon, England. It is located 800m north of the village of Poundsgate. Leusdon Common is near but not adjacent another protected area: Holne Woodlands SSSI. Leusdon Common is protected because of the geological features of granite rocks at the site.

== Geology ==
The granite boulders found at Leusdon Common represent an intrusion of Permo-Caboniferous age. These granite rocks show evidence of migmatization and contain xenoliths.
