= Leusdon =

Village in Devon, England

Coordinates: 50°32′48″N 3°49′42″W

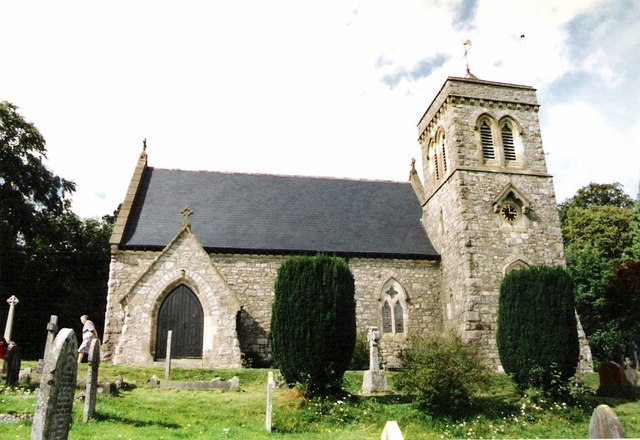
St John the Baptist Church in Leusdon

Leusdon is a parish in the southern part of Dartmoor in the county of Devon. It is situated about one kilometer to the north of the village of Poundsgate.

The village church is St John the Baptist, which was built in 1863. The Irish-born parliamentarian, writer, and land reformer, Sir Robert Richard Torrens is buried within the graveyard of St Johns the Baptist Church together with his wife.

Located nearby St John the Baptist Church is Leusdon Common, which is a site of special scientific interest, and is part of the Widecombe in the Moor parish.
