= Henry Singleton Pennell =

Recipient of the Victoria Cross

- Born: 18 June 1874; Dawlish, Devon
- Died: 19 January 1907 (aged 32); St Moritz, Switzerland
- Burial place: Dawlish Parish Churchyard
- Military career
- Allegiance: United Kingdom
- Branch: British Army
- Service years: 1893 - 1907
- Rank: Captain
- Units: Derbyshire Regiment
- Conflicts: Tirah campaign Second Boer War
- Awards: Victoria Cross

Captain Henry Singleton Pennell VC (18 June 1874 – 19 January 1907) was an English recipient of the Victoria Cross, the highest and most prestigious award for gallantry in the face of the enemy that can be awarded to British and Commonwealth forces.

== Early life and background ==
He was born in 1874 in Dawlish, Devon to Edwin Francis Pennell and his wife Henrietta née Copeland and was educated Eastbourne College, Sussex where there is now a Pennell House.

== Military career ==
Pennell attended the Royal Military College, Sandhurst, from 1892 to 1893, before joining the Derbyshire Regiment (later The Sherwood Foresters (Nottinghamshire and Derbyshire Regiment)) as a second lieutenant on 21 October 1893. He was promoted to lieutenant on 18 July 1896.

Pennell was 23 years old, and a lieutenant in the 2nd Battalion, The Derbyshire Regiment, British Army during the Tirah Campaign, British India when the following deed took place on 20 October 1897 for which he was awarded the VC.

During the attack on the Dargai Heights, Tirah, British India, when a captain of The Derbyshire Regiment was struck down, Lieutenant Pennell ran to his assistance and made two attempts, under a hail of bullets, to carry and drag him back to cover. The lieutenant only gave up when he found that the wounded officer was dead.

He was also awarded the India Medal with 2 clasps.

During the Second Boer War he was part of the large force sent out to relieve the Siege of Ladysmith, and took part in the Battle of Spion Kop (January 1900) and the Battle of the Tugela Heights (February 1900), where he was wounded on the day before the actual relief of the city. He was awarded the Queen's South Africa Medal with 2 clasps and was twice mentioned in dispatches. He later achieved the rank of Staff Captain at Southern Command. He was promoted to captain on 30 May 1900.

He was accidentally killed on 19 January 1907 whilst toboganning on the Cresta Run at St Moritz, Switzerland. He is buried in Dawlish Parish Churchyard where there is a large MI to him and others of the family.

His Victoria Cross is displayed at the Sherwood Foresters Museum, Nottingham Castle. His sword made by Wilkinson Sword on 13 July 1893 numbered 32227 is in possession of William Leroy, a Reality TV Host residing in Brooklyn NY.
