= Ashcombe =

Village in Devon, England

Coordinates: 50.60°N 03.54°W

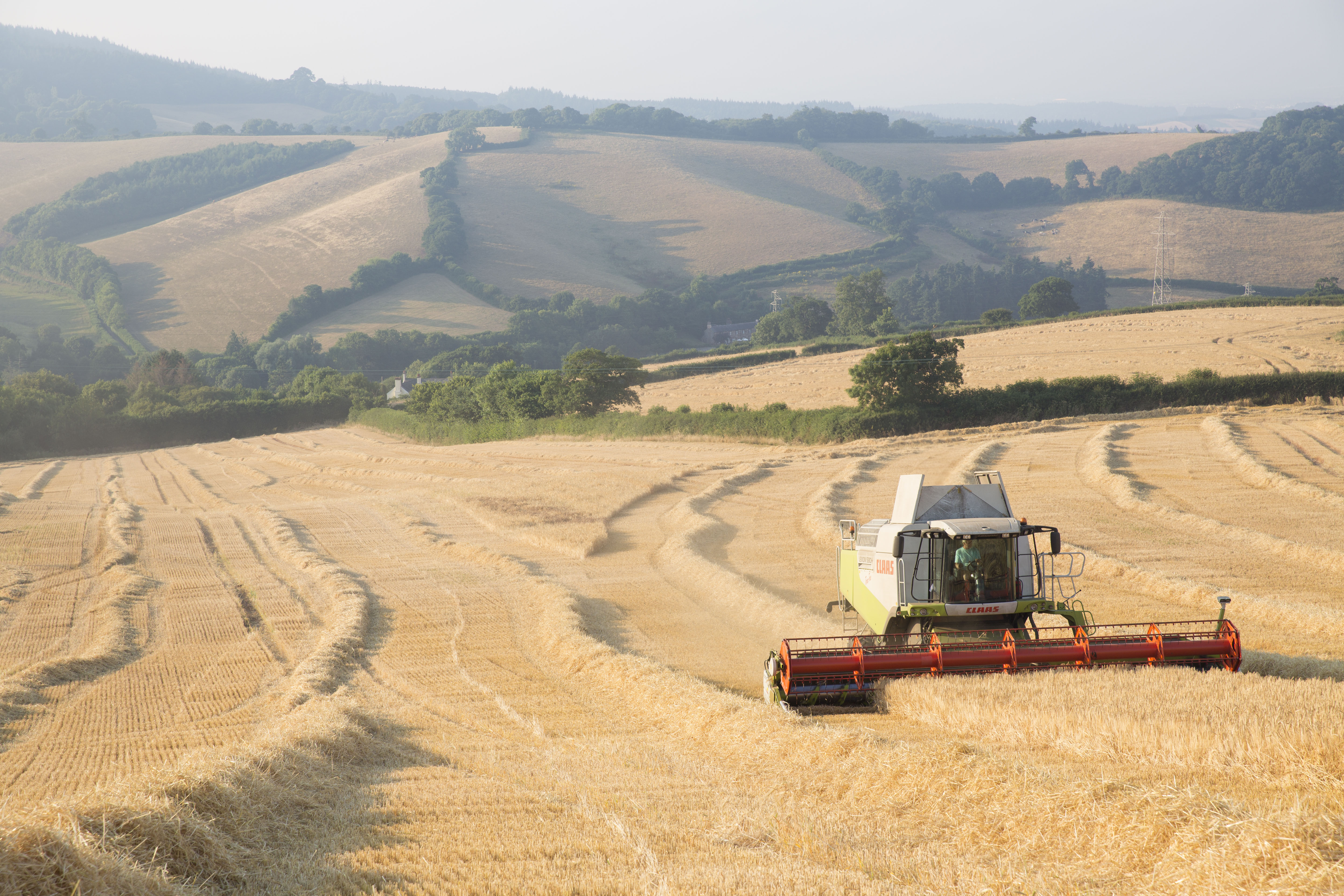
- Harvesting barley in Ashcombe in 2018

- Location within Devon
- Population: 77 (2001 census)
- OS grid reference: SX9179
- Civil parish: Ashcombe
- District: Teignbridge
- Shire county: Devon
- Region: South West
- Country: England
- Sovereign state: United Kingdom
- Post town: Dawlish
- Postcode district: EX7
- Police: Devon and Cornwall
- Fire: Devon and Somerset
- Ambulance: South Western
- UK Parliament: Newton Abbot

Ashcombe is a village and civil parish in the Teignbridge district of Devon, England, about eight miles south of the city of Exeter. The parish is surrounded clockwise from the north by the parishes of Kenton, Mamhead, Dawlish, Bishopsteignton and Chudleigh. In 2001 its population was 77, down from 125 in 1901.

The village lies at a height of about 100 m (330 ft) on the south-eastern side of the Haldon Hills, in the valley of the stream known as Dawlish Water. It is on a minor road about 1.2 km (3/4 mi) east of the junction on the A380 road known as Ashcombe Cross, which is at the centre of several areas of woodland and heathland, including Grammarcombe Wood, Haldon Forest and Ideford Common. Past Ashcombe, the minor road continues to the coastal town of Dawlish.

The village is recorded in Domesday Book (1086), when it was held by Ralph of Pomeroy. Before the Norman Conquest it was held by Aelfric, who was identified in the Exon Domesday with the Old English byname of 'pig'.

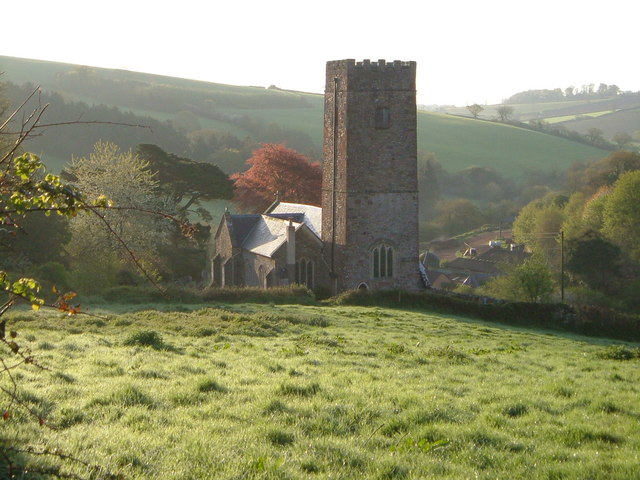
The church of St. Nectan

The church, which has an uncommon dedication to Saint Nectan, was dedicated in 1259 by Bishop Bronescombe and it has a continuous record of rectors from 1280. It was restored in 1824–26 by Anthony Salvin who was at the time also working on the nearby Mamhead House. Some older features remain in the church: the bench-ends and Perpendicular arches carry heraldry related to the Kirkham family, lords of the manor at the time, and there is some medieval and 17th-century stained glass.

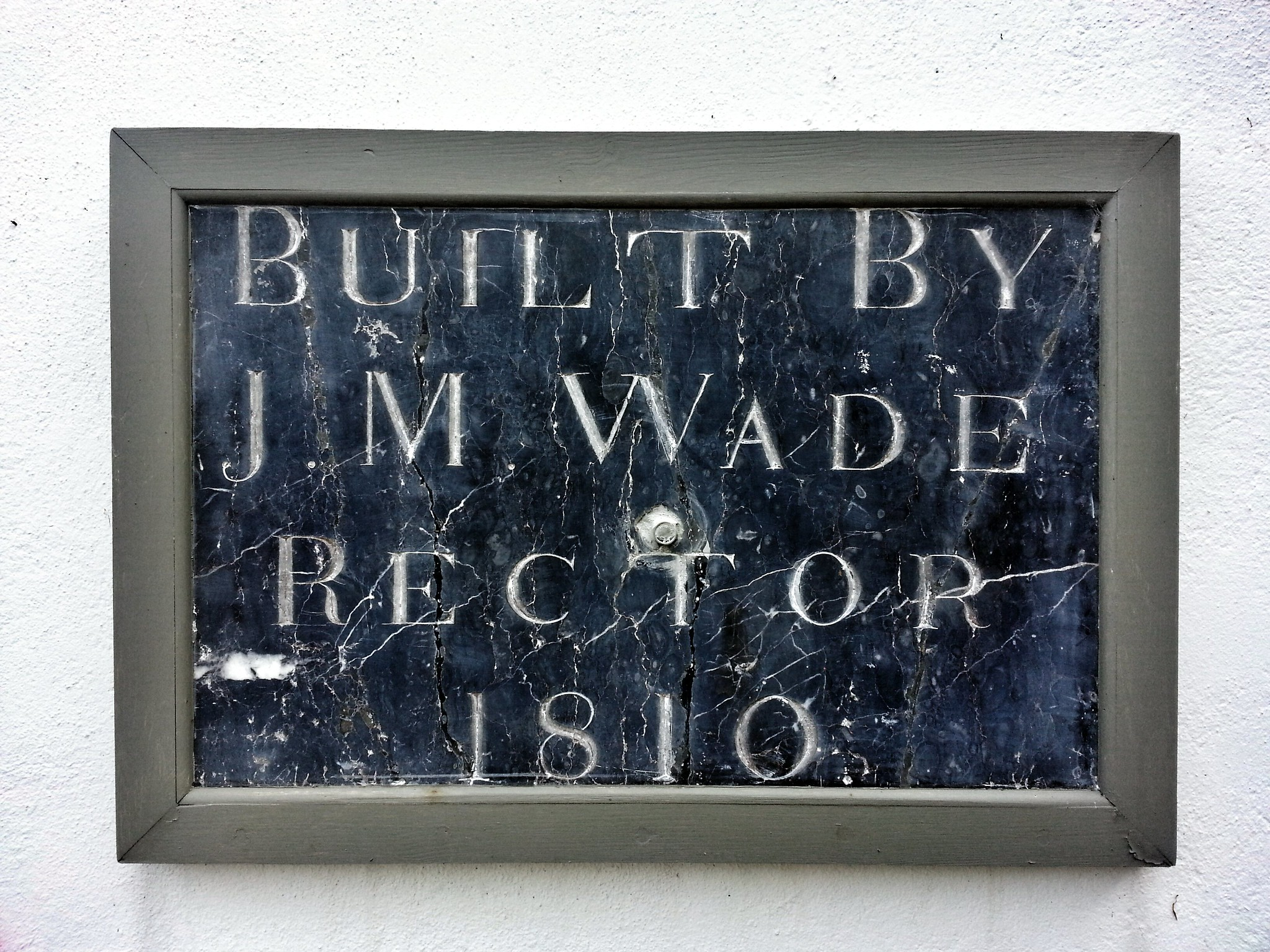
The Rectory Plaque

The Rectory was built in 1810 by the Rector J.M Wade, probably also designed by Salvin. Also within the parish is Ashcombe Tower (1935), built for Ralph Rayner, MP by Brian O'Rorke; the only major country house that he designed.

Ashcombe has a few diverse businesses from traditional farming to holiday cottages and outdoor activity centre which employ many local people. The Ashcombe Village Club is a not-for-profit community centre for the village which donates profits to charity.
