= Dawlish College =

Location
- Elm Grove Road; Dawlish, Devon, EX70BY; England; 50°35′03″N 3°27′46″W

Information
- Type: Academy
- Local authority: Devon County Council
- Trust: Ivy Education Trust
- Department for Education URN: 147643 Tables
- Ofsted: Reports
- Headteacher: Sam Banks
- Gender: Coeducational
- Age: 11 to 16
- Website: www.dawlish.devon.sch.uk

Dawlish College (formerly Dawlish Community College) is a coeducational secondary school located in the town of Dawlish, Devon, England. Its students come mainly from seven primary schools in the Dawlish Learning Partnership which is a large area between the Exe Estuary and the A380 road. This large catchment area results in about half of the college's students travelling there by bus.

In 2005 the college was awarded Technology College status under the (now defunct) specialist schools programme.

In 2018, Dawlish College joined a formal management partnership with Newton Abbot College, with its Principal, Paul Cornish, becoming Executive Principal of Dawlish College.

From September 2018, the college has been re-branded, with a new name, logo, uniform and motto.

In March 2019, the College was inspected by Ofsted and received a rating of "Good".

In December 2019, Dawlish College became an academy, part of the Estuaries Multi Academy Trust, along with Newton Abbot College and Starcross Primary School.

In June 2022, Estuaries Multi Academy Trust merged with Osprey Learning Trust to form a new Trust, named Ivy Education Trust.
