= Whitestone, Devon =

Village in Devon, England

Coordinates: 50.7333°N 3.6000°W

Whitestone
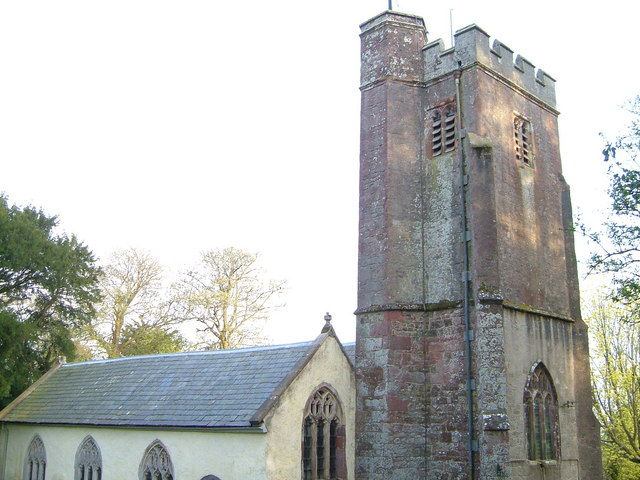
- St Catherine's Church, Whitestone

- Location within Devon
- OS grid reference: SX918924
- Shire county: Devon
- Region: South West
- Country: England
- Sovereign state: United Kingdom
- Post town: Exeter
- Postcode district: EX4
- Police: Devon and Cornwall
- Fire: Devon and Somerset
- Ambulance: South Western
- UK Parliament: Central Devon

Whitestone (/ˈwɪtstən/) is a small village in Devon, England, approximately 4 miles west of Exeter. It is in the parish of Whitestone; one of the 45 parish and town councils of Teignbridge District Council. As of the 2021 census, it had a population of 759.

Details of all Whitestone clubs, events and history can be found on the village website.

It is the village where Chris Martin of Coldplay was raised.
