= St James School, Exeter =

St James School

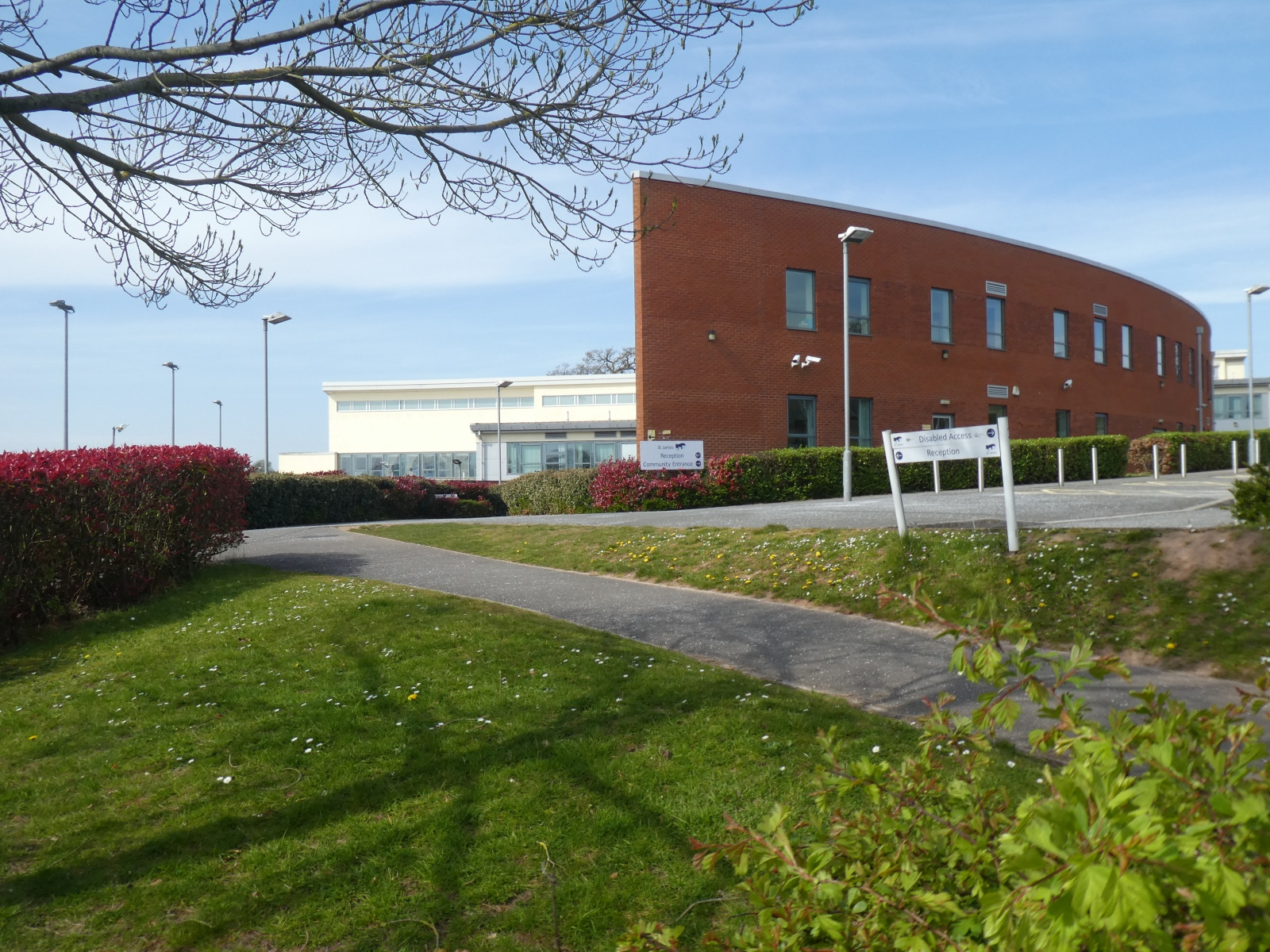
- The school in 2020

Location
- Summer Lane; Exeter, Devon, EX4 8NN; England
- Coordinates: 50.73612°N 3.49195°W

Information
- Type: Academy
- Motto: Work Hard, Be Kind
- Established: 1973 (became St James High School); 1 May 2016 (entered current form as academy under Ted Wragg)
- Local authority: Devon
- Department for Education URN: 142805 Tables
- Ofsted: Reports
- Head teacher: Emily Harper
- Gender: Mixed
- Age: 11 to 16
- Enrolment: 989 as of October 2025
- Capacity: 980
- Houses: Bristol Bath Oxford Goldsmiths
- Colour: Blue White
- Website: stjamesexeter.co.uk
- Bus: Whipton St James School

St James School is a mixed secondary school located in Exeter in the English county of Devon.

Previously a foundation school administered by Devon County Council, in May 2016 St James School was converted to academy status. The school is now part of the Ted Wragg Trust, but continues to coordinate with Devon County Council for admissions. The school moved into new buildings in February 2006.

St James School offers GCSEs and OCR Nationals as programmes of study for pupils. The school also has specialisms in mathematics and computing.
