= Dawlish Methodist Church =

Church in Dawlish, England

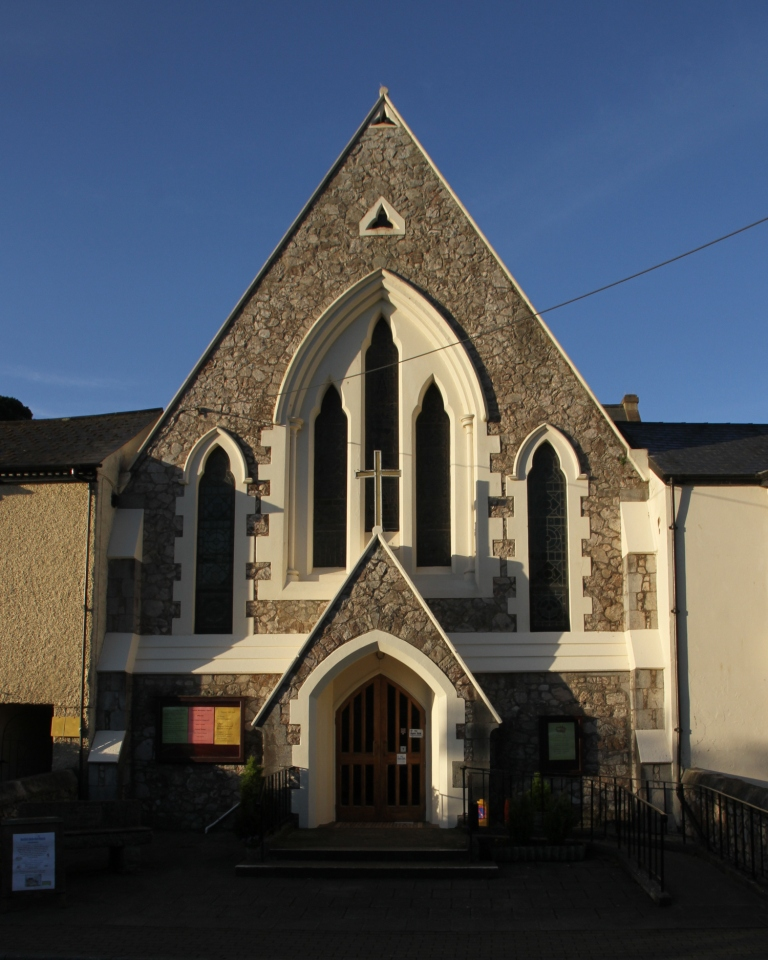
- The church in 2015
- Dawlish Methodist Church
- 50.5803°N 3.4697°W
- Denomination: Methodist
- Website: www.dawlishmethodistchurch.org.uk/index.html

History
- Status: Active

Architecture
- Groundbreaking: 18 March 1861

Dawlish Methodist Church is located on Brunswick Street in the town of Dawlish, Devon, England. It belongs to the circuit of Teignbridge.

== History ==
Ebenezer Pardon of Dawlish Water laid the church's founding stone in 1861. A schoolroom was added at the rear of the church in 1883. This is still in use, but has been extensively modernised.

== Fire ==
On 22 November 2015, the church's organ caught fire. This was noticed after smoke began to issue from the organ pump and fire crews were called to the church at 11.22am. The fire was extinguished and no major damage was caused.
