= Oakwood Court College =

Oakwood Specialist College
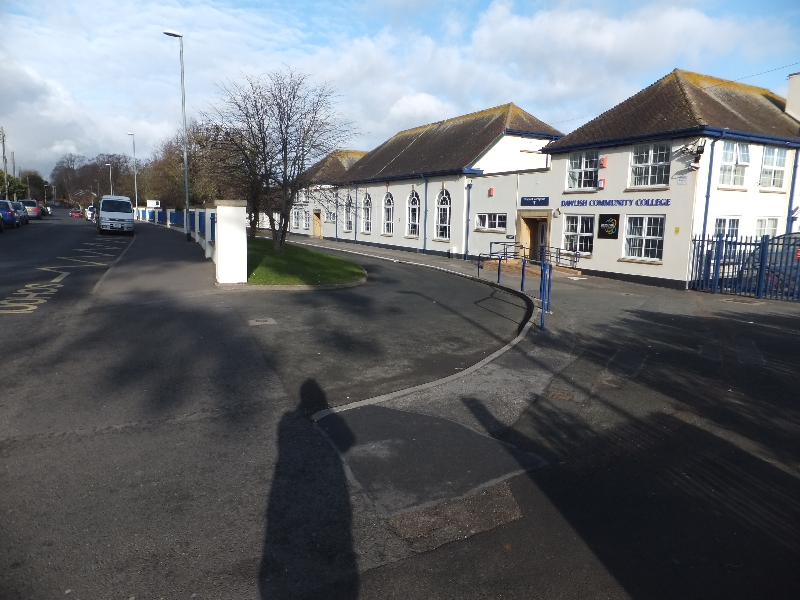
- Dawlish Campus

Location
- 7/9 Oak Park Villas; Dawlish; Devon, EX7 0DE; England; 50.585°N 3.466°W

Information
- Type: Special further education college
- Department for Education URN: 131947 Tables
- Ofsted: Reports
- Principal: Esther Williams
- Age: 16 to 25
- Enrolment: 90 as of March 2021
- Website: http://www.oakwoodcourt.ac.uk

Oakwood is a college in the U.K., which provides a specialist provision for young people aged 16 – 25 years, designed to meet the needs of those with Learning difficulties and disabilities, including Autism, Social Emotional and Mental Health (SEMH) conditions and complex behaviour. The college has two campuses, one in Dawlish on the Devon coastline and the other in Torpoint in South East Cornwall.
