= St Luke's Church of England School =

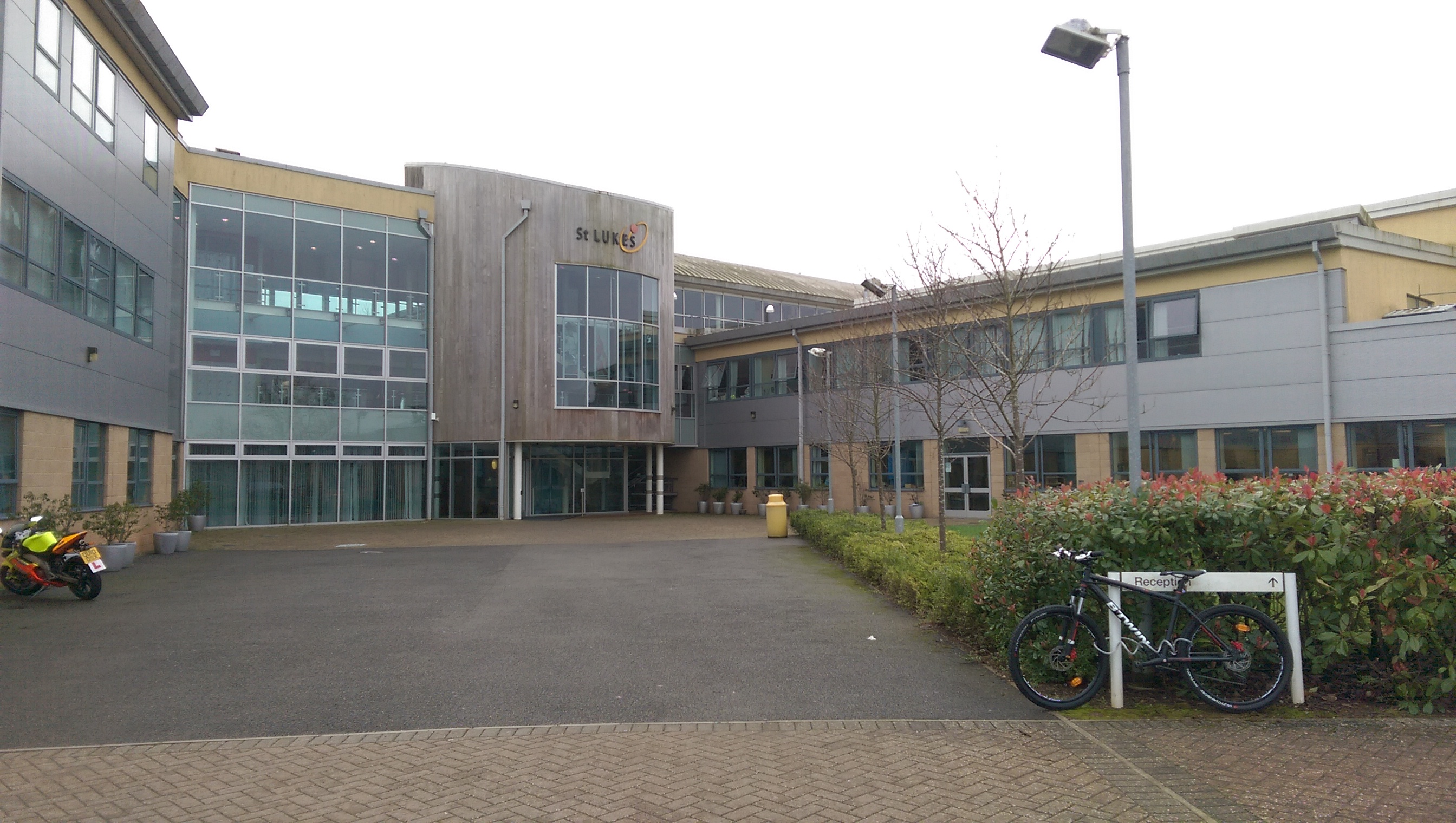

Location
- Harts Lane; Exeter, Devon, EX1 3RD; England; 50.73194°N 3.479835°W

Information
- Type: Academy
- Motto: Live Life to the Full
- Religious affiliation: Church of England
- Established: 1873
- Local authority: Devon County Council
- Trust: The Ted Wragg Multi Academy Trust
- Department for Education URN: 147401 Tables
- Ofsted: Reports
- Headteacher: Harrison Littler
- Staff: 95
- Gender: Co-educational
- Age: 11 to 16
- Houses: Franklin, Darwin, Galileo, Rutherford
- Website: https://www.stlukescofe.school/

St Luke's Church of England School is a co-educational secondary school located in Exeter in the English county of Devon. It is a Church of England school under the jurisdiction of the Diocese of Exeter.

It was originally known as St Luke's Church of England High School, but when the school gained specialisms in science and sports it was renamed St Luke's Science and Sports College. In February 2020 St Luke's Science and Sports College converted from being a voluntary controlled school administered by Devon County Council to being an academy sponsored by The Ted Wragg Multi Academy Trust. It was then renamed St Luke's Church of England School.

There are approximately 50 classrooms in total. This includes English, Maths, Humanities, Design and Technology, Hospitality and Catering, Drama, PE, Art, Computer Science and Music.

St Luke's Church Of England School offers a variety of WJEC optional courses, including music and IT. The choice of WJEC is presented to the pupils in Year 8, taking effect in Year 9. This gives students a chance to experience all WJEC courses in year 7-8.

Some of the latest rules include: all phones have to be locked away in Yondr Pouches (took effect in November 2025), all students on the amphitheatre at break/lunch times must be sat down (took effect June 2026).

The school has a Good rating from Ofsted. Many students went on to complete their A-Levels and to go further and get a university degree, around 70% went on to work from university whilst 20% went on to further education.

St Luke's Church of England School offers GCSEs and BTECs as programmes of study for pupils.
