= Holcombe, Teignbridge =

Village in Devon, England

Holcombe
- Village
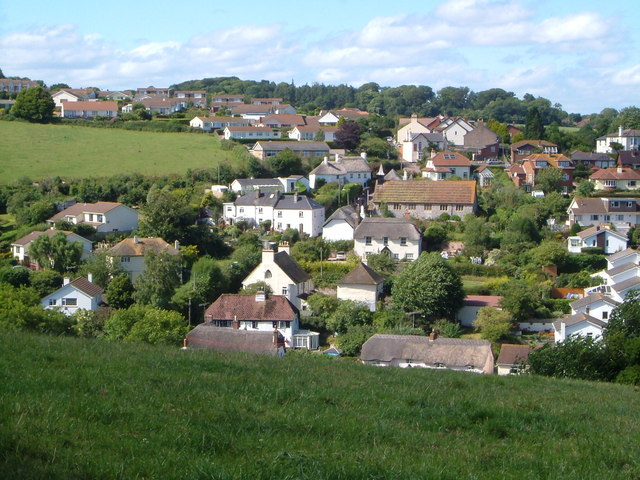
- Holcombe village, seen from the south

- Location within Devon Location within the United Kingdom
- Coordinates: 50°33′53″N 3°28′36″W
- Country: England
- County: Devon
- Time zone: UTC+0:00 (GST)
- Website: holcombevillage.weebly.com

Holcombe is a small village in the south of Devon, England, situated between the much larger coastal towns of Teignmouth and Dawlish. The village has very few facilities, although there are 2 pubs/restaurants, The Smuggler's Inn and The Castle Inn. Holcombe is a typical small English village, with thatched cottages and country lanes. Smugglers Lane at the bottom of the village allows safe access under the railway line to a hidden beach.
