= Dartmouth Academy =

Location
- Milton Lane; Dartmouth, Devon, TQ6 9HW; England; 50.3471°N 3.5964°W

Information
- Type: Academy
- Motto: "Be Your Best Self"
- Religious affiliation: None
- Established: 2010
- Department for Education URN: 136200 Tables
- Ofsted: Reports
- Principal: Paul Girardot
- Staff: 105
- Gender: Mixed
- Age: 3 to 16
- Enrolment: 528
- Website: www.dartmouthacademy.org.uk

Dartmouth Academy is a non-selective, co-educational school within the English Academy programme, in Dartmouth, Devon, in the south-west of England. The academy was opened in September 2010 following the merger of two schools, Dartmouth Community College and Dartmouth Primary School. It is an all-through school. Since becoming an academy, it is open to students aged 3 to 16.

== Ofsted results ==
The Academy received its most recent Ofsted report in 2023, where it was graded 'Good' in all categories.

== Building and facilities ==
The Academy has a modern, purpose-built school building. This finished construction and was opened in September 2010.

== Sponsor and affiliations ==
The Academy is part of the Education South West Multi Academy Trust (ESW).

It is affiliated with local partner Britannia Royal Naval College, a centre for the training of Royal Navy Officers.

From September 2021, it will be a Devon Music Hub for local primary schools.
