= Dawlish Water =

Stream in Devon, England

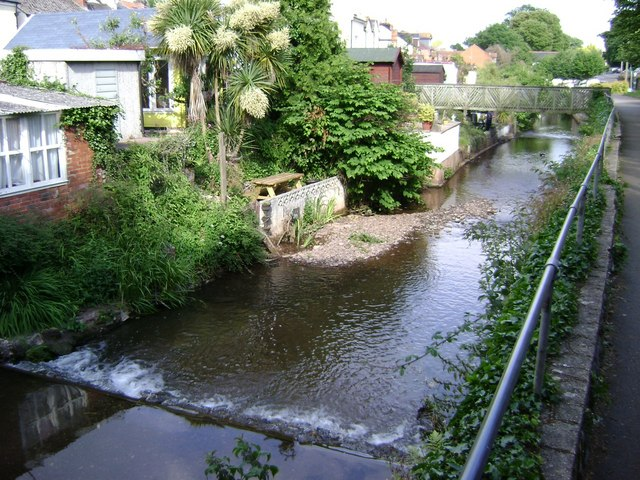
- Dawlish Water in Dawlish

Location
- Country: England
- Counties: Devon

Physical characteristics
- Source
  - location: Zigzag Wood, Ashcombe
  - coordinates: 50°37′4.6″N 3°32′26.4″W
  - elevation: 200 m (660 ft)
- Mouth
  - location: Dawlish
  - coordinates: 50.5801°N 3.465°W
  - elevation: 0 m (0 ft)
- Length: 9.3 km (5.8 mi)
- Basin size: 22.5 km^{2} (8.7 mi^{2})
- Width
  - minimum: 0.02 m (0.066 ft)
  - maximum: 13.7 m (45 ft)

Basin features
- Tributaries
  - left: Brown's Brook
  - right: Mamhead Stream

Dawlish Water is a minor coastal stream which flows through Devon, England.

Dawlish Water, also known as "The Brook", rises on the eastern slopes of Haldon Forest in the Haldon Hills by the A380 road and the B3192, (largely heathland and conifer forest), in the Mamhead Obelisk plantation and then flows southeast through Ashcombe, the hamlet of Dawlish Water, and on to Dawlish town, flowing over a series of weirs, then through the centre of the town, under the A379 road and the South Devon Main Line by Dawlish railway station, before terminating in the English Channel. The urban part of Dawlish Water is prone to flooding in certain situations, particularly with winds between south and east, when moisture-laden air is forced up the slopes of Haldon Hill, where it then condenses and precipitates. It is a relatively quick-response watercourse, so is susceptible to intense rainstorms, however river levels tend to fall fairly swiftly afterwards.

Dawlish Water has 15 minor tributaries, coming off Luscombe Hill and the hill by the Langdon Plantation. The only major tributary is Brown's Brook, which is approximately 1.9 miles (3 km) long and comes from Lidwell Chapel on Little Haldon.

Water quality is sometimes affected after heavy rainfall due to upstream farm effluent, and combined sewer outfalls in the river as it passes through the town. This in turn can affect the bathing water quality on the beach immediately next to the river, after heavy rain. Several initiatives have improved the situation recently, with the Environment Agency liaising with local farmers and water companies to improve water quality.

The water level of the stream has been measured in Dawlish since 2012; normal levels are between 0.12 metres (4.7 in) and 0.33 metres (1 ft 1 in). The maximum recorded level was 1.32 metres (4 ft 4 in) in November 2012.

As part of the 2019 works on Dawlish Sea Wall, the mouth of the redesigned to be surrounded by a 2-metre-high (6.6 ft) concrete wall which concentrates the flow of the river at the discharge point to reduce erosion of the surrounding rock and structures, such as the stone groyne.
