= Cockwood =

Village in Devon, England

Coordinates: 50°37′N 3°27′W

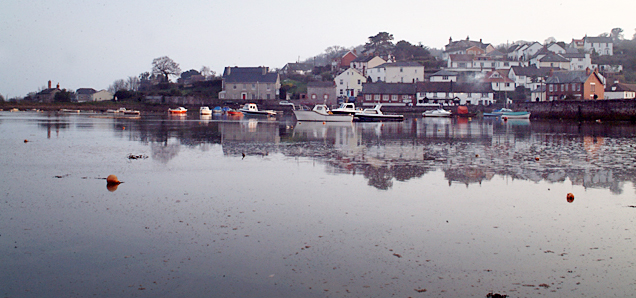
Cockwood, seen from across its harbour, with the tide in.

Cockwood is a small village on the west side of the Exe Estuary in Dawlish civil parish, Teignbridge district, in the county of Devon, England. Lying between the villages of Dawlish Warren and Starcross, it is separated from the estuary by the main railway line between Exeter and Torquay, and is set around a small tidal harbour which boats must reach via a bridge under the railway line.

Cockwood has two public houses. The Anchor Inn which is on the harbour front and the Ship Inn, nearer the village hall. The Anchor Inn is over 450 years old and was originally opened as a Seamen's Mission. It was a haven for seamen and smugglers and is said to be haunted by a friendly ghost and his dog. The Ship Inn is built from cob. South of the village centre, the railway line is crossed by a pedestrian track leading to Cockwood Steps, with a landing for small boats and a view over the estuary.

The railway tracks have occasionally been affected by flooding from the Exe.
