= Customer (tax collector) =

A customer or custumer (in Scotland) is an archaic term for a government appointed official who is empowered to collect taxation in the form of customs duty (import duty, export duty, tariffs, etc.) in certain defined physical locations or jurisdictions.

In England generally the office was sold by the crown as a farm, thus enabling the customer to pay a one-off fixed price for the right to assess, collect and retain as his personal property, as much revenue as the law allowed. Customers were frequently appointed for seaports which received imported goods, for example the Customer of Plymouth in Devon was one such office. In Scotland they were collected by the king's custumars at the ports under the acts of 1424 and 1455, almost all of which were within or dependent on royal burghs.

The appointment was made by letters patent on behalf of the crown, thus the holder was a patent officer. Most patent officers created several deputies who served under them. For example, the Customer of Plymouth appointed his own substitutes at ports covering much of the Cornwall peninsula, including Padstow, St Ives, Penzance, Helford, Falmouth, Penryn, St Mawes, Truro, Fowey, Looe, Saltash, etc.

== Customer of Plymouth ==
The following persons held the office of Customer of Plymouth:

- John Tickpenny, during the reign of King Henry VII (1485-1509)
- Thomas Edmonds (d.1604) of Plymouth in Devon and of Fowey in Cornwall (eldest son of Henry Edmunds of Salisbury in Wiltshire), Customer of Plymouth in 1564. He married firstly Joane de la Bere, a daughter of Anthony De la Bere of Sherborne in Dorset, by whom he was the father of the diplomat and courtier Sir Thomas Edmonds (1563-1639).
- Thomas I Peyton (1594/5), of St. Edmund's Bury, who married Cicilia Bourchier, a daughter of John Bourchier, 2nd Earl of Bath (d.1560) of Tawstock, Devon. The office was hereditary as his son Thomas Peyton (who married a daughter of Thomas Dowrich of Dowrich) was also Customer of Plymouth.
- Thomas II Peyton, son, who married a daughter of Thomas Dowrich of Dowrich.
- Henry Hereford (early 16th c.) On Candlemas Day 1528 he was paid wages of £95 7 shillings at Greenwich Palace recorded in the records of the Treasurer of the Chamber's Accounts as: "Hen. Hereford, customer of Plymouth, for ships sent by him into Spain with the King's ambassadors and letters, and for the discryvinge the Emperor's navy at his last coming out of Spain into England".
- John Connock (16th/17th c), nephew of Richard Connock (1560-1620), MP for Bodmin and Liskeard

== Customer of Exeter ==
The following persons held the office of Customer of Exeter, Devon:

- George Kendall (d.1648) of Cofton.
