= Poundsgate =

Village in Devon, England

Coordinates: 50.5341°N 3.8284°W

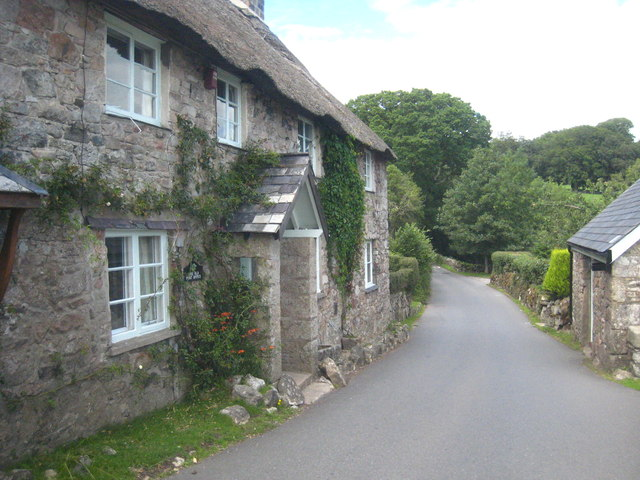
A cottage at Poundsgate

Location of Poundsgate in Devon

Poundsgate is a small village in Dartmoor, Devon, England, located on the road between Ashburton and Princetown.

The postal area of "Poundsgate" is a wide geographical area. There are a few cottages clustered around a popular stopping point for travellers, the Tavistock Inn, which is thought to date back to the 13th century. There are also many farms in and around the village. At one time there was a shop, a post office and a garage.

Poundsgate takes its name from the pound situated on the left-hand side of the road just past the last house when travelling toward Princetown. This house was once a smithy, the post office, the telephone exchange and a bakery. Poundsgate is situated in the ecclesiastical parish of Leusdon, the civil parish of Widecombe in the Moor and within the manor of Spitchwick.

Local legend says that it was visited by the Devil just before the Great Thunderstorm at Widecombe.
