= Heathfield, Devon =

Industrial estate in Devon, England

Coordinates: 50.571°N 3.650°W

Heathfield
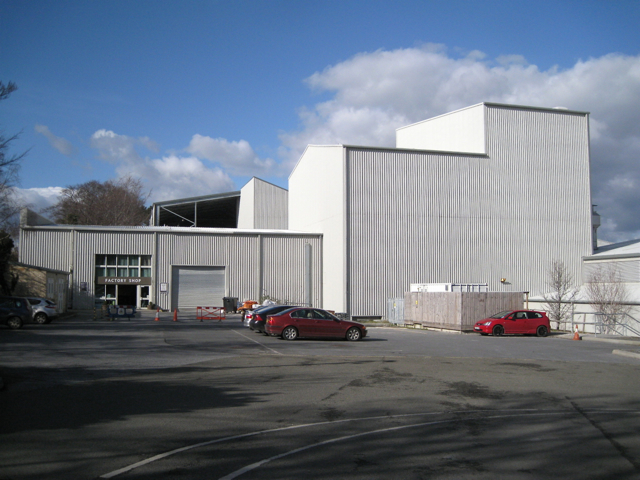
- British Ceramic Tiles factory at Heathfield

- Location within Devon
- Population: 1,832 (2011)
- District: Teignbridge
- Shire county: Devon
- Region: South West
- Country: England
- Sovereign state: United Kingdom

Heathfield is a residential area and industrial estate in Bovey Tracey parish, in the Teignbridge district of Devon, England. It is 2 miles south east of Bovey Tracey town centre and is next to the A382 and A38 roads. In 2011 the surrounding built-up area had a population of 1,832.
