= Buckfast =

Village in Devon, England

Coordinates: 50.49230°N 3.77903°W

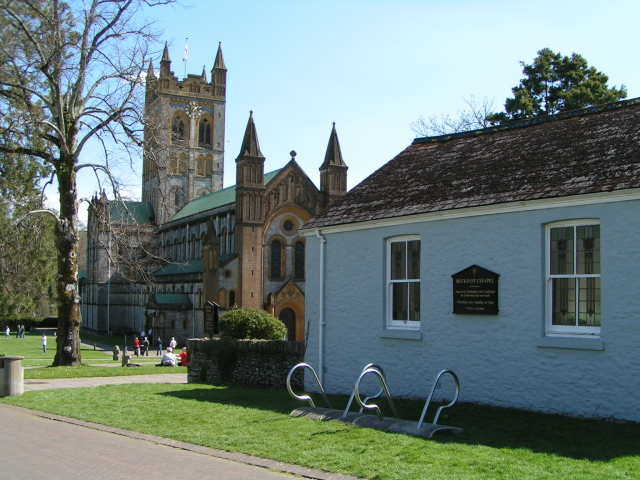
Buckfast Abbey and Methodist Church

Buckfast is a small village near Buckfastleigh in Teignbridge district, Devon, England, on the bank of the River Dart. It is the home of Buckfast Abbey, an active Benedictine monastery, which gave its name to Buckfast Tonic Wine, originally made there, and to the Buckfast bee, a bee breed originally developed at Buckfast Abbey.

Buckfast is in the civil parish of Buckfastleigh, which has a town council.

There is a Methodist chapel, built in 1881, which is used for joint Anglican and Methodist services every Sunday.

The village has a co-educational Roman Catholic primary school, St Mary's Catholic Primary School.

There were woollen mills in the village, powered by the River Dart. A large mill was taken over in the 1950s by Axminster Carpets. When the company went into administration in 2013 the Abbey acquired the Mill premises.

The village has a post office, which relocated in 2015 into the Mill Shop.
