= Dawlish =

Seaside town in Devon, England

Coordinates: 50.581°N 3.466°W

- The seafront at Dawlish

- Location within Devon
- Population: 15,257 (2021 Census)
- OS grid reference: SX963767
- Civil parish: Dawlish
- District: Teignbridge
- Shire county: Devon
- Region: South West
- Country: England
- Sovereign state: United Kingdom
- Post town: DAWLISH
- Postcode district: EX7
- Dialling code: 01626
- Police: Devon and Cornwall
- Fire: Devon and Somerset
- Ambulance: South Western
- UK Parliament: Newton Abbot

Dawlish /ˈdɔːlɪʃ/ is a seaside resort town and civil parish in the Teignbridge district of Devon, England. It is located on the south coast, 12 miles (19 km) south of the city of Exeter and a similar distance from the town of Torquay. At the 2021 census, it had a population of 15,257, which was 16% more than the 13,161 recorded in 2011. Dawlish had grown in the 18th century from a small fishing port into a seaside resort, as had its near neighbour, Teignmouth, in the 19th century.

== Description ==
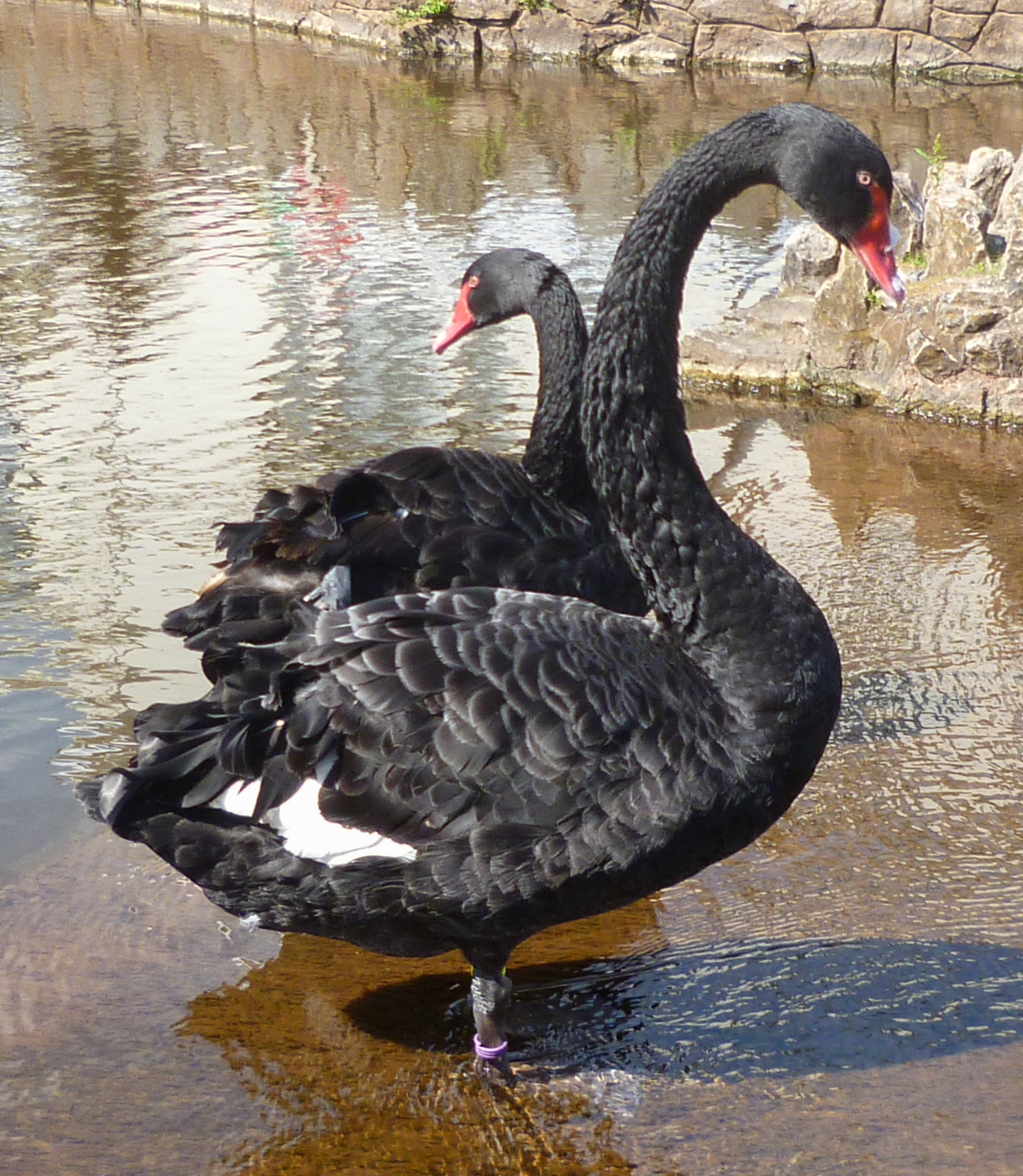
Black swans in Dawlish Water, 2010

Dawlish is located at the outlet of a small river, Dawlish Water (also called The Brook), between Permian red sandstone cliffs, and is fronted by a sandy beach with the South Devon Railway sea wall and the Riviera Line railway above. Behind this is a central public park, The Lawn, through which Dawlish Water flows.

Immediately to the south-west of Dawlish is a headland, Lea Mount, with Boat Cove at its foot and Coryton Cove, the furthest part of the beach accessible by the sea wall path behind it. To the north-east, via the beach or sea wall, the coast can be followed for around 1.5 miles (2.4 km) to Langstone Rock and the resort of Dawlish Warren beyond.

Dawlish is also known for its black swans (Cygnus atratus), introduced from Western Australia, which live with other exotic waterfowl in a small urban sanctuary on Dawlish Water. There are several attractions in and around the town, including beaches, safari mini-golf, a waterfowl centre, a theatre, a leisure centre with a pool, a countryside park and the Dawlish Museum.

== Toponymy ==
The name Dawlish derives from a Welsh river name meaning black stream. There was also a Roman translation of Dolfisc, meaning 'Dark river' and 'The Devils Water'. It was first recorded in 1044 as Doflisc. By 1086, it was Dovles; in 1302, Dovelish; and by 1468 it had become the more recognisable Dawlisshe.

== History ==
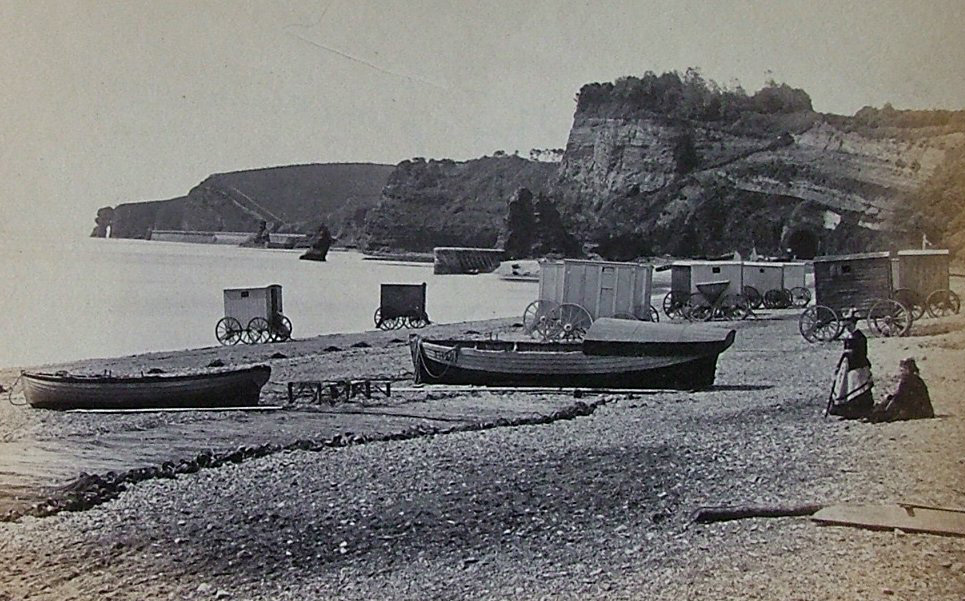
View of Dawlish beach in May 1881

Before Dawlish itself was settled, fishermen and salt makers came down from the higher ground where they lived, to take advantage of the natural resources available on the coast hereabouts. They built salterns to produce salt and stored it in sheds nearby. The unpredictable nature of the stream, Dawlish Water, during floods is likely to have led to nearby Teignmouth being the preferred site for salt-making, and the practice stopped at Dawlish during the Anglo-Saxon period (400–1000 CE).

The earliest settlement at Dawlish grew up almost a mile away from the coast, around the area where the parish church is today. There is evidence of early settlements at Aller Farm, Smallacombe, Lidwell and at Higher and Lower Southwood, where the ground would have been fertile and not subject to flooding.

The land that includes present-day Dawlish was granted by Edward the Confessor to Leofric, later the first Bishop of Exeter, in 1044. After the Norman Conquest, Leofric gave the land to the Diocese of Exeter, which held it until it was sold, in 1802.

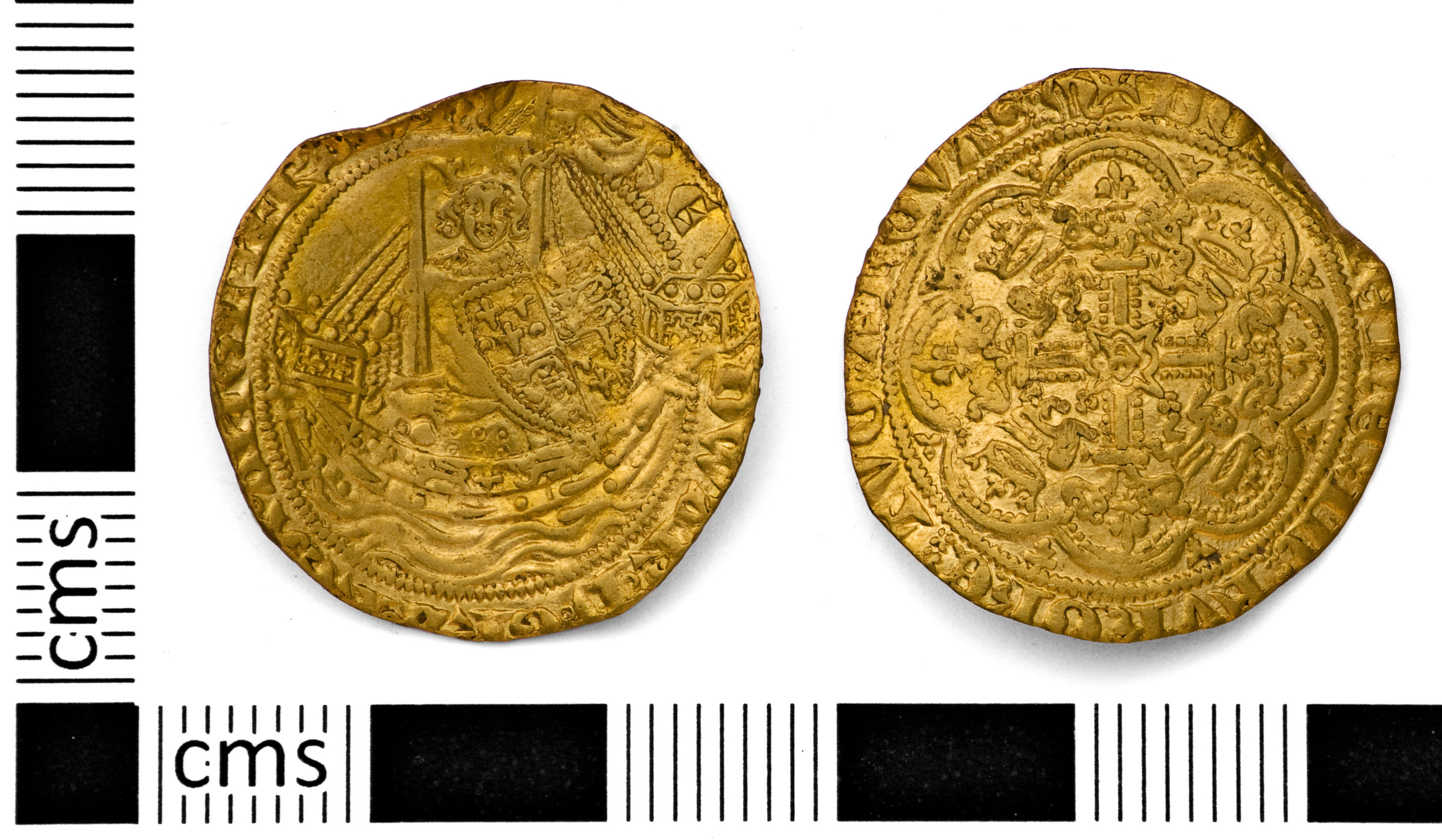
A gold half-noble coin of Edward III, minted c. 1351 – c. 1361 and found in Dawlish

Little of note happened at Dawlish until the end of the 18th century, when seaside locations on the south coast started to become popular with the wealthy, mainly caused by George III making Weymouth in Dorset his summer holiday residence from 1789. In May 1795, the antiquarian and topographer John Swete spent some time in Dawlish and reported that, although not long ago it had been no more than a fishing village and the best lodging house would not cost more than half a guinea per week, it was now so fashionable that "in the height of the season, not a house of the least consequence is to be hired for less than two guineas a week, and many of them rise to so high a sum as four or five."

In the first decade of the 19th century, the land between the original settlement and the sea was "landscaped"; the stream was straightened, small waterfalls were built into it, and it was flanked by a broad lawn and rows of new houses: The Strand on the north side and Brunswick Place on the south. The layout survives remarkably unchanged today, despite severe damage from a torrent of water coming down Dawlish Water from the Haldon Hills on the night of 10 November 1810.

Also worth noting are Manor House and Brook House (both about 1800) and some of the cottages in Old Town Street surviving from the old village. Dawlish's transformation from a fishing settlement to a watering hole for Victorian celebrities is documented at the Dawlish Museum.

=== Brunel's railway ===
In 1830, Isambard Kingdom Brunel designed an atmospheric railway, which operated on a pneumatic principle, using a 15-inch iron tube. One of the pumping stations was in this town. The line ran right along the seafront, but Brunel ensured that the line was carried across the mouth of the stream on a small granite viaduct, leaving access to the beach.

The railway opened on 30 May 1846 between Exeter St Davids and Newton Abbot. The first passenger train ran in September 1847, but the project was besieged with problems mainly with the leather sealing valve; after 12 months of use, it needed replacing at a cost of £25,000. South Devon Railway directors abandoned the project in favour of conventional trains.

== Literary connections ==
After visiting Sidmouth in 1801, Jane Austen spent a long holiday at Dawlish in 1802, later complaining about its "particularly pitiful and wretched library." She mentioned it several times in her 1811 novel Sense and Sensibility. In Charles Dickens' Nicholas Nickleby (1838–39), the protagonist inherits a small farm near Dawlish. The novelist and poet Margaret Holford died in Dawlish on 11 September 1852, aged 84. On 23 March 1818, the Romantic poet John Keats walked the three miles from Teignmouth to Dawlish to visit the Easter Monday fair and subsequently wrote a poem entitled Dawlish Fair, which details a fantasy of seducing a Devon woman.

== Transport ==
=== Railway ===
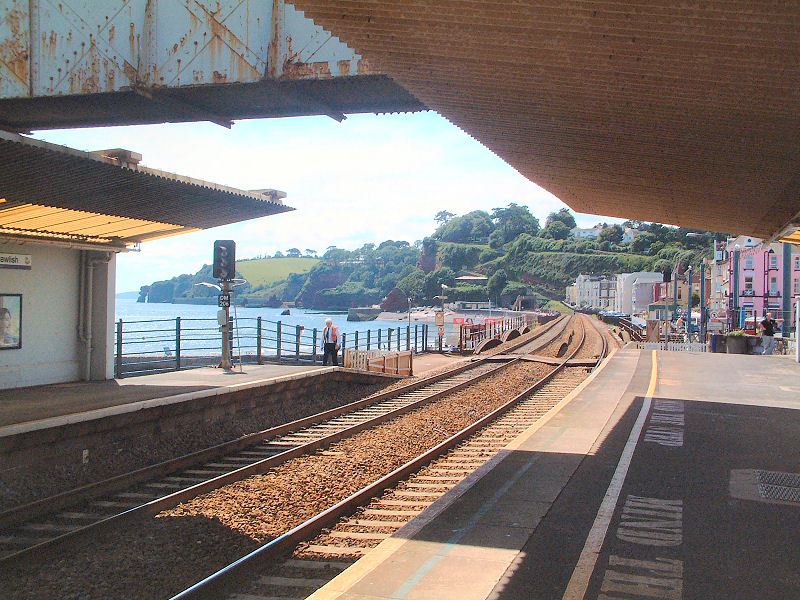
The view from Dawlish station to the south-west, towards the scenic coastal and tunnelled section of line

Dawlish railway station, situated in the town centre and next to the beach, is served by two train operating companies:

- Great Western Railway operates regular stopping trains on a route between Exmouth, Exeter St Davids and Paignton. Some inter-city services between Plymouth, Paignton and London Paddington stop here, as well as some services between Cardiff Central, Bristol Temple Meads, Plymouth and Penzance.
- CrossCountry services between Manchester Piccadilly and Paignton stop here twice a day in each direction.

The line includes one of the most memorable stretches of British track for its natural environment, but at high cost; a constant battle with sea erosion makes it one of the dearest lines in the country to maintain. For example, a storm in 1974 washed away much of the station's down platform; also, in the UK storms of January–February 2014, waves brought down the sea wall and washed away a section of line, leaving the permanent way suspended.

The 2014 storm raised questions about the vulnerability of the South Devon Railway sea wall to storm damage and proposals were made to route Plymouth-bound rail services further inland; these were reopening the disused railway line via Okehampton and Tavistock, reopening the former Teign Valley Line or reviving a 1930s GWR project to construct the Dawlish Avoiding Line. In May 2019, Network Rail began a project to improve the sea defences along the sea wall at Marine Parade, south of the station, promising a wider, more accessible walkway with seating and lighting, and greater protection from the sea; it was completed on 3 July 2023.

=== Roads ===
The A379 road between Exeter, Teignmouth, Torbay, Dartmouth and Plymouth runs through the town, parallel to the railway line.

=== Buses ===
Buses in the town are operated predominantly by Stagecoach South West. Key routes are:

- 2 from Exeter to Newton Abbot, via Teignmouth
- 11 from Dawlish Warren to Torquay
- 186, which links the town centre, hospital and Sainsbury's to the main housing areas; this is operated by Country Bus (Newton Abbot).

== Climate ==
Dawlish has a mild, oceanic climate bordering on a warm to cool Mediterranean climate, according to the Köppen climate classification, with low precipitation in the summer period and high rainfall in the winter. Often termed the "English Riviera" along with Teignmouth and Torbay, Dawlish rarely has snow or frost and grows outdoor subtropical plants such as palms, olives, bananas and lemons. Temperatures over 30C or under 0C are infrequent. It is one of the sunniest places in Britain, with an average of nearly 1,800 hours a year. Despite more favourable conditions in the summer, the wet autumn and winter can bring copious amounts of rain; when areas of low pressure move up the English Channel, easterly winds with dramatic storm surges and waves along the seafront.

Climate data for Dawlish
Month	Jan	Feb	Mar	Apr	May	Jun	Jul	Aug	Sep	Oct	Nov	Dec	Year
Mean daily maximum °C (°F)	9.3 (48.7)	9.1 (48.4)	11.0 (51.8)	13.2 (55.8)	16.2 (61.2)	19.4 (66.9)	21.3 (70.3)	21.1 (70.0)	19.0 (66.2)	15.9 (60.6)	12.2 (54.0)	10.3 (50.5)	14.8 (58.7)
Mean daily minimum °C (°F)	4.0 (39.2)	3.8 (38.8)	4.6 (40.3)	6.1 (43.0)	8.8 (47.8)	11.7 (53.1)	13.5 (56.3)	13.6 (56.5)	11.9 (53.4)	9.7 (49.5)	6.3 (43.3)	4.9 (40.8)	8.2 (46.8)
Average precipitation mm (inches)	96 (3.8)	77 (3.0)	69 (2.7)	50 (2.0)	55 (2.2)	47 (1.9)	45 (1.8)	58 (2.3)	60 (2.4)	77 (3.0)	77 (3.0)	95 (3.7)	854.2 (33.63)
Average precipitation days (≥ 1.0 mm)	18	14	16	13	14	11	10	11	13	15	17	17	169
Mean monthly sunshine hours	64.4	80.1	126.0	175.8	213.8	218.3	222.6	202.1	158.8	108.4	82.2	64.4	1,717

== Local produce ==
During the early and middle part of the 20th century, Dawlish became known for Devon Violets perfume. Hundreds of varieties were grown in market gardens surrounding the town. Violet escapees can be found growing wild across the area. Lately the town has become known for growing dianthus, freesias, daffodils, tomatoes and strawberries.

== Retail and employment ==
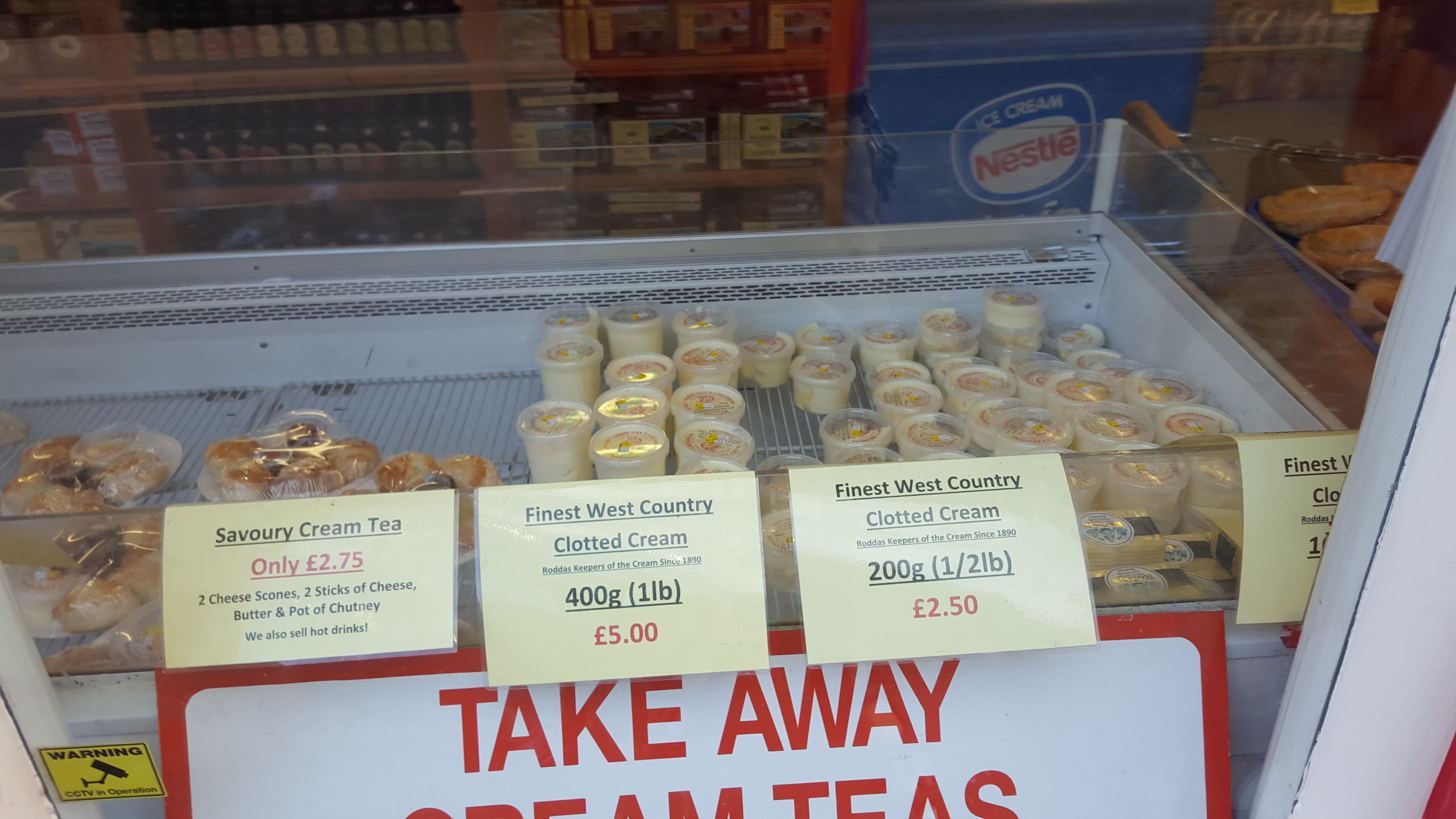
Take away cream teas

Centred on The Strand, Queen Street, Brunswick Place and Park Road, Dawlish has typical retail facilities for a resort town with gift shops, cafes, a fishing tackle shop, beach/toy shops, bakeries, restaurants and pubs, haberdasheries, ice-cream shops including Gay's Creamery, national chains and independent retailers. Along Piermont Place, by Dawlish station and the sea front, are further ice-cream shops, a restaurant, a cafe and a sports-bar with outdoor seating areas. In recent years, a number of art, craft and antiques shops have opened. At the north-eastern end of the town, there is a Sainsbury's supermarket with an Argos outlet and a petrol station.

The largest employment sector in the town is health and social work (23%), due to a large number of care homes, followed by accommodation and food services (20%).

== Religion ==
The town's places of worship are:

- Hope Church (DCF)
- Dawlish Baptist Church
- Dawlish Methodist Church
- Dawlish Strand Church (United Reformed)
- St Agatha's Church (Roman Catholic)
- St Gregory's Church (Anglican)

== Education ==
The primary schools in Dawlish are:

- Gatehouse Primary School
- Westcliff Primary School
- Orchard Manor School.

Dawlish College, formerly Dawlish Community College, in Elm Grove Road, is the main secondary school.

Oakwood Court College is a specialist residential college based in Dawlish, with a satellite college in Torpoint.

== Governance ==
Locally, Dawlish is governed by Dawlish Town Council, which is currently controlled by the Liberal Democrats, as is the next local-government layer above, Teignbridge District Council. Dawlish lies in the parliamentary constituency of Newton Abbot, represented since 2024 by Martin Wrigley of the Liberal Democrats.

== Twinning ==
Dawlish is twinned with the Breton commune of Carhaix-Plouguer in France.

== Notable people ==
- Thomas Vowler Short (1790–1872), academic and clergyman, & Bishop of Sodor and Man and Bishop of St Asaph.
- Herman Merivale (1806–1874), an English civil servant and historian.
- Robert J. Shuttleworth (1810–1874), an English botanist and malacologist.
- Colonel Sir Arthur George Hammond, (1843–1919), recipient of the Victoria Cross
- H. O. Arnold-Forster (1855–1909), a British politician and writer.
- Benjamin Haughton (1865–1924) landscape artist
- Captain Henry Singleton Pennell (1874–1907), recipient of the Victoria Cross
- Igerna Sollas (1877–1965), a British zoologist, palaeontologist and geologist
- Aylward M. Blackman (1883–1956), an Egyptologist, who excavated in Egypt and Nubia, notably Buhen and Meir.
- Paul Britten Austin (1922–2005), author, translator, broadcaster, administrator and scholar of Swedish literature.
- Sir Adrian Frederick Melhuish Smith, PRS (born 1946), statistician and chief executive of the Alan Turing Institute.

== See also ==
- Dawlish, South Australia
