= Dalton =

Dalton may refer to:

== Science ==
- Dalton (crater), a lunar crater
- Dalton (program), chemistry software
- Dalton (unit) (Da), a.k.a. unified atomic mass unit
- John Dalton (1766–1844), chemist, physicist and meteorologist
- 12292 Dalton, an asteroid

== Entertainment ==
- Dalton (Buffyverse), minor character from Buffy the Vampire Slayer television series
- Dalton (band), Danish musical band
- Dalton (Chrono Trigger), non-playable main character in Chrono Trigger
- Dalton (One Piece), a character in One Piece manga and related media
- The Dalton Brothers (band), a parodistic country band created by U2
- The Daltons (Lucky Luke), fictional outlaws in Lucky Luke comic book series and related media
- Dalton Academy, a fictional school in the TV series Glee
- Dalton Russell, character played by Clive Owen in 2006 film Inside Man
- The Daltons (2010 TV series), a French animated TV series

== Places ==
=== United Kingdom ===
- Dalton-le-Dale, County Durham, England
- Dalton-in-Furness, Cumbria (historically in Lancashire), England
- Dalton, Cumbria, near Burton-in-Kendal (historically in Lancashire), England
- Dalton, Dumfries and Galloway, Scotland
- Dalton, Hambleton, North Yorkshire, England
- Dalton, Hexhamshire, a location in Northumberland, England
- Dalton, Lancashire, near Skelmersdale, England
- Dalton, Richmondshire, North Yorkshire, England
- Dalton, South Lanarkshire, a location in Scotland
- Dalton, South Yorkshire, England
- Dalton, Stamfordham, a location in Northumberland, England
- Dalton, West Yorkshire, England

=== United States ===
- Dalton, Georgia
- Dalton Gardens, Idaho
- Dalton City, Illinois
- Dalton, Indiana
- Dalton Township, Wayne County, Indiana
- Dalton, Kansas
- Dalton, Massachusetts
- Dalton Township, Michigan
- Dalton, Minnesota
- Dalton, Missouri
- Dalton, Nebraska
- Dalton, New Hampshire
- Dalton, New York
- Dalton, North Carolina
- Dalton, Ohio
- Dalton, Pennsylvania
- Dalton Creek, a stream in Utah
- Dalton, Wisconsin

=== Elsewhere ===
- Dalton, Algoma District, Ontario
- Dalton Township, Ontario
- Dalton, Israel
- Dalton, KwaZulu-Natal, South Africa
- Dalton, New South Wales, Australia

== Transportation ==
- Dalton Airport (Michigan) in Flushing, Michigan, United States
- Dalton Municipal Airport in Dalton, Georgia
- Dalton Highway, in Alaska, United States
- Dalton Trail, a trail between Alaska and Canada
- Dalton station (Ontario), in Canada
- Dalton railway station, in Cumbria, England

== Other uses ==
- Dalton (given name)
- Dalton (surname)
- Dalton Gang, American Old West outlaws
- Dalton Armoury, Scarborough, Ontario, a Canadian Forces facility
- Dalton Barracks, Royal Air Force station near Abingdon, Oxfordshire
- Dalton Castle, Cumbria, in Dalton-in-Furness, Cumbria, England
- Dalton Plan, an educational concept created by Helen Parkhurst
- Dalton School, a private school in New York City
- Dalton State College, one of eight state colleges in the University System of Georgia
- Dalton tradition, a distinctive shape of stone arrowhead
- Dalton Winery, a winery in Israel
- Four Seasons Hotel & Private Residences, One Dalton Street

== See also ==
- Dalton Hall (disambiguation)
- Dalton High School (disambiguation)
- Dalton's law, a thermodynamic law about partial pressures
- Les Dalton (disambiguation)
- D'Alton
- Daulton (disambiguation)
