= List of United Kingdom locations: Da-Dam =

The United Kingdom

This is part of the list of United Kingdom locations: a gazetteer of place names in the United Kingdom showing each place's locality and geographical coordinates.

== Daa-Dai ==
| Location | Locality | Coordinates (links to map & photo sources) | OS grid reference |
|---|---|---|---|
| Daaey | Shetland Islands | 60.63°N 00.90°W | HU602950 |
| Daccombe | Devon | 50.50°N 03.55°W | SX9068 |
| Dacre | Cumbria | 54.62°N 02.85°W | NY4526 |
| Dacre | North Yorkshire | 54.03°N 01.71°W | SE1960 |
| Dacre Banks | North Yorkshire | 54.04°N 01.71°W | SE1961 |
| Daddry Shield | Durham | 54.72°N 02.17°W | NY8937 |
| Dadford | Buckinghamshire | 52.03°N 01.03°W | SP6638 |
| Dadlington | Leicestershire | 52.57°N 01.41°W | SP4098 |
| Dafen | Carmarthenshire | 51.68°N 04.14°W | SN5201 |
| Daffy Green | Norfolk | 52.64°N 00.89°E | TF9609 |
| Dagdale | Staffordshire | 52.90°N 01.92°W | SK0534 |
| Dagenham | Barking and Dagenham | 51.53°N 00.13°E | TQ4884 |
| Daggons | Dorset | 50.90°N 01.85°W | SU1012 |
| Daglingworth | Gloucestershire | 51.74°N 02.01°W | SO9905 |
| Dagnall | Buckinghamshire | 51.83°N 00.56°W | SP9916 |
| Dagtail End | Worcestershire | 52.26°N 01.95°W | SP0363 |
| Dagworth | Suffolk | 52.20°N 00.98°E | TM0461 |
| Dail Beag | Western Isles | 58.30°N 06.73°W | NB2345 |
| Dail bho Dheas or South Dell | Western Isles | 58.46°N 06.32°W | NB4861 |
| Dail bho Thuath | Western Isles | 58.46°N 06.30°W | NB4961 |
| Daill (Crinan Canal) | Argyll and Bute | 56.05°N 05.50°W | NR8290 |
| Daill (Islay) | Argyll and Bute | 55.77°N 06.21°W | NR3662 |
| Dailly | South Ayrshire | 55.27°N 04.72°W | NS2701 |
| Dail Mòr | Western Isles | 58.29°N 06.76°W | NB2144 |
| Dainton | Devon | 50.48°N 03.62°W | SX8566 |
| Dairsie or Osnaburgh | Fife | 56.34°N 02.95°W | NO4117 |
| Daisy Green (Great Ashfield) | Suffolk | 52.26°N 00.92°E | TM0067 |
| Daisy Green (Wickham Skeith) | Suffolk | 52.27°N 01.06°E | TM0968 |
| Daisy Hill | Leeds | 53.74°N 01.60°W | SE2628 |
| Daisy Hill | Bradford | 53.80°N 01.80°W | SE1334 |
| Daisy Hill | Bolton | 53.53°N 02.52°W | SD6504 |
| Daisy Nook | Oldham | 53.49°N 02.13°W | SD9100 |

== Dal ==
| Location | Locality | Coordinates (links to map & photo sources) | OS grid reference |
|---|---|---|---|
| Dalavich | Argyll and Bute | 56.25°N 05.29°W | NM9612 |
| Dalbeattie | Dumfries and Galloway | 54.93°N 03.82°W | NX8361 |
| Dalblair | East Ayrshire | 55.44°N 04.15°W | NS6419 |
| Dalbury | Derbyshire | 52.90°N 01.61°W | SK2634 |
| Dalby | North Yorkshire | 54.13°N 01.03°W | SE6371 |
| Dalby | Isle of Man | 54.17°N 04.74°W | SC2179 |
| Dalby | Lincolnshire | 53.20°N 00.09°E | TF4070 |
| Dalchalm | Highland | 58.02°N 03.86°W | NC9005 |
| Dallcharn | Highland | 58.48°N 04.36°W | NC6258 |
| Dalchreichart | Highland | 57.16°N 04.82°W | NH2912 |
| Dalderby | Lincolnshire | 53.17°N 00.14°W | TF2466 |
| Dale | Pembrokeshire | 51.70°N 05.18°W | SM8005 |
| Dale | Cumbria | 54.78°N 02.71°W | NY5444 |
| Dale | Oldham | 53.56°N 02.03°W | SD9808 |
| Dale Abbey | Derbyshire | 52.93°N 01.36°W | SK4338 |
| Dalebank | Derbyshire | 53.14°N 01.46°W | SK3661 |
| Dale Bottom | Cumbria | 54.57°N 03.10°W | NY2921 |
| Dale Brow | Cheshire | 53.28°N 02.15°W | SJ9076 |
| Dale End | North Yorkshire | 53.91°N 02.06°W | SD9646 |
| Dale End | Derbyshire | 53.14°N 01.68°W | SK2161 |
| Dale Hill | East Sussex | 51.04°N 00.42°E | TQ7030 |
| Dalelia | Highland | 56.75°N 05.71°W | NM7369 |
| Dale Moor | Derbyshire | 52.93°N 01.34°W | SK4438 |
| Dale of Walls | Shetland Islands | 60.25°N 01.67°W | HU1852 |
| Dales Brow | Salford | 53.49°N 02.34°W | SD7700 |
| Dales Green | Staffordshire | 53.10°N 02.22°W | SJ8556 |
| Dalestorth | Nottinghamshire | 53.13°N 01.25°W | SK5060 |
| Dalfaber | Highland | 57.19°N 03.82°W | NH9013 |
| Dalfoil | Stirling | 56.06°N 04.29°W | NS5788 |
| Dalgarven | North Ayrshire | 55.66°N 04.72°W | NS2945 |
| Dalgety Bay | Fife | 56.03°N 03.36°W | NT1583 |
| Dalginross | Perth and Kinross | 56.36°N 03.99°W | NN7721 |
| Dalguise | Perth and Kinross | 56.60°N 03.64°W | NN9947 |
| Dalhally | Angus | 56.81°N 03.32°W | NO1970 |
| Dalhalvaig | Highland | 58.46°N 03.90°W | NC8954 |
| Dalham | Suffolk | 52.22°N 00.51°E | TL7261 |
| Dalhenzean | Perth and Kinross | 56.79°N 03.44°W | NO1268 |
| Daliburgh | Western Isles | 57.16°N 07.37°W | NF7521 |
| Dalintart | Argyll and Bute | 56.40°N 05.47°W | NM8629 |
| Dalkeith | Midlothian | 55.89°N 03.05°W | NT3467 |
| Dallam | Cheshire | 53.40°N 02.61°W | SJ5990 |
| Dallas | Moray | 57.55°N 03.47°W | NJ1252 |
| Dallicott | Shropshire | 52.54°N 02.34°W | SO7794 |
| Dallimores | Isle of Wight | 50.73°N 01.26°W | SZ5293 |
| Dallinghoo | Suffolk | 52.14°N 01.30°E | TM2655 |
| Dallington | East Sussex | 50.94°N 00.34°E | TQ6519 |
| Dallington | Northamptonshire | 52.24°N 00.93°W | SP7361 |
| Dallow | North Yorkshire | 54.13°N 01.71°W | SE1971 |
| Dalmally | Argyll and Bute | 56.39°N 04.98°W | NN1627 |
| Dalmarnock | South Lanarkshire | 55.83°N 04.22°W | NS6162 |
| Dalmary | Stirling | 56.12°N 04.39°W | NS5195 |
| Dalmellington | East Ayrshire | 55.32°N 04.39°W | NS4806 |
| Dalmeny | City of Edinburgh | 55.97°N 03.37°W | NT1477 |
| Dalmilling | South Ayrshire | 55.46°N 04.59°W | NS3622 |
| Dalmore | Highland | 57.68°N 04.24°W | NH6668 |
| Dalmore | Angus | 56.48°N 02.74°W | NO5433 |
| Dalmuir | West Dunbartonshire | 55.89°N 04.41°W | NS4970 |
| Dalnabreck | Highland | 56.75°N 05.76°W | NM7069 |
| Dalneigh | Highland | 57.46°N 04.25°W | NH6544 |
| Dalness | Highland | 56.61°N 05.00°W | NN1651 |
| Dalqueich | Perth and Kinross | 56.22°N 03.48°W | NO0804 |
| Dalreavoch | Highland | 58.04°N 04.11°W | NC7508 |
| Dalriach | Perth and Kinross | 56.70°N 04.05°W | NN7459 |
| Dalry | City of Edinburgh | 55.93°N 03.23°W | NT2372 |
| Dalry | North Ayrshire | 55.70°N 04.72°W | NS2949 |
| Dalrymple | East Ayrshire | 55.39°N 04.59°W | NS3614 |
| Dalscote | Northamptonshire | 52.18°N 01.00°W | SP6854 |
| Dalserf | South Lanarkshire | 55.72°N 03.92°W | NS7950 |
| Dalshannon | North Lanarkshire | 55.92°N 04.03°W | NS7372 |
| Dalston | Hackney | 51.53°N 00.06°W | TQ3484 |
| Dalston | Cumbria | 54.84°N 02.99°W | NY3650 |
| Dalswinton | Dumfries and Galloway | 55.14°N 03.68°W | NX9385 |
| Dalton | Cumbria | 54.17°N 02.70°W | SD5476 |
| Dalton | Dumfries and Galloway | 55.05°N 03.39°W | NY1174 |
| Dalton | Kirklees | 53.64°N 01.75°W | SE1616 |
| Dalton | Lancashire | 53.56°N 02.77°W | SD4908 |
| Dalton (Stamfordham) | Northumberland | 55.03°N 01.82°W | NZ1171 |
| Dalton (Hexhamshire) | Northumberland | 54.91°N 02.14°W | NY9158 |
| Dalton (Hambleton) | North Yorkshire | 54.17°N 01.34°W | SE4376 |
| Dalton (Richmondshire) | North Yorkshire | 54.46°N 01.83°W | NZ1108 |
| Dalton | Rotherham | 53.44°N 01.32°W | SK4594 |
| Dalton | South Lanarkshire | 55.79°N 04.13°W | NS6658 |
| Dalton-In-Furness | Cumbria | 54.15°N 03.18°W | SD2374 |
| Dalton-le-Dale | Durham | 54.81°N 01.37°W | NZ4047 |
| Dalton Magna | Rotherham | 53.43°N 01.30°W | SK4693 |
| Dalton-on-Tees | North Yorkshire | 54.45°N 01.55°W | NZ2907 |
| Dalton Parva | Rotherham | 53.43°N 01.32°W | SK4593 |
| Dalton Piercy | Hartlepool | 54.67°N 01.28°W | NZ4631 |
| Daltote | Argyll and Bute | 55.98°N 05.60°W | NR7583 |
| Dalvanie | Angus | 56.77°N 03.34°W | NO1866 |
| Dalwhinnie | Highland | 56.92°N 04.25°W | NN6384 |
| Dalwood | Devon | 50.79°N 03.07°W | ST2400 |

== Dam ==
| Location | Locality | Coordinates (links to map & photo sources) | OS grid reference |
|---|---|---|---|
| Damask Green | Hertfordshire | 51.94°N 00.18°W | TL2529 |
| Damems | Bradford | 53.84°N 01.94°W | SE0439 |
| Damerham | Hampshire | 50.93°N 01.85°W | SU1015 |
| Damery | South Gloucestershire | 51.64°N 02.43°W | ST7094 |
| Damgate (Martham) | Norfolk | 52.71°N 01.62°E | TG4519 |
| Damgate (Acle) | Norfolk | 52.62°N 01.54°E | TG4009 |
| Dam Green | Norfolk | 52.42°N 01.01°E | TM0585 |
| Dam Head | Calderdale | 53.73°N 01.84°W | SE1027 |
| Damhead | Aberdeenshire | 57.32°N 02.45°W | NJ7326 |
| Damhead Holdings | Midlothian | 55.88°N 03.20°W | NT2566 |
| Dam Mill | Staffordshire | 52.61°N 02.17°W | SJ8802 |
| Damsay | Orkney Islands | 59.00°N 03.06°W | HY389139 |
| Damside | Scottish Borders | 55.71°N 03.33°W | NT1648 |
| Dam Side | Lancashire | 53.92°N 02.91°W | SD4048 |
