= Damery =

Damery may refer to:

== Places ==
- Damery, Gloucestershire, a United Kingdom location
- Damery, Marne, France
- Damery, Somme, France

== People with the surname ==
- Walther Damery (1610 – after 1672), Flemish Baroque painter

== Other uses ==
- Damery (grape), another name for the French wine grape Folle Blanche
