= John Ash (divine) =

English Baptist minister and dictionary author (18th c.)

John Ash (c. 1724–1779) was an English Baptist minister at Pershore, Worcestershire, and author of an English dictionary and grammar books.

== Life ==
Ash was born in Dorset about 1724. He studied for the ministry at Bristol, under Bernard Foskett, became pastor at Loughwood Meeting House, a Baptist chapel near the village of Dalwood in Dorset, and while there contributed to periodicals. He settled in the ministry at Pershore in 1746, as the result of a compromise between different parties in the congregation.

He obtained a degree of LL.D. from a Scottish university in 1774, and died at Pershore in March or April 1779, aged 55.

== Works ==
Ash is best known as a lexicographer, author of:

- New and Complete Dictionary of the English Language... To which is prefixed a comprehensive grammar. Vol I; Vol. II, 1775, 2nd edition 1795.

Ash's New and Complete Dictionary was noteworthy for the number of obsolete and provincial words contained in it. It incorporated most of Nathan Bailey's collection of canting words. This dictionary was the first to define in English the previously omitted words fuck and cunt. His debt to Samuel Johnson was demonstrated in a famous error in his etymology of the word curmudgeon, which he says derives from the French for "unknown correspondent"; Johnson's A Dictionary of the English Language from twenty years before had suggested (erroneously, as it happens) that the word derives from "cœur méchant" (malicious-hearted), attributing his information to an "unknown correspondent". Ash's Dictionary is mentioned in Thomas Hardy's novel Far from the Madding Crowd.

An earlier work was:

- Grammatical Institutes. It has been commented that "Ash understood much better than Lowth what it took to write a grammar for children."

Other works:

- Sentiments on Education, collected from the best writers; properly methodized, and interspersed with occasional observations. Vol. I; Vol. II, 1777
- The perfecting of the saints for the work of the ministry. A sermon, preached in Broad-Mead, Bristol, before the Bristol Education Society, August 12, 1778, 1778
- Dialogues of Eumenes.'

== Notes ==
Attribution

This article incorporates text from a publication now in the public domain: "Ash, John (1724?-1779)". Dictionary of National Biography. London: Smith, Elder & Co. 1885–1900.
