= Dalton Airport =

Dalton Airport may refer to:

- Dalton Airport (Michigan) in Flushing, Michigan, United States (FAA: 3DA)
- Dalton Municipal Airport in Dalton, Georgia, United States (FAA: DNN)
