= Axminster =

Town in Devon, England

Coordinates: 50.781°N 3.000°W

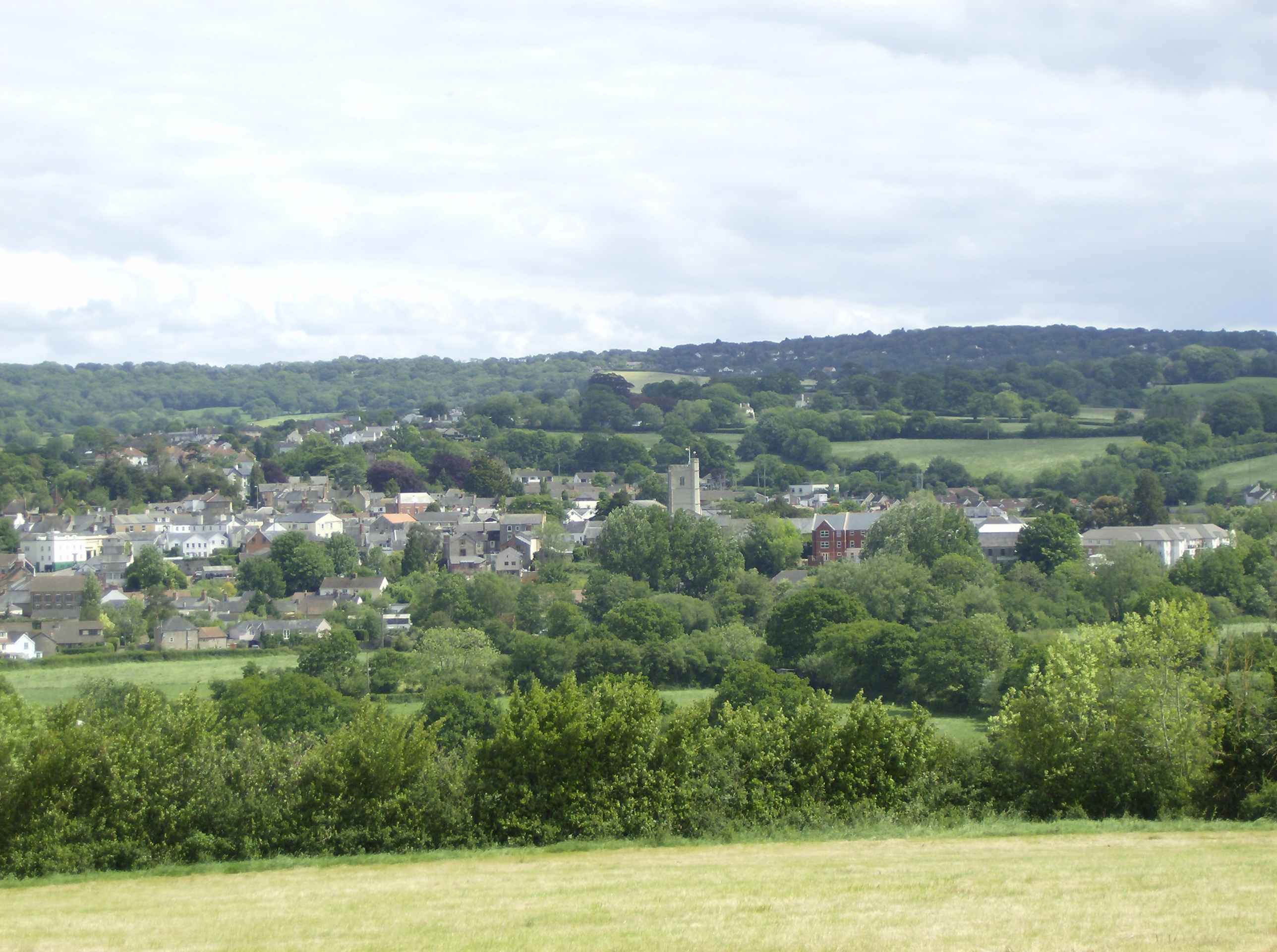
- View of Axminster

- Coat of arms

- Location within Devon
- Population: 8,118 (2021 Census)
- OS grid reference: SY2998
- Civil parish: Axminster
- District: East Devon
- Shire county: Devon
- Region: South West
- Country: England
- Sovereign state: United Kingdom
- Post town: AXMINSTER
- Postcode district: EX13
- Dialling code: 01297
- Police: Devon and Cornwall
- Fire: Devon and Somerset
- Ambulance: South Western
- UK Parliament: Honiton and Sidmouth

Axminster is a market town and civil parish on the eastern border of the county of Devon in England. It is 28 miles (45 km) from the county town of Exeter. The town is built on a hill overlooking the River Axe which heads towards the English Channel at Axmouth, and is in the East Devon local government district. At the 2011 census, the parish had a population of 6,557, increasing to 8,118 at the 2021 census. The town contains two electoral wards (town and rural) whose combined population is 8,125. The market is still held every Thursday.

Axminster gave its name to a type of carpet. An Axminster-type power loom is capable of weaving high-quality carpets with many varying colours and patterns. While Axminster carpets are made in the town by Axminster Carpets Ltd, this type of carpet is now manufactured all over the world as well.

== History ==
The town dates back to the Celtic times of around 300 BC. It lies on two major Roman roads: the Fosse Way from Lincoln to Seaton, and the Dorchester to Exeter road. There was a Roman fort on the crossroads at Woodbury Farm, just south of the present town. Axminster appears on the Peutinger Map, one of only 15 British towns on that Roman era map.

Axminster was recorded in the late 9th century as Ascanmynster and in the Domesday Book of 1086 as Aixeministra. The name means "monastery or large church by the River Axe" and is a mixture of languages; the river name Axe has Celtic origins and mynster is an Old English word.

There was allegedly a castle in the town, as reported in the 1600s by Sir William Pole, and believed to have been close to the current Market Square.

The later history of the town is very much linked to the carpet industry, started by Thomas Whitty at Court House near the church in 1755. The completion of the early hand-tufted carpets was marked by a peal of bells from the parish church as it took a great amount of time and labour to complete them. Axminster carpets continue to this day providing carpets for Buckingham Palace, Windsor Castle and other royal buildings.

In 1210, a charter was granted to the town that included the right to hold a weekly cattle market; this was held in the market square until it was moved to Trinity Square in 1834. It then moved in October 1912 to a site off South Street, where it was held for 94 years. It finally closed in 2006 in the aftermath of the 2001 United Kingdom foot-and-mouth outbreak. A building on the site then continued to be used for a general auction until all the buildings were demolished and replaced by a housing development.

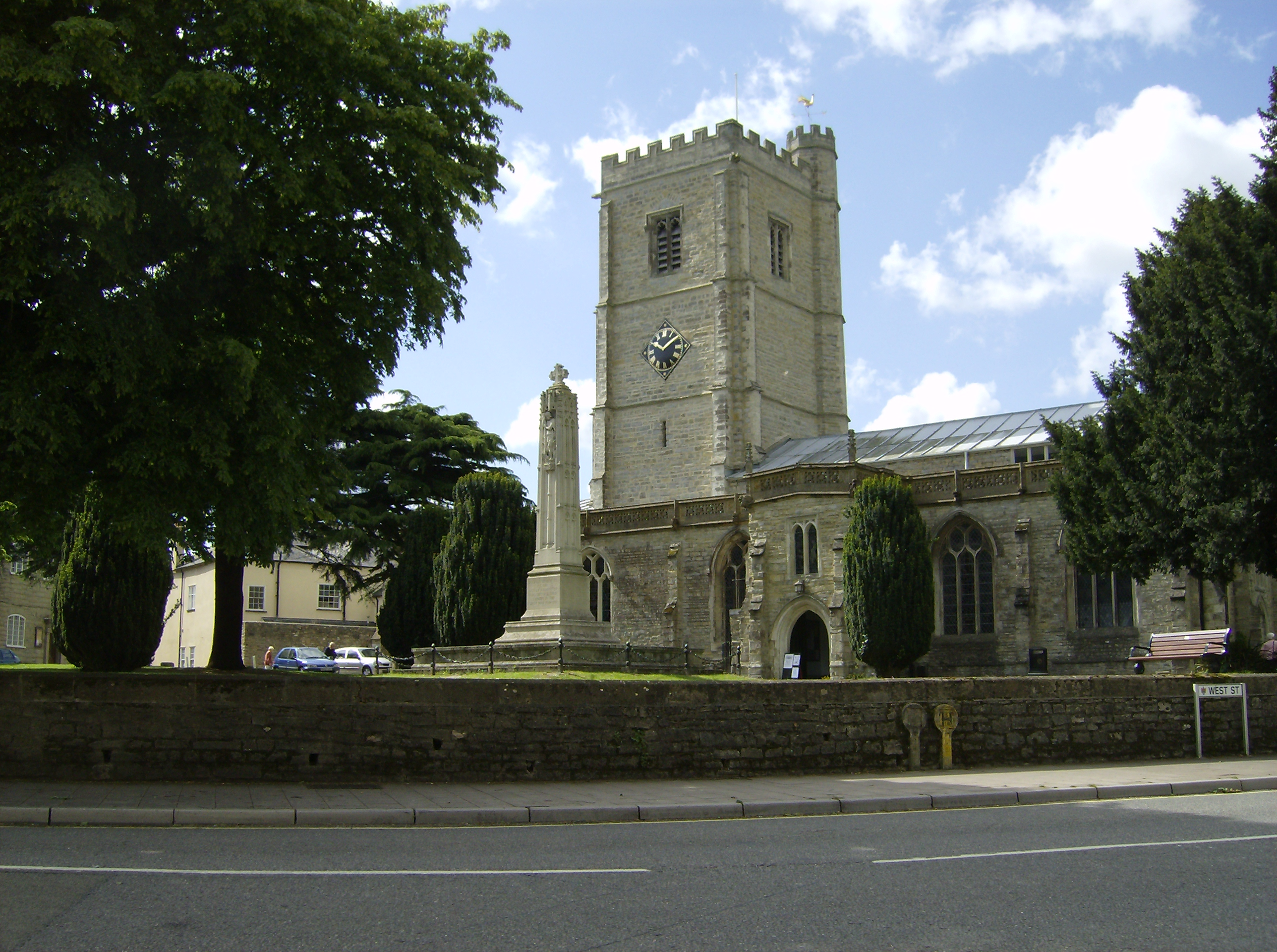
Axminster Parish Church (St Mary's)

The town was on the coaching route from London to Exeter. In 1760 a coaching inn named The George Hotel was opened on the corner of Lyme Street and Chard Street on the site of an old inn called the Cross Keys that was destroyed by fire in 1759. Over 16 coaches a day would stop at the hotel in its heyday for refreshments and to change horses. The building was refurbished in 2020. Axminster was on the route of The Trafalgar Way which is the name given to the historic route used to carry dispatches with the news of the Battle of Trafalgar overland from Falmouth, Cornwall, to the Admiralty in London in 1805, There is a plaque commemorating this fact in the town centre.

The population in the 1841 census was 2,139 inhabitants.

Part of the parish of Axminster had historically been an exclave of Dorset until the Counties (Detached Parts) Act 1844, when it was fully incorporated into Devon.

Axminster railway station was opened on 19 July 1860, with the London and South Western Railway (LSWR) offering direct services between Queen Street station in Exeter and Yeovil. The station building was designed by the LSWR's architect Sir William Tite in mock gothic style. In 1903, the branch line from Axminster to Lyme Regis was opened. This branch line was closed with the Beeching cuts, in the 1960s. One engine has been preserved on the Bluebell Line, in Sussex, while the station was dismantled and reconstructed at New Alresford, on the Watercress Line, in Hampshire.

Axminster is the southern starting point of the Taunton Stop Line, a World War II defensive line consisting of pillboxes and anti-tank obstacles, which runs north to the Somerset coast near Highbridge.

Nearby Kilmington was used as a location for the 1998 LWT adaptation of Tess of the d'Urbervilles. The celebrity chef and TV presenter Hugh Fearnley-Whittingstall has his River Cottage HQ at a 60-acre (24 ha) farm in the Axe valley. His "River Cottage Canteen" was until 2021 located in the premises of the New Commercial Inn, owned by Palmer's Brewery of Bridport, and which housed the ballroom of the town.

== Geography ==
The hamlet of Abbey Gate lies to the south of the town near the A35 and A358 intersection.

Other villages within 5 miles (8 km) of Axminster include Chardstock, Colyford, Combpyne, Dalwood, Hawkchurch, Kilmington, Membury, Musbury, Raymond's Hill, Rousdon, Shute, Smallridge, Tytherleigh, Uplyme and Whitford.

== Landmarks ==
- Axminster Museum
- Blackdown Hills Area of Outstanding Natural Beauty
- East Devon Area of Outstanding Natural Beauty
- East Devon Way
- Forde Abbey
- Jurassic Coast
- Lambert's Castle
- Loughwood Meeting House
- Musbury Castle
- Shute Barton

== Amenities ==
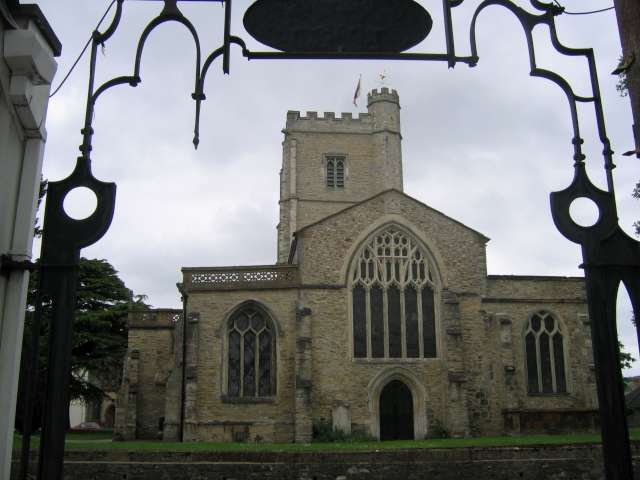
St Mary's Church

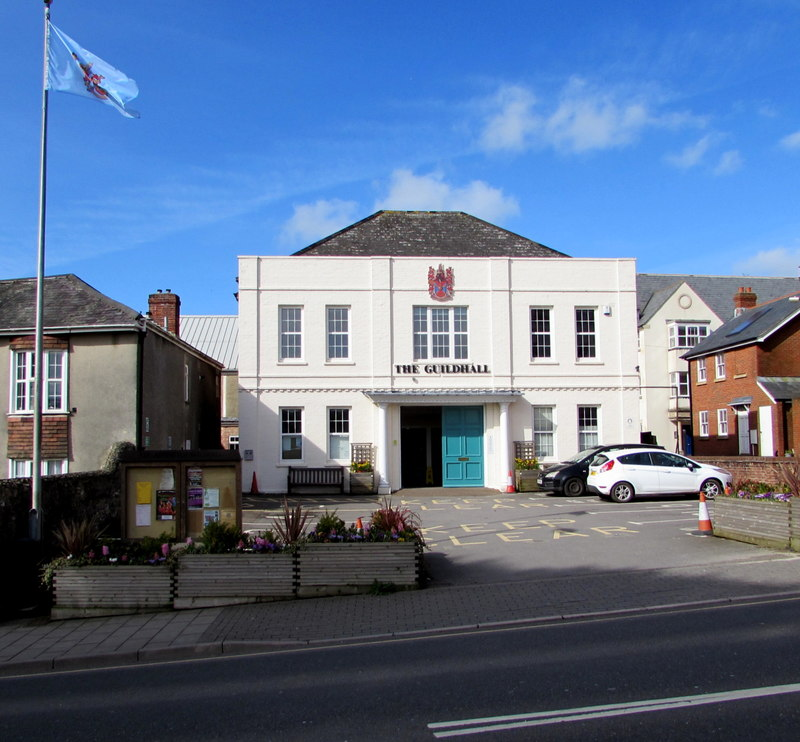
Axminster Guildhall

The town has Cloakham Lawns, the Axe Valley Sports Centre and Flamingo Swimming Pool, a library, several churches and a museum of local history. Shops include three supermarkets, and several independent retailers. Axminster Guildhall is a municipal building which is currently used as an events venue.

== Education ==
- Axe Valley Academy
- Axminster Community Primary School
- St. Mary's Primary School
- All Saints Community Primary School

== Media ==
Local news and television programmes are provided by BBC South West and ITV West Country. Television signals are received from the Stockland Hill TV transmitter.

Local radio stations are BBC Radio Devon on 95.8 FM, Heart West on 97 FM, Radio Exe Devon on 107.3 FM, Greatest Hits Radio South West on 106.7 FM, and East Devon Radio, a community radio station which broadcast to the town on 94.6 FM.

The town is served by the local newspaper, Midweek Herald.

== Transport ==
=== Road ===
Axminster is at the crossroads of the A358, which links with the A303 at Ilminster, and the A35 from Southampton to Honiton, which has been diverted by a bypass to the south of the town.

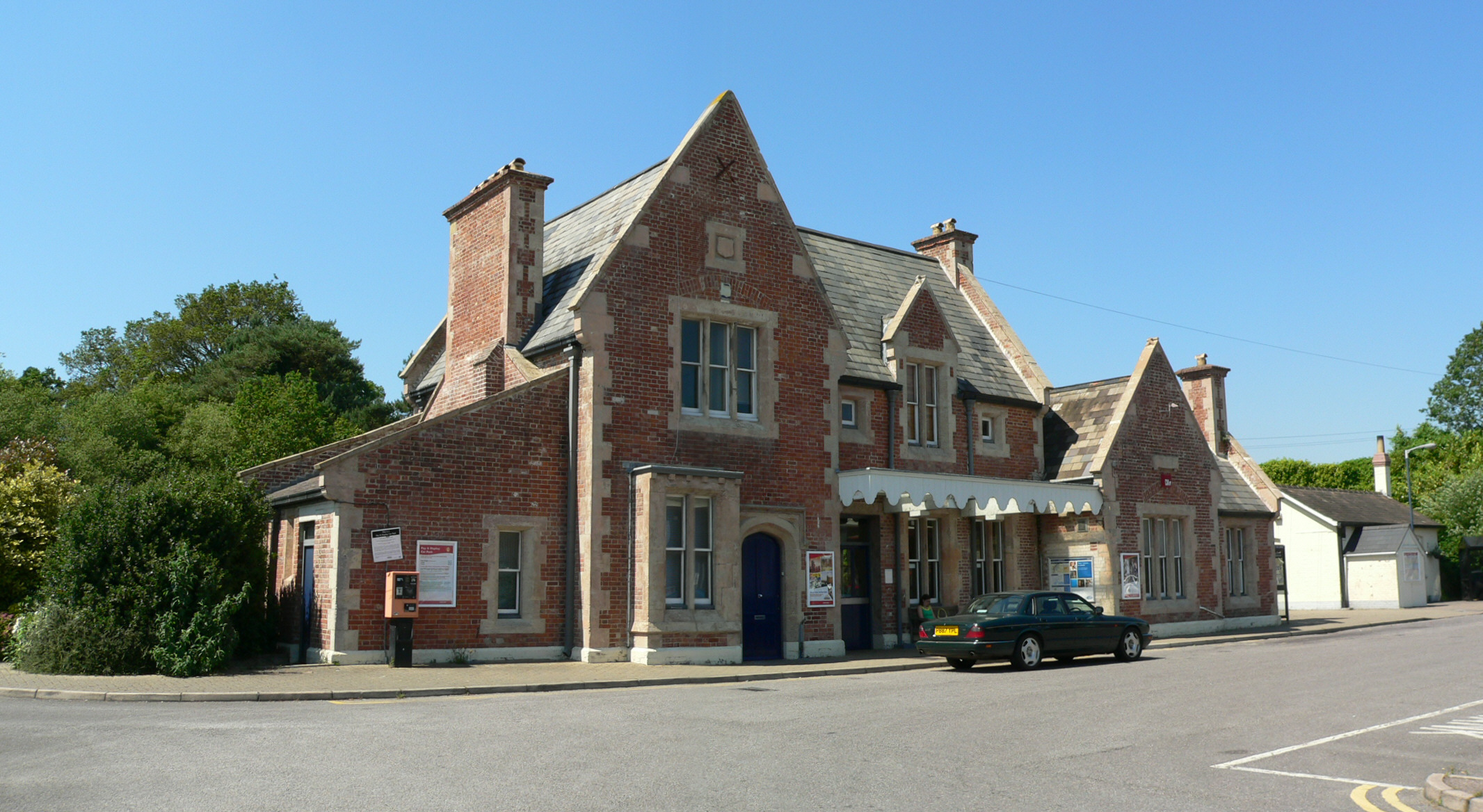
Axminster station

=== Rail ===
Axminster railway station is on the West of England Main Line that runs from Exeter via Salisbury to London Waterloo.

=== Bus ===
Axminster is served by multiple bus companies. First is AVMT buses which runs to surroundings towns and villages. Secondly is Stagecoach South West with services to Honiton and Exeter. Next is First South West running to Chard and Taunton. Finally, First Hampshire & Dorset run services to Bridport, Dorchester and Weymouth.

=== Coach Excursions ===
Lomax Tours run coach day trips from Axminster to places of interest.

=== Air ===
Axminster is 23 miles away from Exeter Airport by road.

== Twin towns ==
Axminster is twinned with:

- Douvres-la-Délivrande, France

== Historic estates ==
- Weycroft, Axminster

== Notable people ==
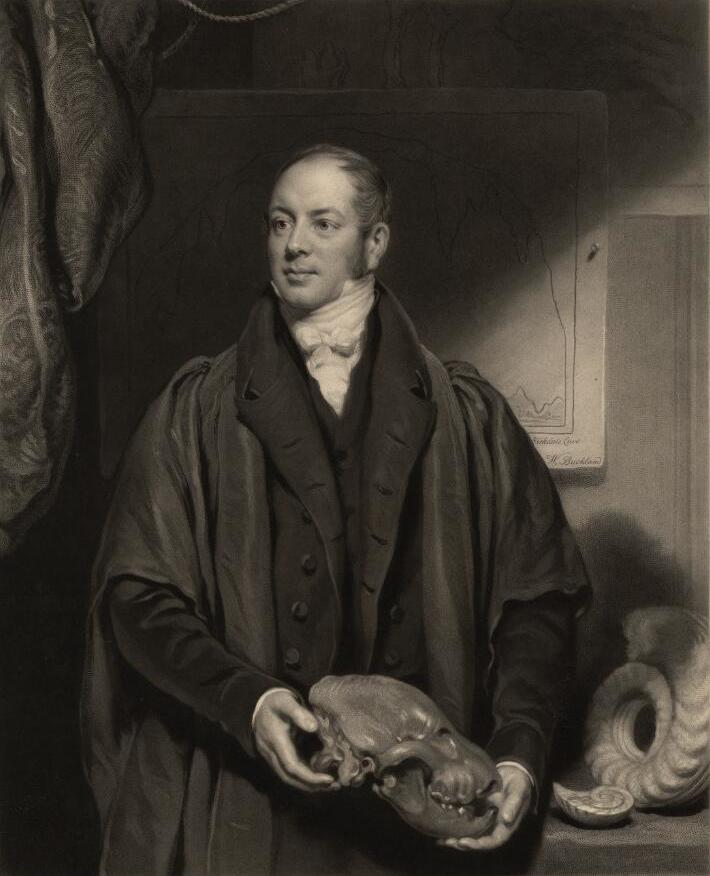
William Buckland, 1833

- John Prince (1643–1723), vicar of Totnes, a biographer and wrote Worthies of Devon
- John Ashwood (1657–1706), nonconformist minister and author.
- Micaiah Towgood (1700–1792), dissenting minister in Exeter, of Arian views.
- William Buckland (1784–1856), theologian, Dean of Westminster, a geologist and palaeontologist.
- George Pulman (1819–1880), journalist, antiquary and writer on fishing.
- Clemence Dane (1888–1965), playwright and novelist
- Steve Benbow (1931–2006), folk musician, worked locally
- Tyler Dibling (born 2006), professional footballer

== Freedom of the Town ==
The following people and military units have received the Freedom of the Town of Axminster.

=== Individuals ===
- Susan Spiller: 13 January 2022.
- Martin Spurway: 13 November 2023.

== See also ==
- Taunton Stop Line
