= Holy City, Devon =

Hamlet in Devon, England

Coordinates: 50.8405°N 2.9983°W

Holy City
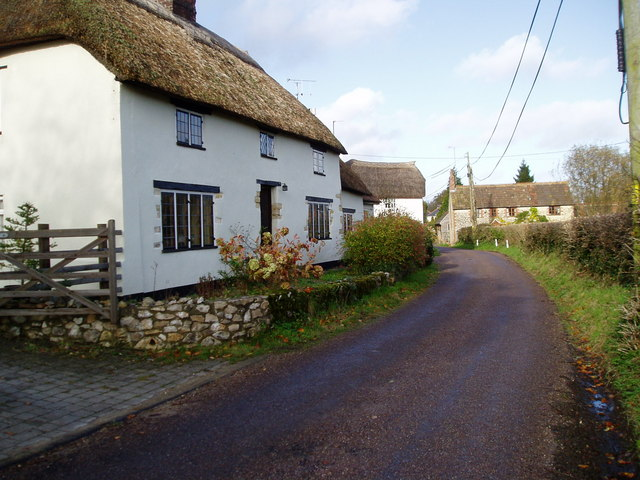
- The Cottage, Holy City

- Location within Devon
- Population: 157 (2001)
- OS grid reference: ST297050
- Civil parish: Chardstock
- District: East Devon
- Shire county: Devon
- Region: South West
- Country: England
- Sovereign state: United Kingdom
- Post town: EXETER
- Postcode district: EX5
- Dialling code: 01404
- Police: Devon and Cornwall
- Fire: Devon and Somerset
- Ambulance: South Western
- UK Parliament: Honiton and Sidmouth

Holy City is a hamlet in the parish of Chardstock, East Devon, England. It is approximately 5 miles (8.0 km) due north of the town of Axminster, and 4 miles (6.4 km) from the nearest small town of Chard (Somerset).
