= Dalton (given name) =

Dalton is a masculine given name. Notable people with the name include:

- Dalton Baldwin (1931–2019), American accompanist
- Dalton Bales (1920–1979), Canadian lawyer and politician
- Dalton Bancroft (born 2001), Canadian ice hockey player
- Dalton Banks, American politician
- Dalton Bell (born 1983), American football player
- Dalton Brooks (born 2004), American football player
- Dalton Caldwell (born 1980), American technologist and digital music entrepreneur
- Dalton Camp (1920–2002), Canadian commentator, journalist, politician, and political strategist
- Dalton Cathey (1946–1990), American actor
- Dalton Conley (born 1969), American professor and sociologist
- Dalton Conyngham (1897–1979), South African cricketer
- Dalton Cooper (born 2001), American football player
- Dalton Crossan (born 1994), American football player
- Dalton Davis (born 1990), South African rugby union player
- Dalton Day (born 1991), American actor and singer
- Dalton Delan (born 1954), American columnist, writer, and television producer
- Dalton Eatherly (born 1997), better known as Chud The Builder, American livestreamer
- Dalton Freeman (born 1990), American football player
- Dalton Gau, American politician
- Dalton Gomez (born 1995), American real estate entrepreneur
- Dalton Gooding (born 1954), Australian businessman
- Dalton E. Gray (born 1997), American actor
- Dalton Guthrie (born 1995), American baseball player
- Dalton Harris (born 1993), American singer
- Dalton Hilliard (born 1964), American football player
- Dalton Hoffman (born 1941), American football player
- Dalton Holder (born 1953), Barbadian cricket umpire
- Dalton James (born 1971), American actor
- Dalton Johnson (born 2003), American football player
- Dalton Jones (born 1943), American baseball player
- Dalton Keene (born 1999), American football player
- Dalton Kellett (born 1993), Canadian racing driver
- Dalton Kincaid (born 1999), American football player
- Dalton Knecht (born 2001), American basketball player
- Dalton Maldonado (born 1995), American activist and basketball player
- Dalton McCarthy (1836–1898), Canadian lawyer and parliamentarian
- Dalton McGuinty Sr. (born 1926–1990), Canadian politician, father of Dalton
- Dalton McGuinty (born 1955), Canadian politician, son of Dalton Sr.
- Dalton L. McMichael (1914–2001), American philanthropist and textile executive
- Dalton Moore (born 1994), Canadian surgeon and doctor
- Dalton Murray (1911–1984), British diplomat
- Dalton Pando (born 1996), American soccer player
- Dalton Papali'i (born 1997), New Zealand rugby union player
- Dalton Paranaguá (1927–2014), Brazilian doctor and politician
- Dalton Paula (born 1982), Brazilian artist
- Dalton Philips (born 1968), Irish businessman
- Dalton Polius (born 1990), Saint Lucian cricketer
- Dalton Pompey (born 1992), Canadian baseball player
- Dalton Powell (born 1942), American musician
- Dalton Prejean (1959–1990), American murderer
- Dalton Pritchard (1921–2010), American electrical engineer and color television systems pioneer
- Dalton Prout (born 1990), Canadian ice hockey player
- Dalton Rapattoni (born 1996), American musician, singer, and songwriter
- Dalton S. Reymond (1896–1978), American author, professor, and screenwriter
- Dalton Risner (born 1995), American football player
- Dalton Rogers (born 2001), American baseball player
- Dalton Rushing (born 2001), American baseball player
- Dalton Sargeant (born 1998), American racing driver
- Dalton Schoen (born 1996), American football player
- Dalton Schultz (born 1996), American football player
- Dalton Smarsh, Canadian football player
- Dalton Tagelagi (born 1968), Niuean politician
- Dalton Tanonaka (born 1954), American television executive
- Dalton Trevisan (1925–2024), Brazilian short story writer
- Dalton Truax (1935–2019), American football player
- Dalton Trumbo (1905–1976), American screenwriter
- Dalton Tucker (born 2000), American football player
- Dalton Vigh (born 1964), Brazilian actor
- Dalton Wagner (born 1998), American football player
- Dalton F. Warren (1894–1942), American politician
- Dalton Wilkins (born 1999), New Zealand soccer player

== See also ==
- Dalton (disambiguation)
- Dalton (surname)
- Danton (name)
