= Ashurst House =

Ashurst House may refer to:

- Ashurst House (Flagstaff, Arizona), listed on the National Register of Historic Places in Coconino County, Arizona
- Ashurst House (Highgate, London), demolished former residence of Sir William Ashurst, Lord Mayor of London
- Craig Ashurst House, Nicholasville, Kentucky, listed on the National Register of Historic Places in Jessamine County, Kentucky
