= The George Inn =

The George Inn may refer to:

- The George Inn, Bridport, Dorset, England
- The George Inn, Chardstock, Devon, England
- The George Inn, Derby, a Grade II listed building
- The George Inn, Norton St Philip, a Grade I listed building
- The George Inn, Southwark, a public house established in the medieval period
- The George Inn, Grantham, Grantham, a public house built in 1780
- The George Inn, Portland, Isle of Portland, Dorset, England
- The George Inn, Thoralby

== See also ==
- George Washington Inn, Washington
