= Axminster Museum =

Coordinates: 50°46′52.5″N 2°59′59.5″W

Map showing the location of Axminster Museum within Devon.

Axminster Museum was the town museum situated in the Old Police Station and Courthouse opposite St. Mary's Church in the centre of the town of Axminster, Devon, England. It was founded in 1982.

The Old Court House was built in the 1860s on the site of the old workhouse. The two-storey stone building has five bays with three asymmetrical gables. The current main doorway was a carriage entrance. The building is a Grade II listed building.

The collections included exhibits related to the town's carpet industry founded by Thomas Whitty in 1755. There are also agricultural tools, archaeological finds, Coins and Medals, Costumes and Textiles, old photographs, archives and occasional special exhibitions. It is also possible to see the old police cells and courtroom. In 2015 Axminster Heritage Ltd took over the management and care of the Axminster Museum Collection and moved it into their nearby Heritage Centre development.

In 2015 a grant of £69,700 was obtained from the Heritage Lottery Fund for the development of a museum in the nearby Thomas Whitty House, Silver Street as part of a heritage centre. The heritage centre opened in 2016 and many of the exhibits from the museum were moved into the new centre, based in the old carpet factory.

Further Heritage Lottery Funding saw a complete redevelopment of the museum area within the Heritage Centre which reopened in April 2019. The new displays included the installation of an original 1937 Crabtree Gripper Loom which had been used at the Axminster Carpet factory opened in 1937 by Harry Dutfield.

The building also houses the town's tourist information centre.
