= Imeem =

Defunct social media website

imeem
- Website type: Viral content sharing, social network service
- Founded: 2003
- Dissolved: 2009
- Owner: News Corp.
- Creators: Dalton Caldwell, Jan Jannink
- Commercial: Mixed
- Registration: Free, required to play many full-length songs
- Launched: 2003; 23 years ago
- Current status: Defunct

imeem was a social media website where users interacted with each other by streaming, uploading and sharing music and music videos. It operated from 2003 until 2009 when it was shut down after being acquired by MySpace.

The company was founded in 2003 by Dalton Caldwell (formerly of VA Linux) and Jan Jannink (formerly of Napster), and many of its core engineering team came from the original Napster file-sharing service. The company takes its name from "meme", a term coined by biologist Richard Dawkins to describe the ideas and cultural phenomena that spread as if they had a life of their own.

Helping to pioneer the free, advertising-supported model for online music, imeem permitted consumers to legally upload, stream and share music and music playlists for free with the costs supported by advertising. In 2007, imeem became the first-ever online music site to secure licenses from all four U.S. major music labels to offer their music catalogs for free streaming and sharing on the web.

The company also created the web's first embeddable music and video playlists. People could use imeem's widgets to embed songs and playlists from imeem virtually anywhere on the web, including on their MySpace and Facebook profiles or on their personal blogs.

Headquartered in San Francisco's South of Market district (SoMa), imeem had additional offices in New York City and Los Angeles. The company's investors included Morgenthaler Ventures and Warner Music Group.

On December 8, 2009, imeem was bought out by MySpace Music in a firesale for an undisclosed amount. However, it is stated to have been less than US$1 million.

== Business model ==
Revenue generation at imeem was through a combination of direct and indirect advertising sales, sales of MP3 downloads, ringtones and concert tickets, and subscription revenue from premium services. The bulk of its revenue came from advertising; advertisers who ran direct campaigns with imeem included TheTruth.com/American Legacy Foundation, Kia Motors, and Dr Pepper, among others.

The company was one of the pioneers of the ad-supported streaming music model. In 2007, imeem became the first-ever online music site to secure licenses from all four major music labels to offer their music catalogs for free streaming and sharing on the web.

Under this model, artists and labels were paid a share of imeem's ad revenue in proportion to the popularity of their music on imeem, and had the right to register their content and determine how (or whether) that content is available on the site or through its embeddable widgets.

This business model was made possible by imeem's proprietary content fingerprinting and digital registry technology. Initially, imeem licensed this technology from SNOCAP, the digital rights and content management startup founded by Napster creator Shawn Fanning. In 2008, imeem acquired SNOCAP and its technology outright. imeem continued to operate the SNOCAP digital registry, and used the technology acquired from SNOCAP to power its ad-supported streaming music service.

== Products ==
The company provided two main services: imeem.com, where people could discover, stream and share music and music videos for free, and imeem Mobile, an Internet radio service for mobile devices. In addition, the company offered a premium service, imeem VIP, that gave people access to additional features on the imeem site.

=== imeem.com ===
Registered users of the site could stream and share millions of songs and tens of thousands of music videos free of charge, with the costs for licensing and streaming supported by advertising on the site and on imeem Mobile.

One of imeem's key features was the playlist. Users could create personal playlists, via a "Create Music Playlist" page, with music they had uploaded themselves or with music and video already available on the site. They could publish and share these playlists on imeem, where they could be played by, shared with, commented on, or tagged by other users.

Visitors could also share music, videos and playlists beyond imeem, either by embedding imeem players into external sites.

=== imeem Mobile ===
With the free cell phone application imeem Mobile, users could discover, purchase and enjoy music on their mobile device. It was available as a free download to users on the Android and iPhone/iPod Touch platforms.

Users could create custom Internet radio stations based on their favorite artists, discover new music through personalized recommendations and buy DRM-free MP3 downloads directly onto their mobile device (on Android, downloads are from the Amazon MP3 application; on the iPhone and iPod Touch, downloads are from the iTunes Store.

The app also enabled people to browse and stream their personal imeem music libraries to their mobile device. People could upload up to 20,000 songs of the music they own directly to imeem.com, and then access that music through their mobile devices. To upload more than 100 songs, users had to subscribe to one of imeem's premium services.

The company introduced imeem Mobile on the Android platform in October 2008, and launched it for iPhone and iPod Touch users in May 2009. At launch, it was the only streaming music application on the Android platform, which in turn led to it being one of the most popular applications installed on Android devices. In June 2009, imeem Mobile crossed a milestone of over 1 million installs on the Android and iPhone platforms.

The application received several awards, including a 2009 Crunchie Award for Best Mobile Application, the Editor's Choice award from the blog AndroidGuys, and an award for 'Best Streaming Music App' in the 2009 Android Network Awards.

=== imeem VIP ===
In 2008, imeem launched a premium imeem VIP service that gave subscribers access to additional site features, most prominently the ability to upload more music (over 100 songs), and to watch videos up to 1080p in resolution. There were three imeem VIP subscription tiers. * The imeem "VIP" plans started at $$9.99 per year for the "VIP Lite" plan, which gave subscribers access to streaming songs through the VIP Player, and 480p video (up from 360p for basic users). The "VIP" subscription option allowed uploading of up to 1,000 songs and viewing of 720p video, for $29.99 per year. And the "VIP Plus" subscription allowed uploading of up to 20,000 songs and viewing of 1080p video, for $99.99 per year

== History ==
=== Early history: 2003–2005 ===
The imeem service has changed drastically since its original inception as a messaging application that let people communicate by online chat, blogging, instant messaging and file sharing. The service was billed as a "distributed, peer-to-peer, social network".

Founder Dalton Caldwell began working on what would become the imeem messaging application during Thanksgiving weekend in 2003. Initially, he worked on the software from his home. In 2004, imeem moved into offices in downtown Palo Alto's 285 Hamilton building, with Caldwell, Jannink and a small team of engineers continuing work on the software.

The company first unveiled its software in February 2005 at the DEMO conference and formally launched it that August.

When imeem first launched, to use the service, users were required to download and install the desktop messaging and file-sharing software; the imeem Web site merely existed as a means for users to register and download the client. Though originally designed for messaging, it was the file-sharing function that took off. The client software supported the service's distributed database model: Every imeem client on the network had a database that would generate and store references to media content shared on the network; this system would accelerate access to content deemed to be close to the user. The service's media-sharing was peer-to-peer – if a user shared photos or a podcast, then the data would only exist on the client database network; users who wanted to view the actual content would access it by peering directly with the publisher.

=== 2006 ===
In March 2006, imeem re-launched at the South by Southwest (SXSW) conference in Austin, Texas, with a new focus on enabling people to interact through the imeem.com website, using media (photos, videos, music) to express their personalities and interests. Timed to coincide with the re-launch, imeem introduced new features enabling users to upload and play music and video on the site.

In September 2006, imeem introduced embeddable Adobe Flash-based playlists that gave people the ability to take music and video playlists they created (or found) on the site and embed them virtually anywhere on the web. The company's players quickly became popular with consumers using MySpace and other social networks, giving them a way to customize and personalize their profiles with music.

As a result, imeem quickly gained traction, with the site's traffic growing to 10 million unique monthly users by the end of 2006. By March 2007, imeem's monthly traffic reached over 16 million unique monthly users.

=== 2007 ===
In February 2007, MySpace took steps to limit the posting of imeem content on its site: any updates or comments with "imeem" even mentioned in them were removed upon posting. However, MySpace stopped blocking imeem in 2008.

In March 2007, imeem announced it was partnering with SNOCAP, the digital rights and content management startup founded by Napster creator Shawn Fanning, to enable legal uploading, streaming and sharing of music on imeem, utilizing SNOCAP's content fingerprinting and digital registry technology. The goal was to provide a way for consumers to upload and share music with their friends, for free, and to do so in a way where label and artists can both make money and have greater control over where and how their music was available.

The partnership marked imeem's move to an ad-supported model, in which consumers could freely stream and share music and video content with the costs supported by advertising. Under this model, artists and labels are paid a share of the site's ad revenue in proportion to the popularity of their music on imeem, and have the right to register their content and determine whether that content is available on the site or through its embeddable widgets.

Ultimately, the imeem messaging and file-sharing application had proven to be something of a resource hog for power-users, since the database could grow to large proportions just by associating with a few individuals who were sharing a lot of content. This messaging product was ultimately phased out; the site became entirely Web-based beginning in June 2007. While this distributed model was interesting and received positive press, it proved to be difficult to attract many users since the only way to participate was to download the imeem client software. Over time, imeem integrated many of the client's features into its website and the innovative distributed database model was centralized.

Throughout the first half of 2007, imeem had negotiated with the major labels to secure licenses for this new model. Warner Music Group and imeem announced a licensing agreement for imeem's new Web-based service in July 2007, followed by Sony Music Entertainment and EMI Music in September. In December 2007, imeem signed a licensing agreement with Universal Music Group, becoming the first online music service to partner with all four major music labels to let people legally stream and share music for free online.

=== 2008 ===
On January 28, 2008, imeem announced that it was acquiring the music locker service Anywhere.FM.

On February 1, 2008, imeem acquired SNOCAP. It had already been making extensive use of SNOCAP's audio fingerprinting technology and music database. As part of the acquisition, SNOCAP's chief operating officer, Ali Aydar (ex-Napster), joined imeem.

On March 24, 2008, imeem announced the launch of a developer's platform that will permit third-party developers to interact with imeem data.

In April 2008, imeem received a new round of funding from Sequoia Capital.

In October 2008, imeem launched imeem Mobile, a free mobile music application. However, on the 22nd of that month, the company laid off 25% of its staff.

=== 2009 ===
The company's troubles continued into 2009, as Warner Music wrote off its entire $15 million investment in imeem in anticipation that no return would come of it and at the same time Warner didn't extend their licensing with Imeem.

It seemed possible the company could close in April 2009, but it was able to renegotiate deals with its major label partners, and subsequently found enough new investors to continue service. Sources told TechCrunch that imeem raised $6 million in this most recent funding round, with Morgenthaler Ventures and Warner Music Group among those investing.

The company launched imeem Mobile for the iPhone and iPod Touch in May 2009. In June 2009, imeem Mobile crossed a milestone of over 1 million installs on the Android and iPhone platforms.

On June 25, 2009, imeem announced that it was removing all user-uploaded video and photos from the site. This move, and the lack of advance notice, was unpopular with many users.

In October 2009, imeem and Google announced the integration of links to music on imeem within Google search results; imeem was one of several online music companies involved in such efforts.

== Closure ==
On December 8, 2009, MySpace (owned by News Corporation) acquired imeem, and angered many imeem users when the new parent company closed down the beleaguered service on the same day, redirecting all imeem traffic to MySpace Music. Furthermore, MySpace social network did not pay artists or labels the money still owed to them by imeem for music streaming. The controversial closure was criticized as a sign that MySpace was out of touch with the times. MySpace, on December 22, 2009, assured imeem.com users that their playlists are safe and that they are currently duplicating every user's playlist and will migrate them on to MySpace Music as soon as possible. MySpace assured that features and functionality that users were used to at imeem would soon find their way onto MySpace, and complement the existing platform alongside free full-song streaming, artist profiles, music videos, and more. MySpace will email imeem users the instructions on how to claim their playlists. On January 15, 2010, MySpace began allowing users to import imeem playlists. However, songs that are currently not available via MySpace Music were not converted over, and there was no means provided to even recover the names of the missing tracks. Additionally, user "favorites" metadata was not able to be carried over, with the result that users who depended upon their favorites lists instead of normal playlists were unable to retrieve their music. Other complaints include incorrect artist info, garbled tracks, and an increase in between-songs advertising.

== Technology ==
The back-end software for imeem's services was primarily written in C#. While most of the front-end Web servers ran under Microsoft Windows, some used the Linux operating system. The Web site heavily used Ajax programming and Flash animation.

Audio streams were delivered as 128 kbps-quality MPEG-2 Audio Layer III (MP3) format. Video was encoded in the Sorenson Video codec at >700 kbit/s, in the Flash Video (FLV) container format, with resolution resized to 400 pixels wide and preserving its aspect ratio, and with embedded mp3 audio at 96 kbit/s. The video quality and resolution was significantly better than other video sites at that time (YouTube, for example, used 300 kbit/s video). In 2008 imeem upgraded the video quality further and became one of the first media sharing sites to offer video encoded with the MPEG 4 H.264 codec and at the original source resolution.

The original imeem client software conducted most of its network activity using an encrypted protocol, making it difficult to monitor user activity. Thus, conversations via the client's IM functionality and group chats were encrypted and only visible to participants. On startup, the application validated with a central server. This ensured that unauthorized clients could not connect and run malicious exploits (such as for monitoring network traffic or spoofing identities) against the network. Software updates were also delivered via the client and authenticated before they were installed. The company's move to a Web-based file-sharing business model in 2007 made most of these considerations moot.

== Copyright infringement lawsuit ==
Warner Music Group announced on July 12, 2007, that it had dropped its copyright infringement lawsuit against imeem by agreeing to license its music and video content to the site for a percentage of imeem's advertising revenue. Financial details were not disclosed. Under the agreement, imeem could carry music and videos from all of the record company's artists. Warner also released financial statements indicating that it invested $15 million into imeem.

=== Meems (groups) ===
Users of imeem could link to each other through topic groups (which were originally called meems), based on common interests. Some meems were created by imeem itself, while others were user-generated. Media content could be placed in custom profile pages and topic groups, as well as in browseable content channels and charts. Meems could serve as basic online communities for artists, bands, clubs, films, schools, festivals, concert tours, friends, and sports enthusiasts. A late redesign of the site replaced most of the "meem" references with the familiar word "group". Early on, it had been possible for links to be made between groups which had related subject matter, but this feature had only been implemented in the original client software. After the transition to the Web-only service model, it became impossible for users to add (or even remove) such links, although official imeem-created groups sometimes had links added at creation time, by an administrative means not available to subscribers.
