= Axe Valley Academy =

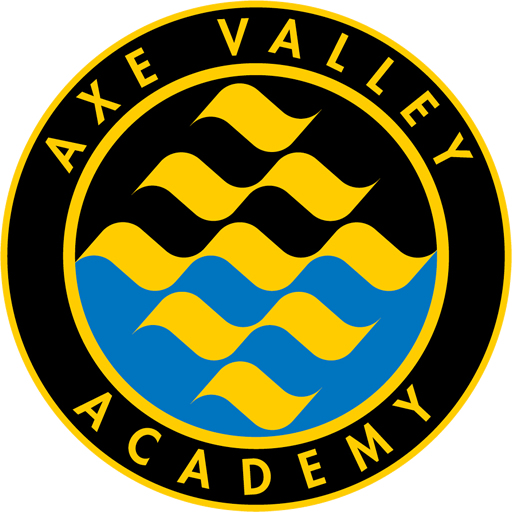

Location
- Chard Street; Axminster, Devon, EX13 5EA; England
- Coordinates: 50°47′00″N 2°59′42″W

Information
- Type: Academy
- Trust: Blackdown Education Partnership
- Department for Education URN: 144392 Tables
- Ofsted: Reports
- Chair of Governors: James Hammett
- Head teacher: Robert Crocker
- Gender: Coeducational
- Age: 11 to 16
- Enrolment: 682
- Houses: Anning, Coram, Chudleigh
- Colour
- Website: http://www.axevalley.bep.ac

Axe Valley Academy, previously known as The Axe Valley Community College, is a coeducational secondary school and sixth form located in Axminster, Devon in the South West of England. The school was awarded specialist Business and Enterprise College status in September 2004, and has provided Post 16 education since the opening of a sixth form in September 2001. The sixth form is no longer in operation as of 2017.
