= SNOCAP =

Legal music service founded by the creator of Napster

- Type: Private
- Industry: Online music
- Founded: 2002
- Fate: Acquired
- Headquarters: San Francisco, California, U.S.
- Key people: Shawn Fanning; Jordan Mendelson; Ron Conway; Ali Aydar
- Website: snocap.com

SNOCAP was a company founded by Shawn Fanning (best known for creating the Napster music service), Jordan Mendelson, and Ron Conway. Other SNOCAP employees included music lawyer Christian Castle, the company's first General Counsel, and Ali Aydar, the company's Chief Operating Officer, who joined imeem after its acquisition of SNOCAP in April 2008.

== History ==
SNOCAP was formed in 2002, during the final days of Napster's bankruptcy proceedings, but didn't launch publicly until December 2004. A significant number of its employees were people who had worked with Fanning at the original Napster; an August 2005 SNOCAP profile in Time magazine noted that "27% of SNOCAP's employees are Napster veterans."

=== SNOCAP's technology ===
SNOCAP's initial focus was on developing technology content owners (in particular artists and labels) could use to register their content; rights holders who registered their content could also set business rules controlling where and how that content is available on the web.

SNOCAP opened its digital registry in June 2005, enabling artists and labels to register their content in SNOCAP's system. Universal Music Group was the first major label to sign on to register its content in SNOCAP's digital registry. The company eventually secured deals with all four major labels to register their content in SNOCAP's database (including Universal Music Group, EMI, Warner Music Group, and SonyBMG Music Entertainment).

New York Times reporter Saul Hansell explained SNOCAP's technology in a November 2005 article:

The heart of Snocap is its sophisticated registry, which will index electronically all the files on the file-sharing networks. "Rights holders," which are what he calls musicians and their labels, will use the system to find those songs on which they hold copyrights and claim them electronically. Then they will enter into the registry the terms on which those files can be traded. It could be just like iTunes – pay 99 cents, and you own it – or it could be trickier: listen to it five times free, then buy it if you like it. Or it could be beneficent: listen to it free forever and (hopefully) buy tickets to the artist's next concert. Of course, the rights holders could also play tough: this is not for sale or for trading, and you can't have it.

SNOCAP's ultimate goal was to license this technology to file-sharing services, enabling a new wave of "legal P2P" services that used SNOCAP's technology to track and filter music sharing within a network, blocking registered content that labels & artists didn't want shared but allowing sharing of anything else. While two file-sharing services, Mashboxx and Grokster, signed up to use SNOCAP's technology, their SNOCAP-powered services never launched.

=== MySpace partnership ===
In September 2006, SNOCAP and MySpace announced that they were partnering to give independent artists and labels a way to sell music on MySpace through SNOCAP's MyStore widgets. These widgets were first marketed to unsigned artists; in March 2007, SNOCAP announced that independent labels (including Sub Pop) had also begun to use MyStore widgets to sell their music on MySpace. Eventually, over 100,000 artists signed up to sell their music through MyStore widgets.

=== imeem partnership ===
In March 2007, the social media site imeem announced a partnership with the company to track music being played on the site and share ad revenue with artists and labels, utilizing SNOCAP's content fingerprinting and digital registry technology. The goal was to provide a way for consumers to upload and share music with their friends, for free, and to do so in a way where label and artists can both make money and have greater control over where and how their music was available. imeem rolled out this new offering in June 2007.

In October 2007, SNOCAP laid off approximately 60% of its workforce. News reports at the time indicated that the company was seeking a buyer.

=== imeem acquisition ===
In February 2008, the blog TechCrunch reported that SNOCAP was being acquired by imeem. Rumors were confirmed in April 2008, when imeem announced it had acquired SNOCAP. That acquisition reunited several members of the original Napster team, including SNOCAP's then COO, Ali Aydar, Tim DeGraw, Richard Blaylock and others.

imeem continued to operate the SNOCAP digital registry, and use the technology acquired from SNOCAP to power its ad-supported music service until the imeem service itself was bought out by MySpace in December 2009.

== Funding ==
SNOCAP was backed by Ron Conway, Morgenthaler Ventures, WaldenVC, and Court Square Ventures, a Charlottesville, Virginia-based venture capital firm that provided key funding and support (and which also partnered with a local newspaper, The Hook, to promote the SNOCAP service with a downloading contest).

Coinciding with its launch in December 2004, SNOCAP announced it had raised $10 million in funding from WaldenVC and Morgenthaler Ventures.

SNOCAP announced a $15 million Series C financing in March 2006, with participation from Court Square Ventures, WaldenVC and Morgenthaler Ventures.
