= Daulton =

Daulton may refer to:

- Daulton, California
- Darren Daulton (1962–2017), American baseball player
- Daulton Varsho (born 1996), American professional baseball player
- Jack Daulton (born 1956)
- William Daulton, English MP

== See also ==
- Dalton (disambiguation)
