= Tytherleigh =

Village in Devon, England

Coordinates: 50.8257°N 2.96889°W

- Location within Devon
- OS grid reference: ST319032
- Civil parish: Chardstock
- District: East Devon
- Shire county: Devon
- Region: South West
- Country: England
- Sovereign state: United Kingdom
- Post town: AXMINSTER
- Postcode district: EX13
- Police: Devon and Cornwall
- Fire: Devon and Somerset
- Ambulance: South Western
- UK Parliament: Honiton and Sidmouth

Tytherleigh is a village in the civil parish of Chardstock in Devon, England (historically in Dorset), close to the borders with Dorset and Somerset on the A358 road between the towns of Axminster and Chard. It was in Dorset until 1896.

The place-name, first recorded in 1154 as Tiderlege, is from the Old English tīedre "thin" or "tender" and lēah "woodland", and therefore means "thin or tender woodland".

The Tytherleigh Arms public house in the village displays the Tytherleigh family coat of arms on its sign. The Tytherleigh family lived at Tytherleigh Manor for about 500 years until 1729. Part of Tytherleigh manor house survives as a farmhouse, dating from the 16th century, with a gateway arch bearing the family coat of arms.

The village is on the route of the Fosse Way Roman Road.
