= Listed buildings in Dalton, Lancashire =

Dalton is a civil parish in the West Lancashire district of Lancashire, England. It contains ten buildings that are recorded in the National Heritage List for England as designated listed buildings. Of these, one is at Grade II*, the middle grade, and the others are at Grade II, the lowest grade. The parish contains the village of Dalton, and is otherwise rural. Most of the listed buildings are farmhouses, or houses and associated structures, the others being a church, and a landmark in the form of a beacon.

== Key ==
Grade	Criteria
II*	Particularly important buildings of more than special interest
II	Buildings of national importance and special interest

== Buildings ==
Name and location	Photograph	Date	Notes	Grade
Pigeon Cote, Ashurst's Hall; 53.56727°N 2.76259°W		17th century	The pigeon cote, which was restored in 1985, is in sandstone with a stone-slate roof. It has a square plan and a pyramidal roof. In the walls are openings, some of which are narrow, and others are triangular with perches. There is a doorway on the east side, and inside there are nesting boxes in all the walls.	II
Gateway, Ashurst's Hall; 53.56756°N 2.76268°W		17th century	The gateway is in sandstone with an artificial stone tile roof. The central bay has two storeys and a round-headed moulded arch with a keystone and moulded imposts. Above the arch is a blank plaque and a mullioned window. Flanking the central bay are single-storey set-back bays, also with mullioned windows.	II
Prior's Wood Hall; 53.58079°N 2.75447°W	—	Late 17th century	The house is in sandstone with a stone-slate roof. A wing was added to the east in the 19th century. The original part has two storeys with an attic, it is in an H-shaped plan and contains mullioned windows. There is a two-storey gabled porch that has a round-headed doorway with a moulded arch and imposts, above which is a blank plaque. Inside the house is an inglenook. The 19th-century wing has three storeys, a canted bay window, and mullioned windows.	II
Belle Vue Farmhouse; 53.55803°N 2.74323°W	—	1683	A sandstone house with a stone-slate roof in two storeys. It has a two-storey gabled porch flanked by one bay on each side and a cross wing to the left. The porch has a doorway with a moulded arch and imposts, above which is a recess that formerly held an inscribed plaque. The windows are mullioned. Inside the house is an inglenook and a bressumer.	II
Barn, Lees Lane Nursery; 53.58195°N 2.76392°W	—	1710	The barn is in sandstone with a stone-slate roof, and incorporates some timber-framing. It has a linear plan, it is in a single storey, and there are outshuts to the west. The barn has doorways, ventilation slits, and an inscribed plaque.	II
Stone Hall; 53.56395°N 2.74301°W	—	Early 18th century	The house is in sandstone with a concrete tile roof. It has a symmetrical three-bay front with a plinth and a moulded cornice. The outer bays are flanked by chamfered quoins. The central bay has a pediment containing an oval attic window. The doorway is flanked by giant pilasters, and has a moulded surround and a swan-necked pediment on brackets. Above the doorway is a blank plaque. Some of the windows are mullioned and others are cross windows.	II*
Ashurst's Beacon; 53.56553°N 2.75507°W		1798	The structure is in sandstone, and consists of a square base on which is a square step and a pyramidal spire. On the south side is a blocked doorway, and on the other sides are blocked windows, all with stone surrounds and lintels with keystones.	II
Lower House Farmhouse; 53.57757°N 2.74633°W		Early to mid 19th century	A sandstone house with a roof partly of stone-slate and partly of artificial stone, in two storeys. It has two gabled cross wings, the right wing protruding forward. The windows, which are horizontal sashes, and the doorway, have plain reveals and hood moulds.	II
Ashurst's Hall; 53.56774°N 2.76271°W		19th century	A sandstone house with quoins and an artificial stone roof. It has two storeys, a main range of three bays with a cross wing on the right. The windows have plain reveals.	II
St Michael's Church; 53.56696°N 2.76368°W		1875–77	The church, by T. H. Wyatt, is in sandstone with a Welsh slate roof. It consists of a nave, transepts, a lower chancel with an apsidal east end, a south vestry, and a southwest tower. The tower has angle buttresses and a saddleback roof. At the west end are two lancet windows, and between them is a niche containing a statue of St Michael and two angels. The interior of the church was reordered after a fire in 1988.	II
