= Les Dalton =

Les Dalton means The Daltons in French.

Les Dalton may refer to:

- The Daltons (Lucky Luke), characters from the comic strip Lucky Luke
- Les Dalton (animated series), a 2010 French animation series, made by Xilam Studios
- "Les Dalton" (song), a 1967 song by Joe Dassin
- Les Dalton (film), a 2004 French film

== See also ==
- "The Daltons", a 2011 installment of the British TV programme Little Crackers
- Dalton (disambiguation)
