= Gilles Hallet =

Flemish painter

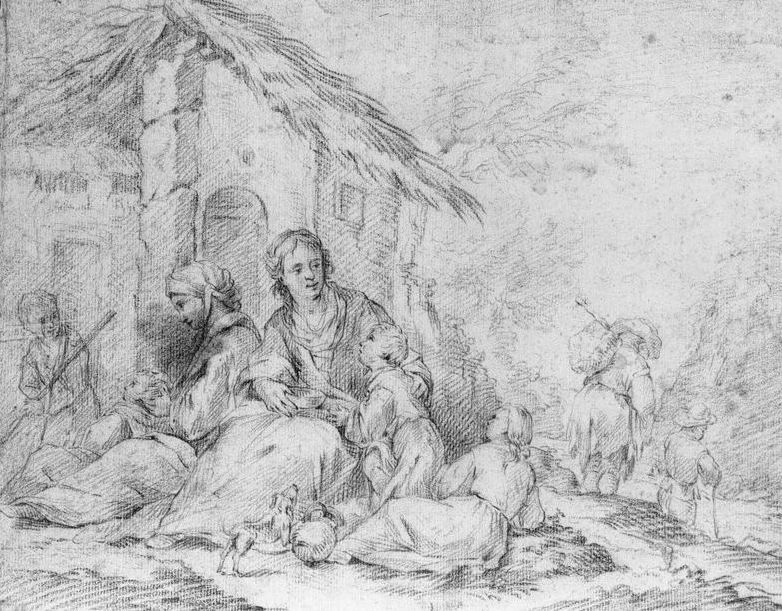
Paysannes et enfants assis devant une chaumière

Gilles Hallet (or Alé; 1635 in Liege – 1694 in Rome), a Flemish painter, worked in the latter half of the 17th century, and was distinguished for the purity of his style, according to the principles of the Roman school. According to the RKD he was the son of Jean Hallet who married the sister of Walther Damery. He studied under this uncle, along with his other uncle Jacques Damery. He travelled to Rome where he worked most of his life.

He painted in conjunction with Morandi, Bonatti, and Romanelli; and executed an altar-piece in oil, and the ceilings of the chapels in fresco, for the church of Santa Maria dell' Anima in Rome. Most of the paintings by him in Liege were destroyed when the French bombarded that town in 1691.
