= Axminster Guildhall =

Municipal building in Axminster, Devon, England

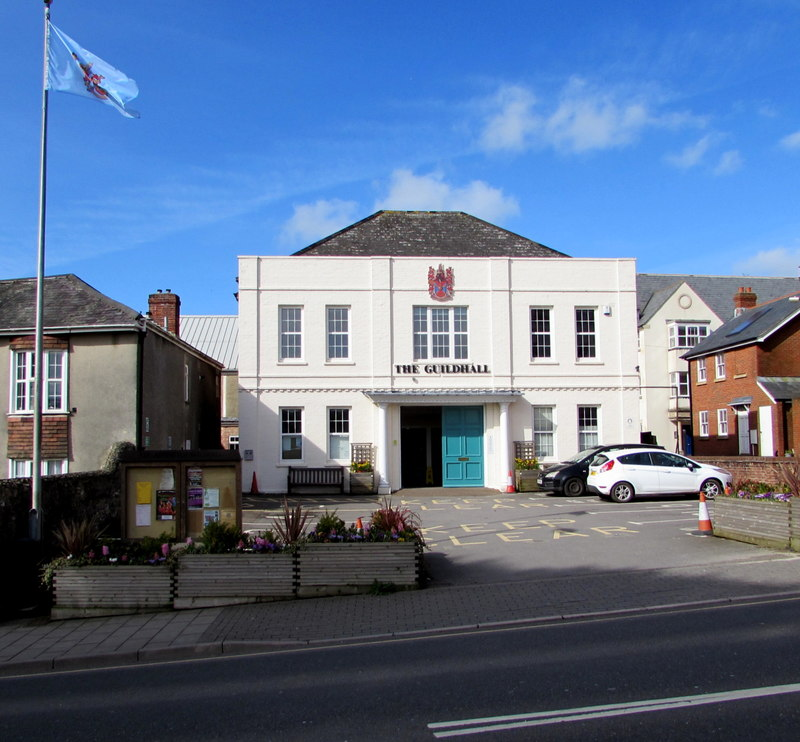
- The building in 2017

- Shown in Devon
- 50.7814°N 3.0010°W
- Location: West Street, Axminster

History
- Built: 1931

Site notes
- Architectural style: Neoclassical style

Axminster Guildhall is a municipal building in West Street in Axminster, a town in Devon, in England. The building, which is meeting place of Axminster Town Council, is also used as a community events venue.

== History ==
=== Oak House ===
Following significant population growth, largely associated with its status as a market town, an urban district council was established in Axminster in 1915. The urban district council decided to co-locate with Axminster Rural District Council at Oak House in Chard Street. The house had been commissioned by a local lawyer, Simon Bunter, in the mid-18th century. It was designed in the neoclassical style, built in red brick with stone dressings and completed in 1758. The design involved a main frontage of five bays facing onto Chard Street. The central bay featured a doorway flanked by pairs of Doric order pilasters with a fine Venetian window on the first floor. The other bays were fenestrated by sash windows.

By the late 1870s, it was being used as a school but it was later converted back for residential use, before being acquired by the two councils in 1931. It continued to be home of both councils for another two decades, and, after the urban district council was subsumed into the rural district council in 1953, remained the headquarters of the rural district council until the enlarged East Devon District Council was formed at Honiton in 1974.

=== The guildhall ===
In the mid-1920s, a group of local businessmen decided to form a company, to be known as the Axminster Guildhall Company, to finance and commission an events venue for the town. The site they selected was occupied by a private house known as The Lawn which had dated back to the mid-19th century. The new building was designed in the neoclassical style, built in brick with a stucco finish and was completed in 1931. The design involved a symmetrical main frontage of five bays facing onto West Street. The central bay featured a wide doorway flanked by two Doric order columns supporting a cornice. There was a tri-partite window on the first floor and the other bays were fenestrated by sash windows. Internally, there was a large auditorium with a balcony and a stage. It was used as a cinema from an early stage, but in 1946 it was sold to the Dorchester Cinema Company, which renamed it as the Plaza Cinema. The company that had developed the building was then wound up.

The cinema closed in 1963, and the building was converted into a performance venue. Following local government re-organisation in 1974, it was acquired by Axminster Town Council. The town council used the building to accommodate its offices but also made the building its regular meeting place. The coat of arms of the town, which had been awarded to the urban district council, was installed above the first floor window.

Although primarily a community events venue, following a refurbishment, the management team have attracted some high-profile entertainers: performers appearing at the guildhall have included the musician, Paul Young, in October 2023, the guitarist, Francis Rossi, in March 2024, and the vocalist, Tommy Blaize, in May 2024, as well as the punk rock singer, John Lydon, later in May 2024.
