= Axminster Carpets =

British carpet manufacturer

Axminster Carpets Limited
- Type: Private
- Industry: Manufacturing
- Founded: 1755 (original business)
- Founder: Thomas Whitty
- Headquarters: Axminster, England
- Area served: Worldwide
- Products: Carpets
- Number of employees: 130
- Website: axminster-carpets.co.uk

Axminster Carpets Limited is an English manufacturer of carpets, particularly the eponymous Axminster carpets. The company is based in Axminster, Devon.

== Background ==
Whilst visiting Cheapside market in London, Devon-based weaver Thomas Whitty was impressed by a large Turkish carpet that he saw. Upon his return to Axminster, he used his weaving skills to work out how to produce a product of similar quality. After several months work, he completed his first carpet on midsummer's day in 1755.

Whitty's carpets, looking much like horizontal tapestries, became the benchmark for wealthy aristocrats to have in their country homes and town houses, between 1755 and 1835. The company produced Axminster carpets for: the music room of the Royal Pavilion, Brighton; Chatsworth House; Powderham Castle; Saltram House; and Warwick Castle. King George III and Queen Charlotte purchased Axminster carpets and also visited the factory.

In 1800, the company made a 74-by-52-foot (23 m × 16 m) carpet for Mahmud II, the Sultan of the Ottoman Empire, known today as the most famous Axminster Carpet of all. Depicting a blazing sun, moon and a whole constellation of stars, it cost £1000 (equivalent to £72,421 in 2025). Carried out of the factory by thirty men from the local Congregational Church, it was initially placed in the Topkapi Palace. It was then moved to the Defterdar Palace, where it became the property of Esma Sultan, the daughter of Sultan Mustapha III.

== Decline ==
In 1828, a disastrous fire destroyed the weaving looms. In 1835, the company owner, Samuel Rampson Whitty, the founder's grandson, was declared bankrupt. Blackmores of Wilton, Wiltshire, near Salisbury, bought the remaining stock and looms and extended their business to include hand-knotted carpets, which were still called Axminsters.

In July 2012, Axminster Heritage Ltd bought the now Grade II listed former original carpet factory in which Thomas Whitty founded the company and wove the first carpets. It now houses the town's heritage centre, incorporating the town museum and the tourist information centre.

== Refoundation ==
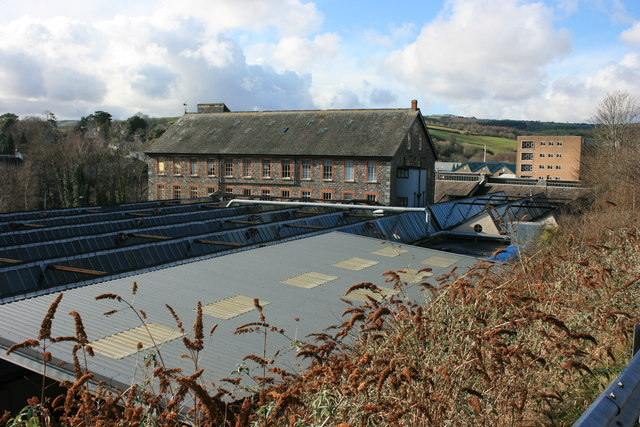
Hamlyns's Mill, Buckfastleigh, which was bought by Harry Dutfield post-World War II to overcome supply difficulties for woollen yarn

In 1929, Kidderminster-resident Scottish-born carpet manufacturer Harry Dutfield founded a new carpet company with his former schoolfriend Stephen Quayle. However, as the depression hit, the company became beset by Union problems. Setting off for the 1935 London Motor Show to buy his first Jaguar car, Dutfield met a vicar on the train from the West Country, who told him that carpets had not been made in the town of Axminster since the 1828 fire.

Returning home, Dutfield formulated a business plan to move his company to Axminster and relaunch Axminster Carpets Ltd. He persuaded the Southern Railway to extend its station at Axminster, and from 1937 lease him land on which to build a suitable factory.

At the outbreak of World War II, Dutfield converted the factory to produce stirrup pumps and later aircraft parts, while Dutfield himself was an officer in the Home Guard.

After hostilities ceased, and with severe shortages of raw materials, keen fisherman Dutfield bought a woollen mill at Buckfast, near Buckfastleigh, which came with salmon fishing rights on the River Dart. This enabled Dutfield to establish the company on its original basis, being the complete "from fleece to floor" carpet maker.

After handing over day-to-day running of the company to his son Simon, Dutfield semi-retired from the company to pursue his hobby of fishing. Awarded an MBE for his services to British exports, Dutfield died at his home in Axminster on 21 May 1999.

== Present ==
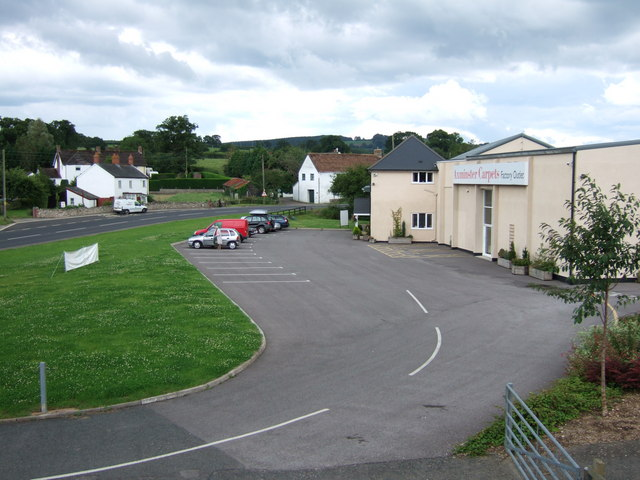
The factory outlet for Axminster Carpets Limited in Axminster, Devon

Today, Axminster Carpets is the only manufacturer to purchase, wash, card, spin and dye its own yarn before weaving the carpet itself.

To celebrate 250 years of carpet weaving in Axminster, in 2005 a commemorative rug was produced. Paraded by the company's weavers through the town, it was then blessed by the Bishop of Exeter and presented to the Earl of Devon. The carpet is now in Clarence House, the then-home of King Charles III. Also in 2012, Axminster was awarded a Royal Warrant for the supply of goods and services to the Royal Household.

The modern Axminster-type power loom is capable of weaving high quality carpets with many varying colours and patterns, and is manufactured all over the world. Due to their hard-wearing and durable nature, Axminster carpets are most frequently used in country homes, luxury hotels, global airlines and train carriages. Every Wetherspoon pub has a bespoke designed carpet manufactured by Axminster.

On 19 February 2020, it was announced that the company had gone into administration. However, it was bought out of administration in March 2020 by a group of investors, including the former owners.
