= Chardstock =

Village in Devon, England

Coordinates: 50°50′06″N 2°58′49″W

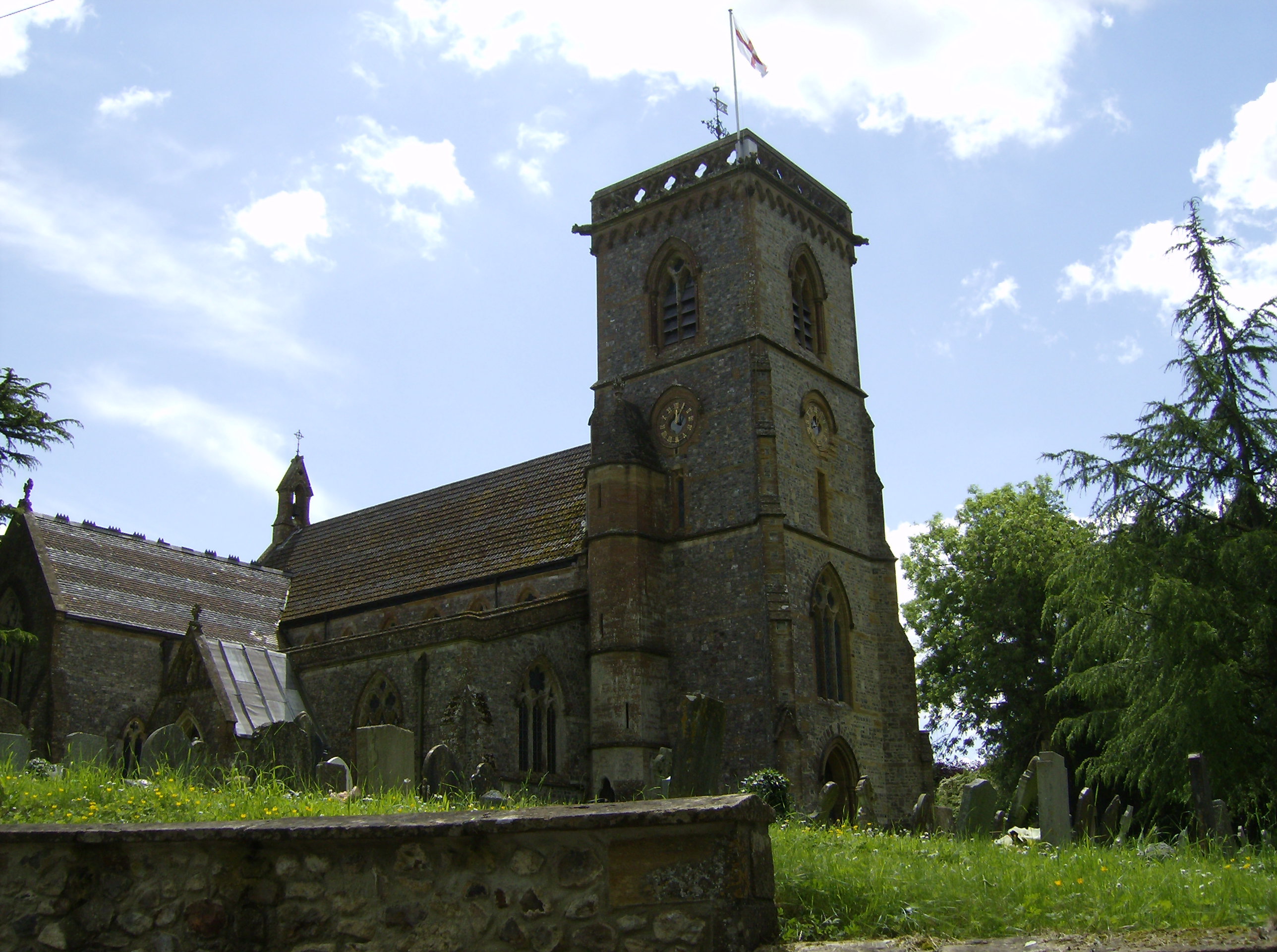
- Chardstock Church

- Location within Devon
- Population: 828
- OS grid reference: ST309045
- Civil parish: Chardstock
- District: East Devon
- Shire county: Devon
- Region: South West
- Country: England
- Sovereign state: United Kingdom
- Post town: Axminster
- Postcode district: EX13
- Dialling code: 01460
- Police: Devon and Cornwall
- Fire: Devon and Somerset
- Ambulance: South Western
- UK Parliament: Honiton and Sidmouth

Chardstock is a village and civil parish located on the eastern border of Devon, England off the A358 road between Chard and Axminster. The parish population at the 2011 Census was 828. The parish also contains the hamlets of Bewley Down, Birchill, Burridge, Holy City and Tytherleigh.

The parish is a major part of the electoral ward of Yarty. The ward population at the above census was 2,361.

The parish was in Dorset until 1896. Historically it formed part of Beaminster Forum and Redhone Hundred.

The attractive village is surrounded by farmland and woodland and is within the Blackdown Hills Area of Outstanding Natural Beauty. The River Kit runs through the village. The village church dates from the 13th Century and rebuilt in the 19th Century by Canon Woodcock. The village also has a post office and pub (currently closed).

The collection of work by Artist Kenneth Butler Evans, cousin of poet William Butler Yeats, is based in the village at the home of his widow, sculptor Ann Ford.

== Prebend ==
During the Middle Ages, Chardstock was a prebend of the Cathedral church of Salisbury.

== Buildings ==
- The George Inn, Chardstock

== Freedom of the Parish ==
The following people and military units have received the Freedom of the Parish of Chardstock.

=== Individuals ===
- 12 June 2019: Michael Dadds, Former Chardstock Parish Councillor.
