= The George Inn, Chardstock =

Pub in Chardstock, Devon, England

Coordinates: 50°50′08″N 2°58′53″W

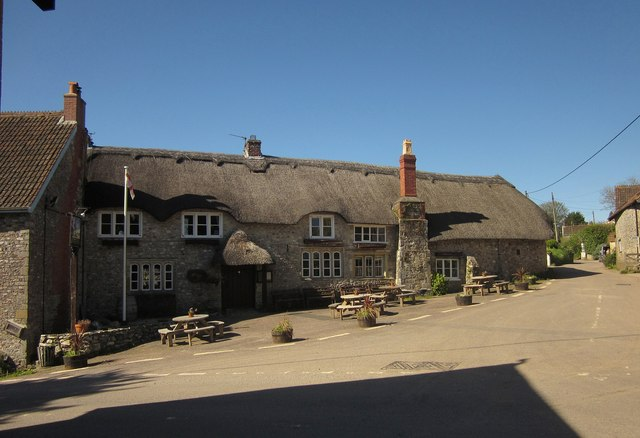
The George Inn in 2013.

The George Inn is a grade II* listed building in the village of Chardstock, England.

== History ==
The inn has been originally been a church or parish house dating back to the 15th century. In 1967 it was made a listed building.

The George Inn in Chardstock was closed permanently during the COVID-19 pandemic. Residents formed the George Inn Continuity Group after Chardstock Parish Council recognised it as an asset of community value. They called on Historic England and East Devon District Council to intervene to save the "at risk" building. The campaign was supported by local Member of Parliament Simon Jupp. The inn is reportedly in poor condition.
