= Walther Damery =

Walther Damery (1610, Liège – after 1672, Liège), was a Southern Netherlandish Baroque painter.

== Biography ==
According to Houbraken he was known along with Leonard van Orley for emblems in the manner of Jacob Cats.

According to the RKD he was the teacher of his younger brother Jacques Damery and Gilles Hallet. He travelled to England in 1639 and the next year he left for Italy and on the way back in 1643 he was captured by pirates and taken to Algiers. He escaped and in 1644 made an altarpiece for the Cathedral of the southern French town Toulon. He then travelled north and stayed in Paris until 1646 before returning to Liege, where he took on pupils. He is known for portraits and religious works, of which one is dated 1672.

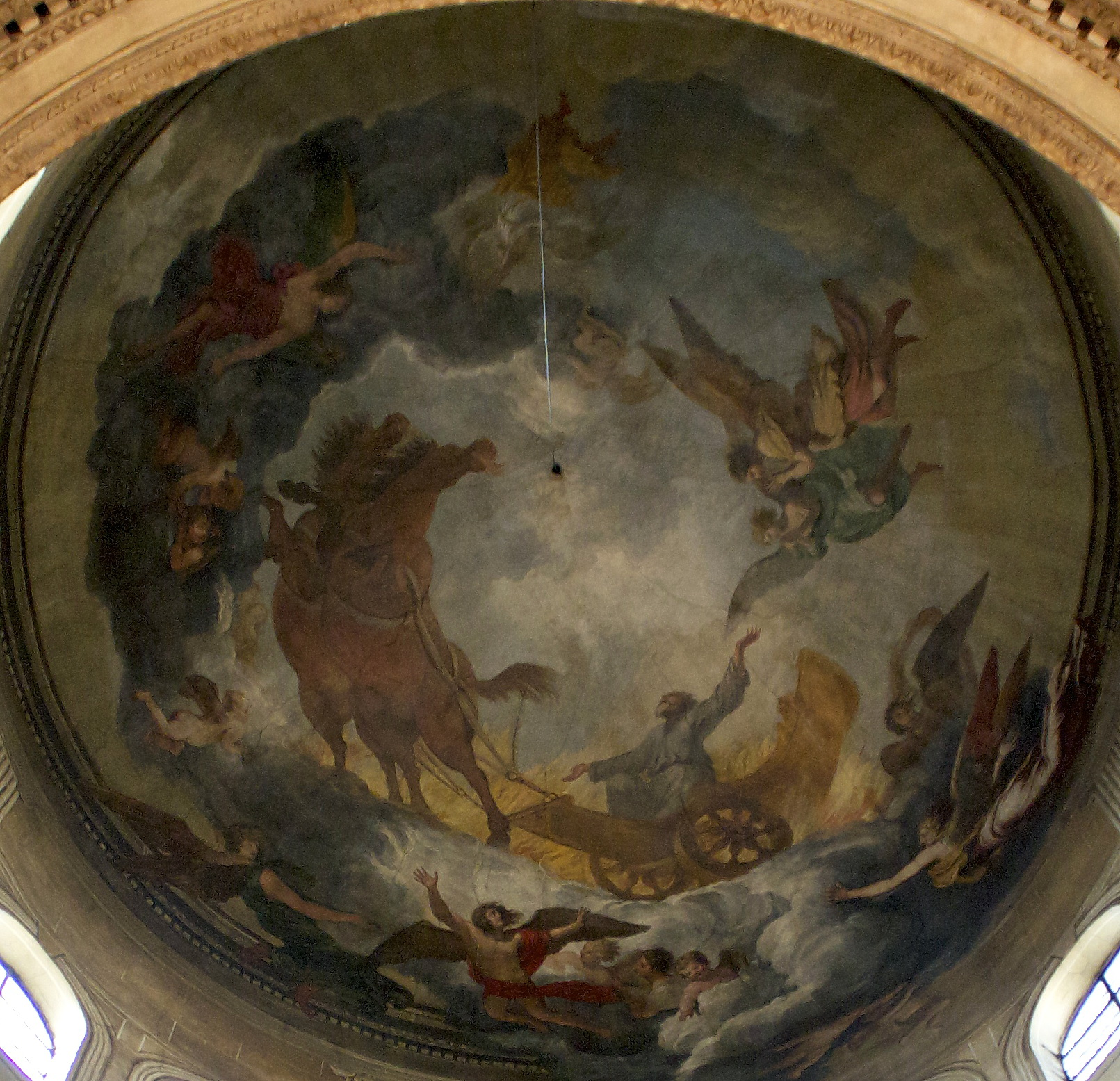
Cupola Carmel Church, Paris

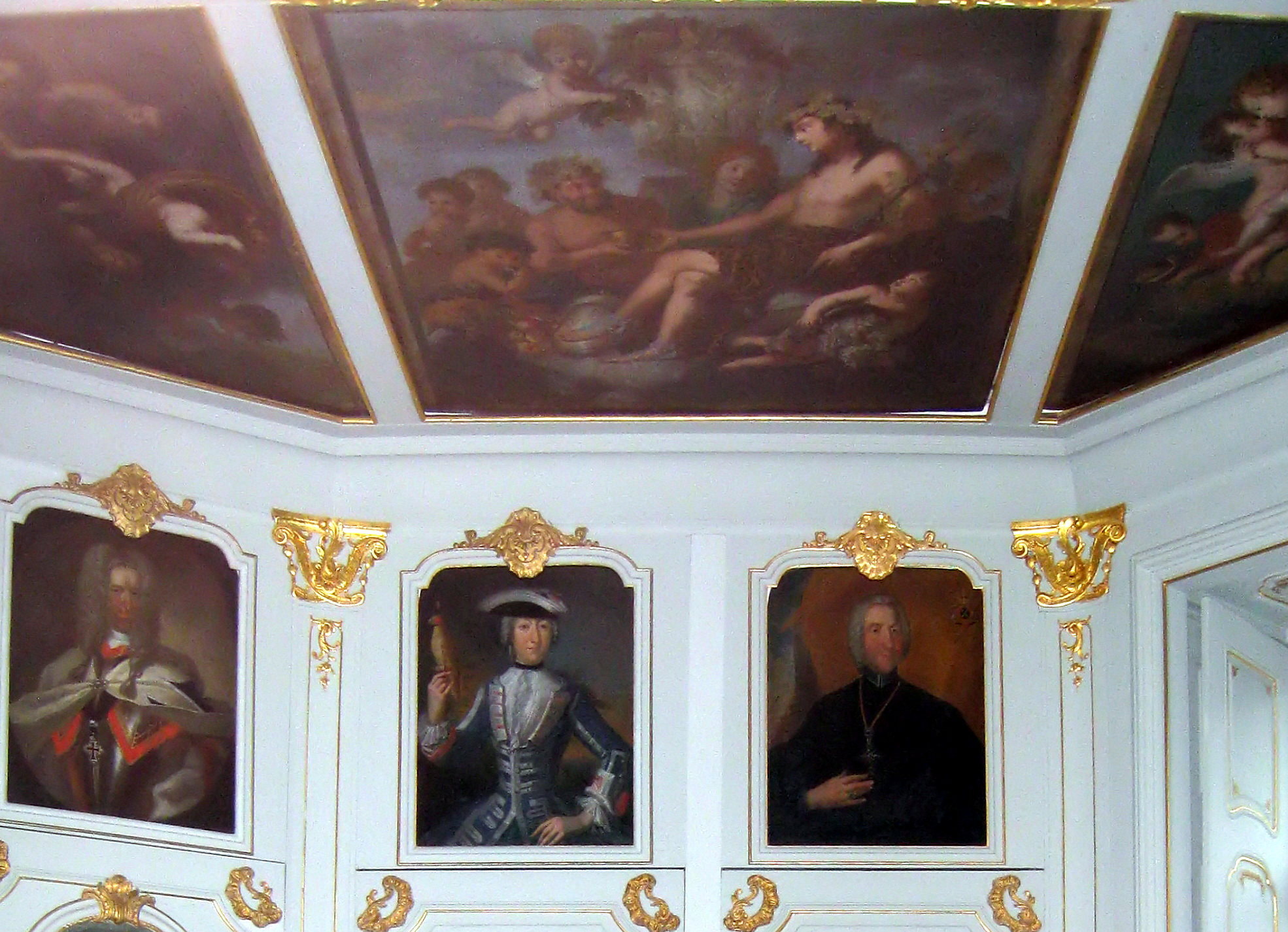
Library Alden Biesen Castle

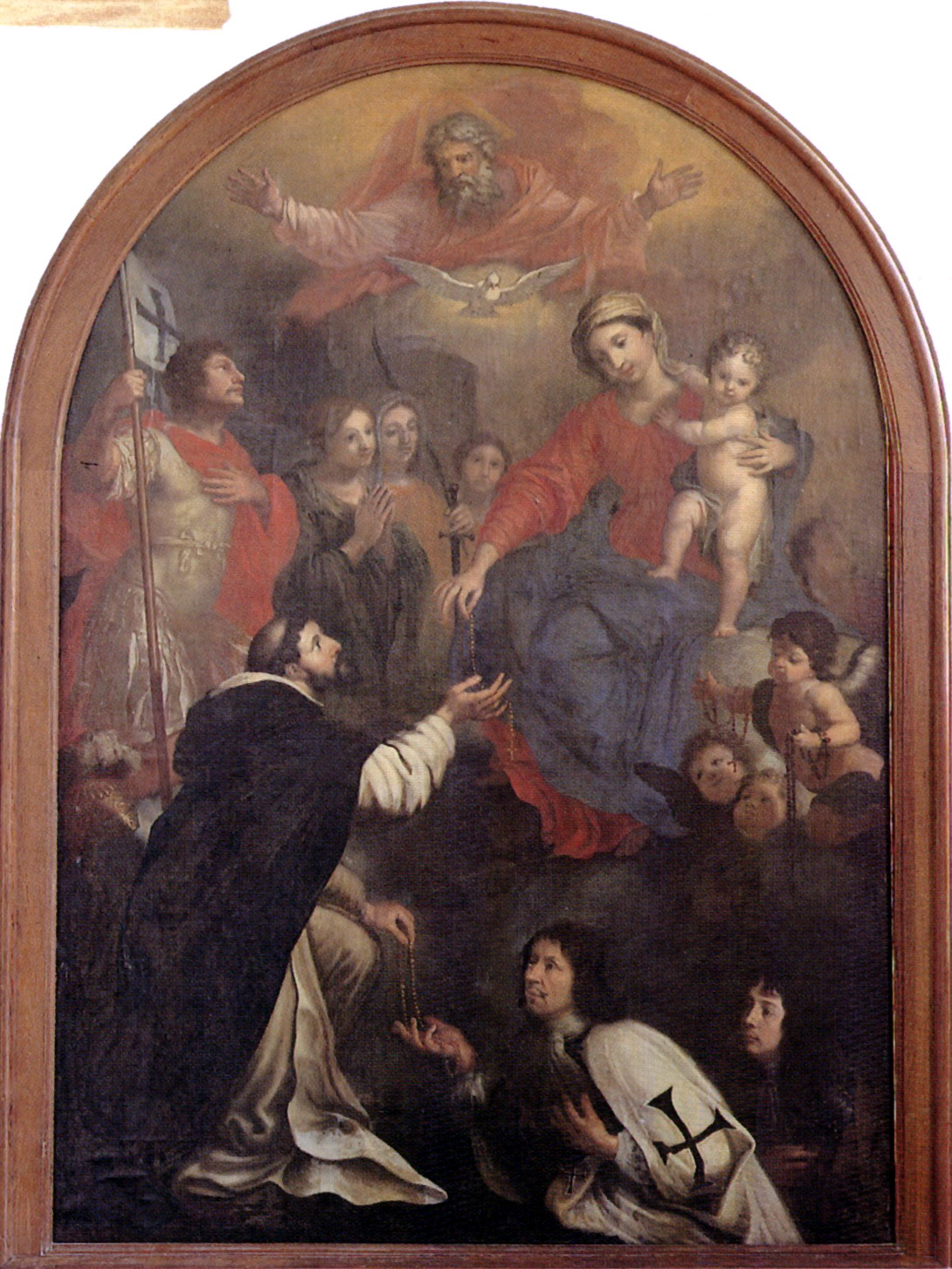
Virgin and Saint Dominic, Alden Biesen Castle

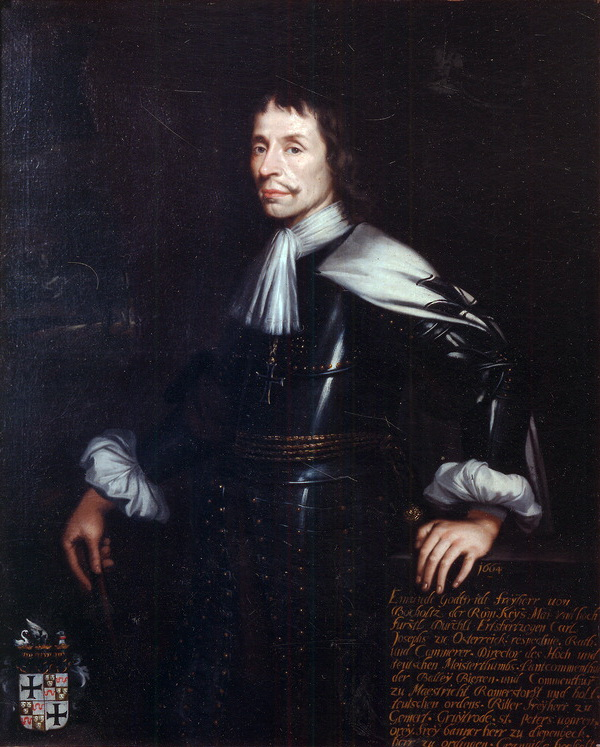
Edmund Von Bocholtz, RMFAB, Brussels
