= Dalton Hall =

Dalton Hall might refer to:

== Places ==
- Dalton Hall, Cumbria, England
- Dalton Hall, East Riding of Yorkshire, Dalton Holme, England
- Dalton Hall, North Yorkshire, England
- Dalton-Ellis Hall, residence hall at the University of Manchester, Greater Manchester, England, formerly known as Dalton Hall

== People ==
- H. Dalton Hall (1881–1946), South Australian marine artist
