= Dalton Caldwell =

American businessman

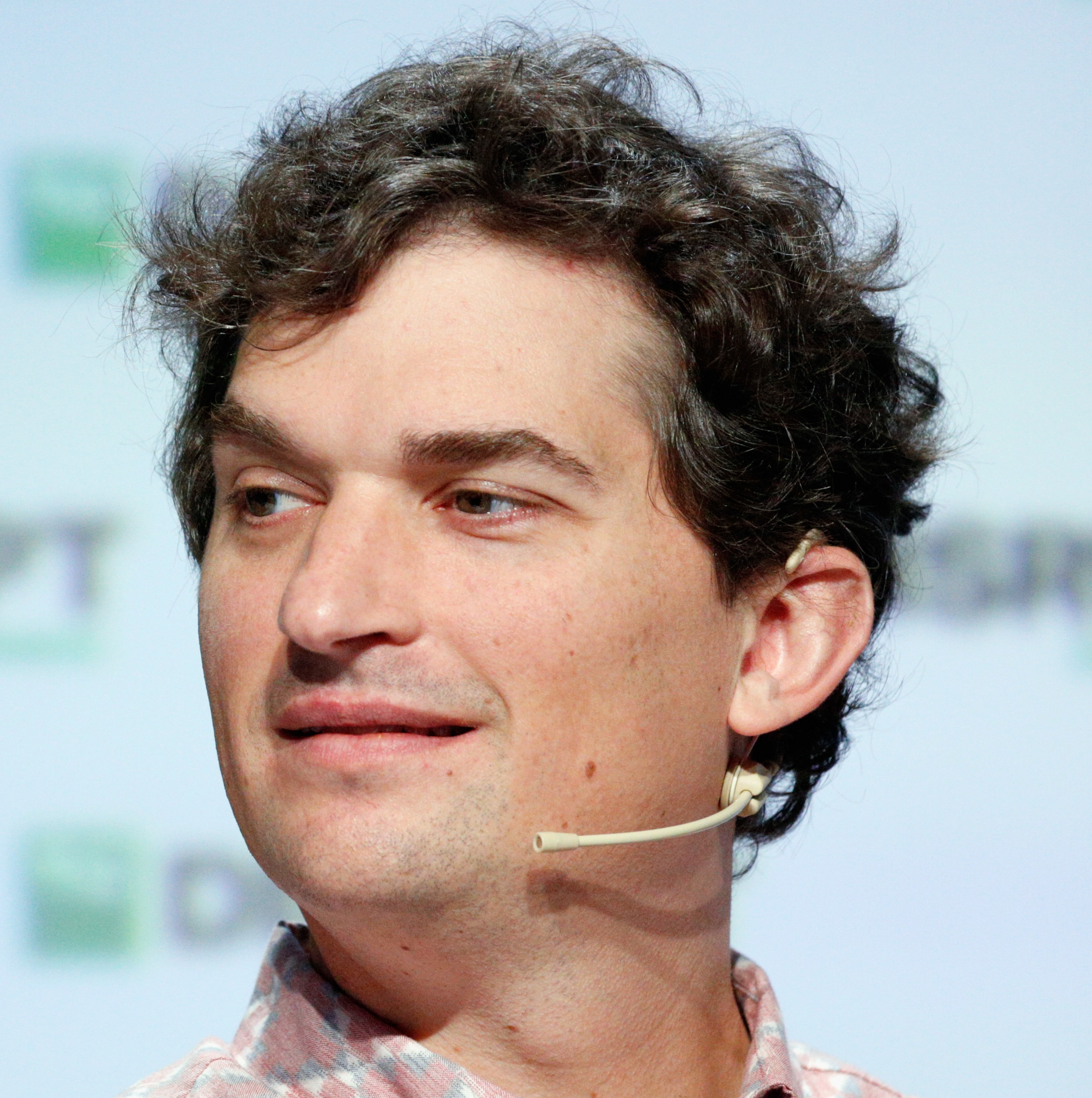
- Born: February 27, 1980 (age 46); El Paso, Texas, US
- Occupations: Managing director and partner, Y Combinator
- Known for: Founder of imeem

Dalton Caldwell (born February 27, 1980) is an American technologist and digital music entrepreneur. He is the founder and chief executive officer of imeem. He currently works as a partner at Y Combinator.

== Biography ==
Caldwell was born in El Paso, Texas, and graduated from Stanford University in 2003 with a B.S. in symbolic systems and a B.A. in psychology.

After graduation, Caldwell worked briefly for VA Linux (where he had previously worked as a summer intern) before founding Imeem in late 2003 with Stanford classmate (and ex-Napster engineer) Jan Jannink. Imeem was eventually bought by MySpace.

Caldwell founded Mixed Media Labs in 2010. Its first product was picplz, a photo broadcasting application for phones.

In October 2010, Caldwell spoke at Y Combinator’s Startup School event at Stanford University about the failures of Imeem and of the challenges still facing the music industry.

Caldwell started App.net, through Mixed Media Labs, as a social network similar to Twitter, but with no advertising, instead relying on user and developer subscriptions.

On May 6, 2014, Caldwell announced the service has not seen sufficient subscriptions to support any full-time employees and that it would remain online but without plans for enhancements or improvements.
