= Broxhill =

Hamlet in Dorset, England

Coordinates: 50.914°N 1.867°W

Broxhill, Bull Hill and Daggons
- Location within Dorset
- Unitary authority: Dorset
- Ceremonial county: Dorset
- Region: South West
- Country: England
- Sovereign state: United Kingdom
- Post town: FORDINGBRIDGE
- Postcode district: SP6
- Dialling code: 01590
- Police: Dorset
- Fire: Dorset and Wiltshire
- Ambulance: South Western
- UK Parliament: North Dorset

Bull Hill, Dorset, Daggons and Broxhill are adjoining hamlets (mainly of Alderholt village) notable for planted woodland and tree cultivation south of Cranborne Chase and West Wiltshire Downs AONB in Dorset, England. The nearest town is Fordingbridge, about 3 miles (4.8 km) ENE. They are primarily in the civil parish of Alderholt, though some of Bull Hill is in the parishes (secular and ecclesiastic) of Damerham in a north-west projection of Hampshire. The three places have indistinct borders as is normal for hamlets.

== Demography ==
Sparesly populated, consisting demographically of almost exclusively farmhouses, roadside lines of set back cottages and smallholdings both places have many sources of and one main headwater stream of the Allen draining east.

== Notable land use ==
A large Christmas tree farm is a notable land use south of the Cranborne-Fordingbridge road after running east–west through Daggons. A similarly aligned long chord meets with the high-country road The Moor running briefly to the north which forks into roads heading north-east and north-west importantly named Broxhill, lending to the remembrance of the former farmstead in modern maps and publications. Before reaching Daggons from Alderholt's centre to the north, and north of the mentioned chord road ('Broxhill') is dense, plantation woodland as to at least one of these two kilometres intermittently, where so to a buffer depth of between 300 and 950 metres.

== Local government ==
In the first (top) tier of local government, all three places since 2019 fall into the new Cranborne & Alderholt ward. In the third tier they fall into Alderholt Civil Parish, which has the right of expressions of opinion in planning matters and directly controls the precepts to cover footpaths, sports facilities, occasional streetscene projects, events and certain elements of community hall facilities.
