= Dalreavoch =

Coordinates: 58.04915°N 4.11536°W

Dalreavoch: Scottish Gaelic: An Dail Riabhach
- Location within the Sutherland area
- OS grid reference: NC752086
- Council area: Highland
- Lieutenancy area: Sutherland
- Country: Scotland
- Sovereign state: United Kingdom
- Postcode district: IV28 3
- Police: Scotland
- Fire: Scottish
- Ambulance: Scottish

Dalreavoch (Scottish Gaelic: An Dail Riabhach) is a small crofting hamlet in Rogart in Sutherland, Scottish Highlands and is in the Scottish council area of Highland.

The River Brora which rises in Ben Armine, east of Loch Shin, passes Dalreavoch.
