= Dalton High School =

Dalton High School may refer to:

- Dalton High School (Georgia)
- Dalton High School (Nebraska), a defunct high school in Dalton, Nebraska
- Dalton High School (Ohio)
- Dalton School, a private school in New York City
- Leyton High School, a high school in Dalton, Nebraska
- Wahconah Regional High School, a high school in Dalton, Massachusetts
