= Dalchalm =

Coordinates: 58.02771°N 3.85024°W

- Location within the Sutherland area
- OS grid reference: NC908057
- Council area: Highland
- Lieutenancy area: Sutherland
- Country: Scotland
- Sovereign state: United Kingdom
- Post town: Brora
- Postcode district: KW9 6
- Police: Scotland
- Fire: Scottish
- Ambulance: Scottish

Dalchalm is a small village, slightly north of Brora, on the east coast of Sutherland, Scottish Highlands and is in the Scottish council area of Highland.

The main road artery of the A9 has bypassed Dalchalm.
