= Loughwood Meeting House =

Church in Devon, England

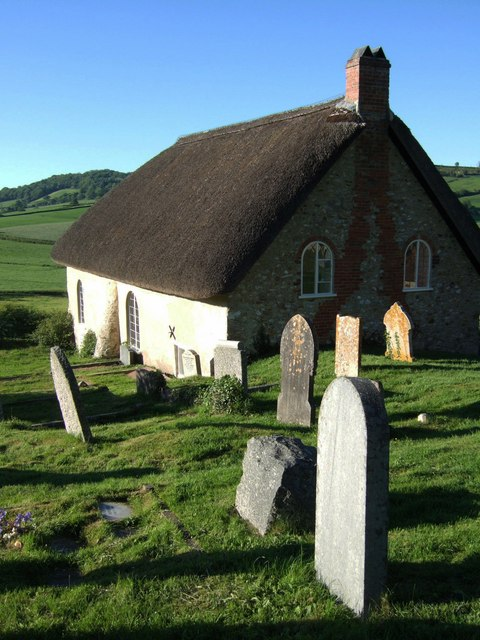
- Loughwood Meeting House

- Location within Devon and the United Kingdom

Religion
- Affiliation: Baptist

Location
- Location: Dalwood, Devon
- Interactive map of Loughwood Meeting House
- Coordinates: 50.7883°N 3.0610°W

Architecture
- Type: Chapel
- Groundbreaking: 1653

Loughwood Meeting House is a historic Baptist chapel, 1 mile (1.6 km) south of the village of Dalwood, Devon in England. There was a meeting house on this site in 1653, although the current building may date from the late 17th century or early 18th century. It is one of the earliest surviving Baptist meeting houses. Since 1969 it has been owned by the National Trust. English Heritage have designated it a Grade II* listed building.

== Origins ==
The meeting house was founded by the Baptists of Kilmington, Devon, a village 1 mile (1.6 km) away to the southeast. Prior to the Act of Toleration 1689, the meeting house was illegal, but its location made it suitable as a refuge. It was built into a hillside, at that time surrounded by woodland and accessible only by narrow paths. Furthermore, it lay within a detached outlier of the county of Dorset, as the parish of Dalwood belonged to Dorset until 1842. From the outside it resembled a farm-worker's cottage apart from the gravestones surrounding it. It is still used for worship twice a year by the congregation of nearby Kilmington Baptist Church.

== Architecture ==
The building is of stone rubble with buttresses and a thatched roof. The interior dates from the mid 18th century to early 19th century. The interior is set up as a preacher's house with a high pulpit at the centre front. On the left are box pews at right angles to the wall, and on the right some are square pews and the others are parallel with the wall. The musicians sat in the front pews of the gallery where they had their music rests. A notch in the floor was used for the foot of the bass viol. Two small rooms at the back of the meeting house were used for cooking the midday meal when the congregation met on Sundays for the entire day. Outside is the graveyard, the first interment being in 1659, and in the corner of the graveyard is a stable for the horses of those members who had come from far afield. There was also a baptismal pool.

== Membership ==
The earliest records go back to 1653, but the church had been in existence for some time before that. Two of the earliest members were John Vernon and William Allen who had been part of the victorious Parliamentary forces under General Fairfax in the English Civil War in 1645. Other early members had escaped from France, mostly being Huguenots, and because their names were difficult to pronounce, were known as "French". This remains a common surname among church members and in the vicinity.
