= Dalwood =

Village in Devon, England

Coordinates: 50.799068°N 3.066492°W

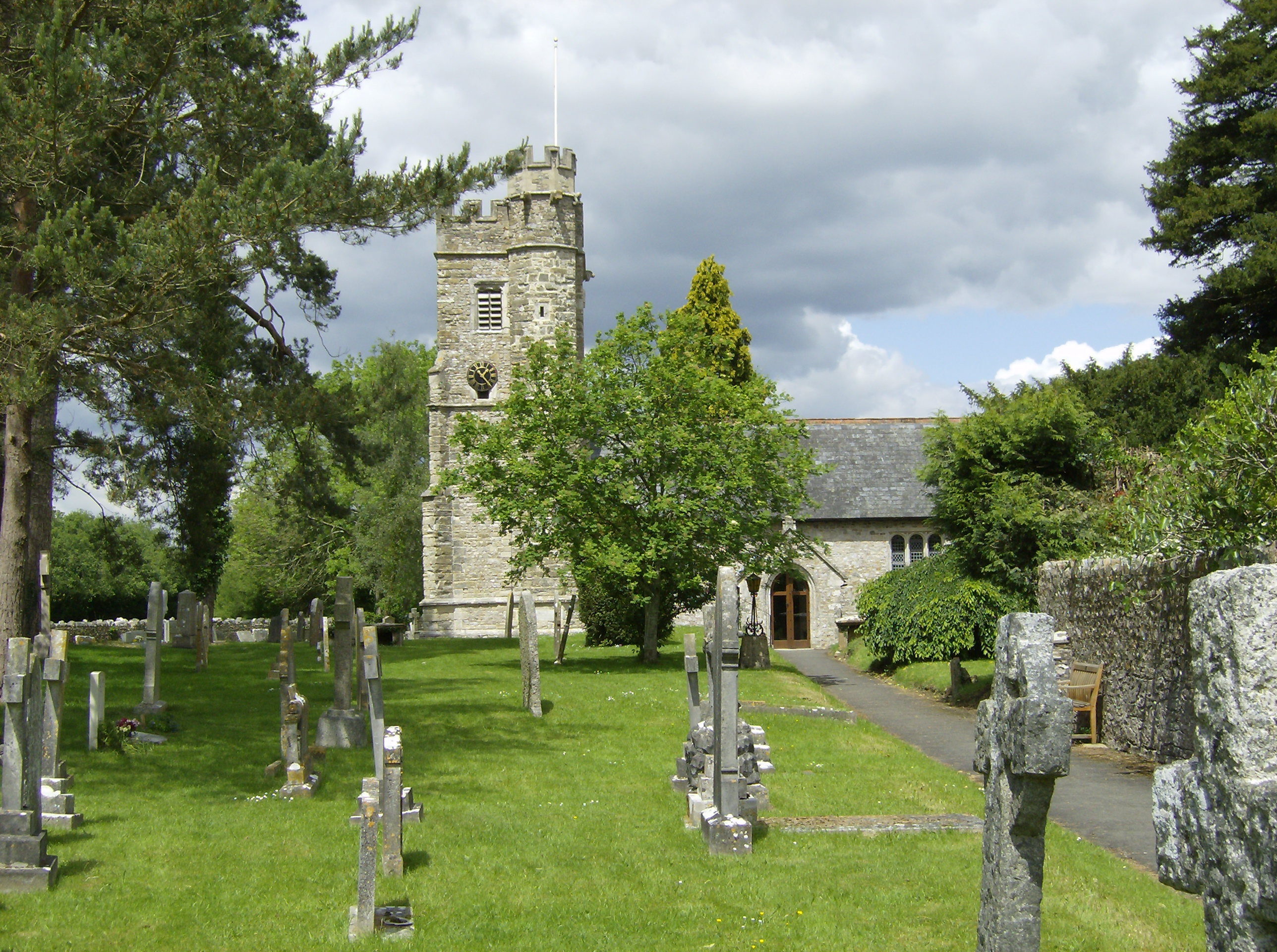
- Dalwood Church

- Location within Devon
- OS grid reference: ST248005
- Shire county: Devon
- Region: South West
- Country: England
- Sovereign state: United Kingdom
- Post town: Axminster
- Postcode district: EX13
- Dialling code: 01404
- Police: Devon and Cornwall
- Fire: Devon and Somerset
- Ambulance: South Western
- UK Parliament: Honiton and Sidmouth

Dalwood is a village and county parish in the East Devon district of the English county Devon. It is approximately 3 miles (4.8 km) away from the nearest town, Axminster, and 5 miles (8.0 km) away from Honiton. Dalwood can be accessed by the nearby A35 road. The village is placed within the Blackdown Hills Area of Outstanding Natural Beauty. Along with the nearby village of Stockland, until 1842 the village was a part of an outlier of the county Dorset.

Dalwood is a small village with a church, primary school, village hall and public house.

St Peter's church is 15th-century and was restored in 1881. It has some early stained glass windows. Immediately to the right of the main door (and partly visible in photograph) is the grave of Pedro de Alcantara Travassos Valdez, a son of the Portuguese soldier and Prime Minister José Lucio Travassos Valdez, 1st Count of Bonfim.

Nearby Loughwood Meeting House just north of the A35 road is an 18th-century Baptist chapel with an unaltered interior. Some landscaped gardens are opened to the public at nearby Burrow Farm.

Situated in the centre of the village is The Tuckers' Arms, a 12th-century thatched freehouse inn with original inglenook fireplace and flagstone floors.

In 2009, Dalwood Vineyard was established on nearby Danes Hill, overlooking the village. The first crop was produced in 2013 and used to make an English sparkling wine.
