= Dalton Airport (Michigan) =

Airport in Genesee County, Michigan, United States

- IATA: none; ICAO: none; FAA LID: 3DA

Summary
- Airport type: Public
- Owner: Dalton Airport Association
- Serves: Flushing, Michigan
- Elevation AMSL: 733 ft (223 m)
- Coordinates: 43°03′09″N 083°48′18″W
- Interactive map of Dalton Airport

Runways
Direction	Length		Surface
Direction	ft	m	Surface
18/36	2,510	765	Asphalt
9/27	1,633	498	Turf

Statistics (2019)
- Aircraft operations: 6,968
- Based aircraft: 74
- Source: Federal Aviation Administration

Dalton Airport (FAA LID: 3DA) is a privately owned, public use airport located two nautical miles (4 km) east of the central business district of Flushing, in Genesee County, Michigan, United States. It is named after its founder, Edwin P. Dalton, who opened it in 1946 on the former site of the Marsa farm.

== Events ==
The airport is home to a chapter of the Experimental Aircraft Association. The chapter hosts of a variety of events for members and the community.

The airport is home to a variety of aircraft exhibitions, fly-ins, and more. The airport is home to an annual event, for example, that shows off experimental aircraft, old warbird aircraft, RC aircraft, helicopters, and other vintage aircraft.

The Michigan Ultralight Flying Club also hosts events for ultralight pilots and others interested.

== Facilities and aircraft ==
Dalton Airport covers an area of 88 acres (36 ha) at an elevation of 733 feet (223 m) above mean sea level. It has two runways: 18/36 is 2,510 by 50 feet (765 x 15 m) with an asphalt surface; 9/27 is 1,633 by 130 feet (498 x 40 m) with a turf surface. Runway 9/27 is closed from October through March.

For the 12-month period ending December 31, 2019, the airport had 6,968 aircraft operations, an average of 134 per week, entirely general aviation. This is down from 13,328 aircraft operations in 2010. In 2019, there were 74 aircraft based at this airport: 74 single-engine airplanes, 2 ultralights, and 1 helicopter.

== Accidents and incidents ==
- On July 28, 2002, a Cessna R172K sustained substantial damage when it impacted a curb after an aborted takeoff following a reported loss of engine power during takeoff from the Dalton Airport. In a written report, the pilot stated, "just after becoming airborne no increase in airspeed was noted and [the] aircraft felt heavy - airspeed started to decrease in level flight approx[imately] 15 [feet] AGL. Decision to abort [takeoff] was made and [aircraft] was flown to runway - power off - upon contact - brakes were applied full for over 800 [feet]." The airplane subsequently slid off the end of the runway, across an adjacent road, and impacted into the curb on the opposite side of the road. The nose landing gear of the airplane collapsed. The pilot stated that the runway was wet from a previous rain. The probable cause was found to be a loss of engine power for undetermined reasons.
- On April 24, 2004, an Aeronca 7AV sustained substantial damage during an in-flight collision with runway 09 while landing at the Dalton Airport. The probable pause was found to be the pilot's failure to maintain airspeed while on final approach, resulting in an inadvertent stall at a low altitude.
- On October 29, 2005, a Colson/Goodbread Rans S-12 crashed at Dalton Airport due to a loss of engine power on initial climb for undetermined reasons. A factor was the tree the airplane impacted during the forced landing.
- On May 25, 2006 a Maule MT-7-235 sustained substantial damage during landing roll at the Dalton Airport. The pilot reported that the landing was normal until about 150 feet into the landing rollout. The pilot reported that the small castoring wheels on the amphibian floats sank into the soft ground and "caused our plane to pole-vault onto its tail." The pilot reported that the inspection of the runway revealed that there was about 3/4 inch of standing water on the runway. The probable cause of the accident was found to be the pilot's selection of unsuitable terrain for landing, which resulted in the collapse of the amphibian float's nose wheels, and a nose over during the landing roll.
- On July 15, 2008, an experimental Drochak Aventura II amphibian airplane was destroyed when it impacted trees and terrain after a loss of engine power during takeoff climb from Dalton Airport. As corroborated by others, a witness reported that he saw the airplane heading westbound from the airport at about 100 feet above ground level (agl), and then it entered a left turn to the south. The airplane made another left bank, and then it made a sudden nose dive into the ground. The probable cause of the accident was found to be a loss of engine power for undetermined reasons.
- On July 31, 2009, a Taylorcraft BC12-65 was damaged during a hard landing at Dalton. The pilot stated that he used a forward slip to lose altitude on final. He said that he was a "little slow" when he came out of the slip. He reported that the landing was a hard landing, the right main landing gear contacted first, and then the gear folded under the airplane. The probable cause of the accident was found to be the pilot's failure to maintain adequate descent rate and airspeed on final resulting in a hard landing.
- On July 17, 2013, a Taylorcraft BC12-65 impacted a wooded area while approaching to land at the Dalton Airport. The probable cause of the crash was found to be the student pilot’s failure to maintain airspeed during the landing approach, which led to a stall/spin, and the flight instructor’s failure to monitor the approach and provide remedial action before the stall.
- On July 22, 2014, an Aeronca 11AC crashed while taking off from Dalton. During the takeoff roll, before the tail became airborne, the airplane suddenly entered a right swerve that the pilot was unable to correct for with normal flight control and brake inputs. The flight instructor aboard reduced engine power as the airplane departed the right side of the runway. The airplane subsequently collided with a hangar structure located alongside the runway.
- On March 24, 2015, a Cessna 150 crashed after takeoff from Dalton due to fuel contamination. During a preflight examination, the pilot identified fuel contamination, from water, in his airplane's fuel tanks. He removed approximately one quart of water each from the right wing, left wing, belly drain and engine strainer. He thought he removed all the water from the fuel system and started the engine. He performed an engine run up at twenty-two hundred revolutions per minute. After a five minute engine run, the pilot decided the airplane was suitable for flight and initiated a takeoff. Upon reaching an altitude of four hundred feet, the engine lost power. The pilot entered an emergency descent and forced landing, subsequently impacting several trees and eventually the terrain.
- On June 25, 2016, a Cessna 172 collided with a deer while landing at Dalton at night, resulting in substantial damage to the horizontal stabilizer and elevator of the airplane.
- On March 28, 2017, a Grumman American AA-5 overran the runway at Dalton and impacted trees at the end of the runway. The pilot reported that, during the landing he was "going to[sic] fast," over ran the runway, and impacted trees. The probable cause of the accident was found to be the pilot’s unstabilized approach and subsequent failure to attain the proper touchdown point, which resulted in a runway overrun.

== See also ==
- List of airports in Michigan
