= Thomas Whitty =

Thomas Whitty (1713–1792) was an English carpet manufacturer who founded Axminster Carpets in 1755.

Whitty was impressed by a large Turkish carpet he saw at Cheapside Market in London, and upon his return to Axminster he used his skills as a weaver to work out how to produce a product of similar quality. After several months work he completed his first carpet on midsummer's day 1755. His carpets were then chosen by wealthy aristocrats to have in their English country homes and town houses. Axminster Carpets were produced for the music room of the Brighton Royal Pavilion, Saltram House, Warwick Castle, Chatsworth House and in 1800 for the Sultan of Turkey.

King George III and Queen Charlotte purchased Axminster carpets and also visited the factory which dominated the English carpet market between 1755 and 1835 when Samuel Ramson Whitty, the grandson of the founder was declared bankrupt following a disastrous fire seven years earlier which destroyed the weaving looms.

Blackmores of Wilton, near Salisbury, bought the remaining stock and looms and extended their business to include hand-knotted carpets which were still called Axminsters.
