= Dalton, Lancashire =

Village in Lancashire, England

Coordinates: 53.567°N 2.763°W

Dalton
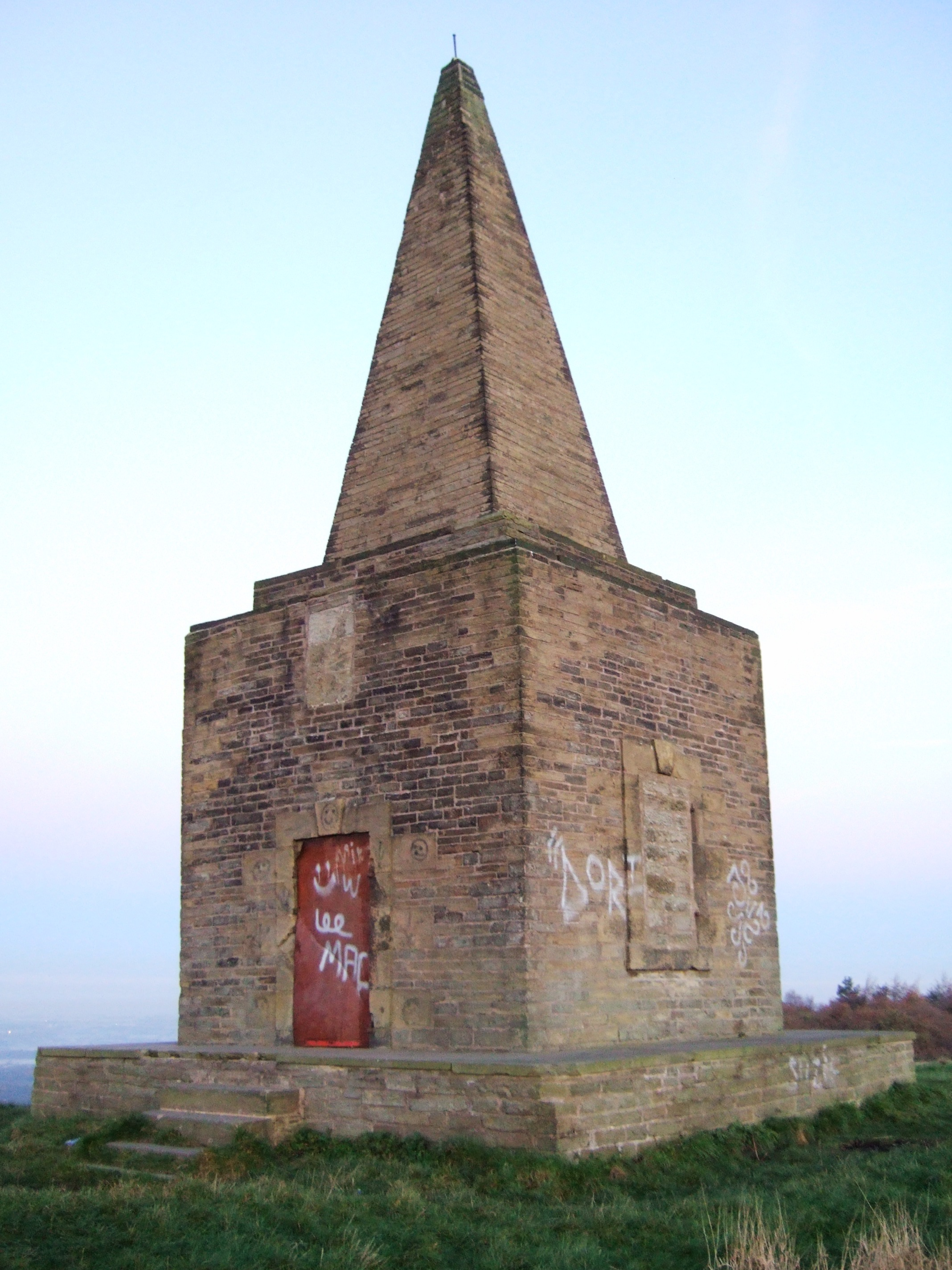
- Ashurst's Beacon, on the summit of Ashurst Hill

- Location in West Lancashire Location within Lancashire
- Population: 383 (2011)
- OS grid reference: SD494081
- Civil parish: Dalton
- District: West Lancashire
- Shire county: Lancashire
- Region: North West
- Country: England
- Sovereign state: United Kingdom
- Post town: WIGAN
- Postcode district: WN8
- Dialling code: 01695
- Police: Lancashire
- Fire: Lancashire
- Ambulance: North West
- UK Parliament: West Lancashire

Dalton is a village and civil parish in West Lancashire, England, near Skelmersdale and south of the River Douglas. Dalton was listed in the Domesday Book, and soon after the Norman conquest became part of the Barony of Manchester. It remained part of the Manchester fee as late as 1733. Dalton had a population of 348 (2001 Census), increasing to 383 at the 2011 Census.

The local landscape is dominated by Ashurst Hill, which rises 570 feet (170 m) above sea level and is crowned by Ashurst's Beacon. The beacon once formed part of a relay league stretching from Everton Brow above Liverpool to Lancaster Castle, which was in place (though unused) during the Anglo–Spanish War of 1585. The current structure dates from around 1800, when local landowner Sir William Ashurst decided that a more permanent beacon was needed for the oncoming Napoleonic Wars.

== See also ==
- Listed buildings in Dalton, Lancashire
