= Joe Kirby (teacher) =

British schoolteacher

- Occupation: Teacher
- Known for: Knowledge organiser; Education blogs; Translational research; Co-founder of Michaela Community School
- Notable work: Contribution to Battle Hymn of the Tiger Teachers (2016)
- Father: Roger Kirby
- Relatives: Vanessa Kirby (sister)

Joe Kirby is a British school teacher who is a Christian, the director of education at Athena Learning Trust, a multi-academy trust. He is a co-founder of Michaela Community School, where he was one of the 20 teaching staff that contributed to the book Battle Hymn of the Tiger Teachers, published in 2016. He now is the head master of North Walsham High School.

== Early life and education ==
Joe Kirby is from Wimbledon, London. After completing an International Baccalaureate, he attended the University of Warwick where he was elected president of its students' union. In this role, to integrate home and international students, he persuaded Archbishop Desmond Tutu to attend an event at his university. In addition, to raise funds for prostate cancer, he led a team of student volunteers on a hundred-mile walk across Britain.

He has two younger sisters, Juliet and actress Vanessa Kirby. Their mother is the founding editor of Country Living and their father is the prostate surgeon Roger Kirby.

== Career ==
Kirby is an English teacher who writes on using research in teaching. Prior to becoming director of education at Athena Learning Trust, and vice principal at Jane Austen College, part of the Inspiration Trust, Norwich, he was at Dunraven School in Streatham, and then was one of four deputy heads at Michaela Community School in Wembley, a school he helped establish.

Kirby is a blogger about education. Like a number of other younger British teachers including Tom Bennett and Daisy Christodoulou, Kirby has been inspired by American educator E. D. Hirsch. This has been reflected in his references to Hirsch in a large number of his blogs, popular messages that resulted in promoting Hirsch's's ideas, and increasing Kirby's influence on the debate on education in the UK. He has been mentioned and cited by the government school regulator Ofsted, British Secretary of State for Education Michael Gove and Schools Minister Nick Gibb.

=== Teaching methods ===
Kirby has written on teaching methods with maximum impact and minimum effort. He has advised that hundreds of words can be taught by explaining how words are formed.

At Michaela, he explained that methods were adapted to reduce teacher burnout because "common practices result in heavy workload, high burnout, and very, very high levels of teacher turnover". He rewrote Year 7's study of the Odyssey, removing the parts he felt were less important to read. His 2015 blog post "Marking is a Hornet", which described teachers' marking of homework as "high-effort" and "low-impact" like a hornet, and recommended saving time by asking pupils to self-assess and quiz themselves using checklists or oral feedback. The responsibility, he explains, lies in self-improvement and a collective sense of working for better outcomes. He was one of the 20 members of Michaela's staff that contributed to the book Battle Hymn of the Tiger Teachers, published in 2016 by John Catt Educational, edited by Michaela's head Katharine Birbalsingh and endorsed by Roger Scruton. In the book, Kirby explains the curriculum design and how eleven-year-olds are prepared for school in boot camp prior to the beginning of the school year, how the students are taught that "silence in lessons is golden, that it helps us listen and helps us learn", how teaching of factual knowledge is prioritised, and how consistency and simplicity in a "centralised system" allow students to complete homework with the aim of not overloading teachers with marking, thereby reducing burnout.

Kirby wrote about the knowledge organiser, a template on a single A4 sheet used by teachers and their pupils to clarify what is essential to learn. Usually one sided, it is occasionally two sides of one page. He calls the knowledge organiser “the most powerful tool in the arsenal of the curriculum designer”.

== Selected publications ==
=== Books ===
- How to Start on Teach First. Amazon ebook, 2013. (Editor)

=== Blog posts, opinion pieces, chapters ===
- "Marking is a hornet". pragmaticreform.wordpress.com 31 October 2015.
- "Knowledge, memory and testing" in Katharine Birbalsingh (Ed.) (2016) Battle Hymn of the Tiger Teachers: The Michaela Way. Melton: John Catt Educational. ISBN 9781909717961
- "The grateful ped(agogue): Why giving thanks may be a gift that gives to the giver". ResearchED. 26 September 2018
- "To sleep, perchance to learn". ResearchED. 28 February 2019.
