= Pool Academy =

Location
- Church Road; Pool, Cornwall, TR15 3PZ; England; 50.23024°N 5.27148°W

Information
- Type: Academy
- Department for Education URN: 136614 Tables
- Principal: Nick Ward
- Gender: Mixed
- Age: 11 to 16
- Enrolment: 904 as of January 2015
- Capacity: 800
- Colours: Black and Gold
- Publication: Pool Post
- Website: poolacademy.uk

Pool Academy, formerly Pool School, Pool Comprehensive School, Pool School and Community College and Pool Business and Enterprise College, is a mixed secondary school with academy status for students aged 11 to 16, located in Pool in the English county of Cornwall. Since 2023, it has been part of Athena Learning Trust.

The school is also the home ground of Duchy Hockey Club.

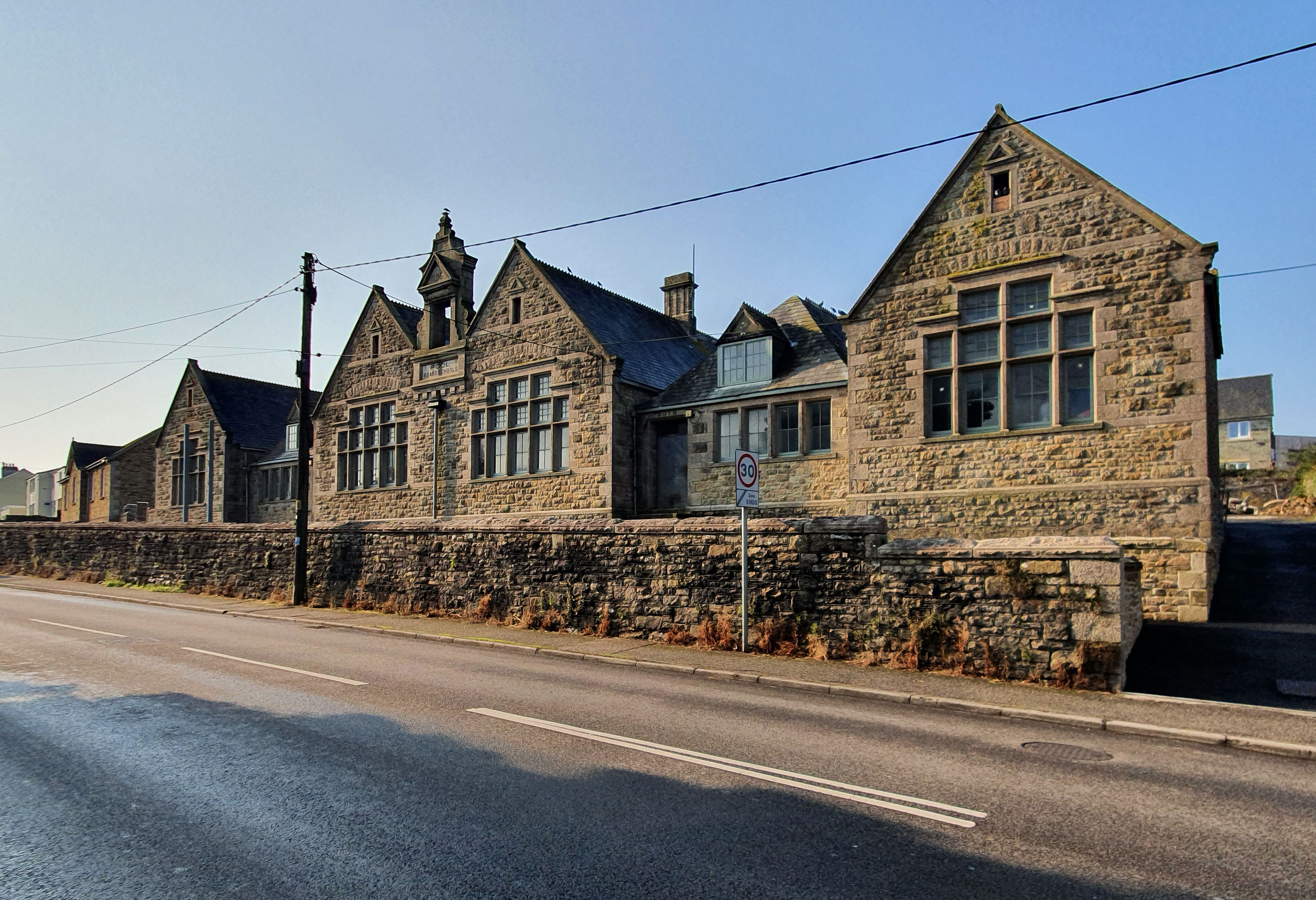
Old Pool School, built in 1896

== History ==
The school originated as Pool Board School, occupying a free Jacobean-style building on Church Road in Pool which was erected in 1896 and has been attributed to the Cornish architect Silvanus Trevail. A new school was built on the other side of Church Road in the 1970s; the old building continued in use as extra classroom space until 2003, when an expansion under the PFI schools building scheme made it no longer needed. Pool Old School was Grade II listed on 2 September 2003 and in late 2022 was listed for sale with conditional planning permission for conversion to housing.

Pool School and Community College gained specialist status in 2004 and was renamed Pool Business and Enterprise College. It was converted to academy status under the sponsorship of Launceston College effective 1 April 2011 and was renamed Pool Academy.

A student suicide in 2016 revealed problems with safeguarding at Pool Academy; an open verdict was recorded at the inquest, but a member of staff had failed to see the student while searching for another missing student. The ambulance service created and circulated guidance to schools on emergency response, and the school said it had equipped all students with search-enabled iPads. The school's 2018 GCSE results were among the three worst in Cornwall, with student progress falling below the Department for Education 'floor standard', and in early 2019 there were parent complaints that the school caterers were not providing sufficient food for all students to be fed, and that the free school meals allowance only paid for a sausage roll and a bottle of water.

The provision of iPads to incoming students continued during the Covid-19 pandemic shutdown in 2020, enabling remote learning. In 2026, an inclusion project by a group of Year 9 students within the Young Ambassador programme of the Youth Sport Trust was chosen as a national case study.

At the start of the 2022–23 academic year, Pool Academy instituted a new disciplinary policy which some parents complained was overly strict. On 1 September 2023, it became part of Athena Learning Trust (previously Launceston College Multi-Academy Trust). Like other Athena schools, it subsequently had high numbers of student suspensions, and parent complaints of harsh discipline led the Mayor of Camborne to call a public meeting in February 2026 to discuss the treatment of pupils at Pool Academy and Camborne Science and International Academy, another school in the same multi-academy trust.

Nick Ward, previously vice principal, became the school's principal in late 2021. He announced his retirement in 2026 and is to be succeeded in September 2026 by Tegen Thompson; Athena Learning Trust has also appointed Matthew Thompson, the principal of Launceston College, as executive principal of both Launceston College and Pool Academy.
