= Athena Learning Trust =

English Multi-academy trust

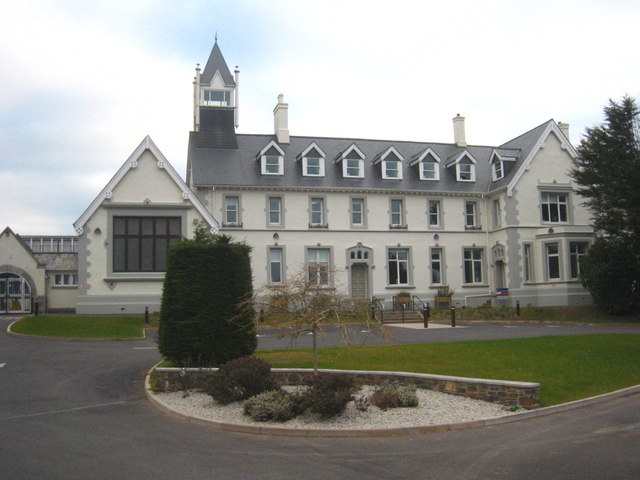
- Dunheved House at Launceston College, Cornwall, headquarters of the trust
- Formation: 19 July 2012; 14 years ago
- Type: Multi-academy trust
- Headquarters: Dunheved House, Dunheved Road, Launceston, PL15 9FB, England
- Interim Trust Leader: Mark Blackman
- Outgoing CEO: Ben Parnell
- Director of Education: Joe Kirby
- Chief Finance and Operations Officer: Shirley Si Ahmed
- Website: athenalearningtrust.uk
- Formerly called: Launceston College Multi-Academy Trust

Athena Learning Trust is an English multi-academy trust with primary and secondary schools in Cornwall and Devon. Founded in 2012 and based at Launceston College, it rebranded from Launceston College Multi-Academy Trust in 2022. The trust is known for enforcing strict discipline in its schools. In July 2026, after increasing criticism and the production of a documentary on its schools for Panorama, it announced it would dissolve.

== History ==
Athena Learning Trust was incorporated on 19 July 2012 as Launceston College, with Launceston College, an academy in Launceston, Cornwall, as its first school. Ben Parnell became the CEO of Launceston College Multi-Academy Trust in summer 2022, succeeding Claire Penfold. In September 2022, the trust rebranded as Athena Learning Trust.

The trust was successful in improving academic performance in many secondary schools, and in 2018 was called in to rescue a failing school. In 2025 it was shortlisted for the Multi-Academy Trust Association's "Most Improved Multi Academy Trust" award, and its head of governance and compliance, Georgina Fahey, was shortlisted for the Governance Professional of the Year award. In August 2025 it won the "Excellence in Education" award of the National Institute for Direct Instruction, an international organisation based in the United States.

Under Parnell, it also became known for strict discipline, including uniform requirements, restriction of toilet breaks, and punishment for small infractions such as dropping pens and looking out of the window. Joe Kirby, the trust's director of education, was a co-founder of Michaela Community School, a London school known for emphasising discipline. Athena schools had a 'two-strike' policy; after a warning, a second infraction resulted in detention, referred to as "reflection", and rule breaches in reflection were often punished by suspension, although the trust said in 2023 that individual schools decided their own disciplinary policies. The schools had very high suspension and exclusion numbers. Launceston College had searched students' phones. Students and parents protested, and the takeovers of both The Ilfracombe Academy in 2023 and Camborne Science and International Academy in 2024 followed parent expressions of concern and objections to becoming part of the trust.

In February 2026, the Mayor of Camborne called a public meeting to discuss concerns of parents about the treatment of pupils at Camborne Science and International Academy and Pool Academy. In March 2026, a public meeting was held in Launceston to discuss the treatment of pupils at Launceston College. Members of Cornwall Council expressed concern, one having removed their child from Launceston College, and the council tabled a motion to consider children's "mental, emotional health and wellbeing in our schools" at its meeting on 19 May 2026. The motion passed with one vote in opposition.

Parnell tendered his resignation as CEO in early May 2026. Mark Blackman was appointed temporary CEO, but Cornwall Live revealed that he had previously worked at Southerly Point Co-operative Multi-Academy Trust, a Cornwall trust which was dissolved after three of its schools received 'inadequate' Ofsted ratings. In June 2026, Launceston College said that it was seeking a better relationship with parents, and Athena announced a period of reflection on the trust's future direction. A BBC Panorama documentary titled "Britain's Strictest Schools", advertised as "the story of the schools that went too far", aired on 3 August 2026; prior to its airing, Athena announced in mid-July 2026 that the trust would be dissolved and its schools reassigned to other trusts. At the start of the following academic year in early September 2026, the trust was still in place.

== Schools ==
As of 3 August 2026, Athena Learning Trust comprises three primary schools in Cornwall, Egloskerry Primary School in Egloskerry (from 2017), Altarnun Primary School in Altarnun (from 2018), and Launceston Primary School in Launceston (from 2021), which was built new; and six secondary schools, three in Cornwall and three in Devon:

- Launceston College in Launceston, Cornwall, the founding school, from 1 January 2013
- Bideford College in Bideford, joined on 1 March 2016
- Atlantic Academy in Bideford, Devon, joined on 1 October 2018
- Pool Academy in Pool, Cornwall, joined on 1 September 2023
- The Ilfracombe Academy in Ilfracombe, Devon, joined on 1 November 2023
- Camborne Science and International Academy in Camborne, Cornwall, joined on 1 January 2024

Enrollment in the secondary schools was approximately 6,500 at the time of filming for Panorama.
