= Launceston College =

Launceston College may refer to:

- Launceston College, Cornwall, a school in Launceston, Cornwall, England
- Launceston College, Tasmania, a school in Launceston, Tasmania, Australia
