= Battle Hymn of the Tiger Teachers =

2016 book edited by Katharine Birbalsingh

- Published: 2016
- Publisher: John Catt Educational
- ISBN: 9781909717961

Battle Hymn of the Tiger Teachers: The Michaela Way is a book edited by Katharine Birbalsingh, head of Michaela Community School in Wembley, and published by John Catt Educational in 2016. It has been endorsed by the philosopher Roger Scruton. Twenty teachers from the school contributed to the book, including Joe Kirby.

In a review for Schools Week, Jules Daulby awarded it with three out of five stars. She commended Joe Kirby's chapter on curriculum design but said that the book "goes downhill after this".

A second volume, Michaela: The Power of Culture, was published in 2020.

== See also ==
- Battle Hymn of the Tiger Mother
- Joe Kirby, contributor.
- Knowledge organiser
