= Dunraven School =

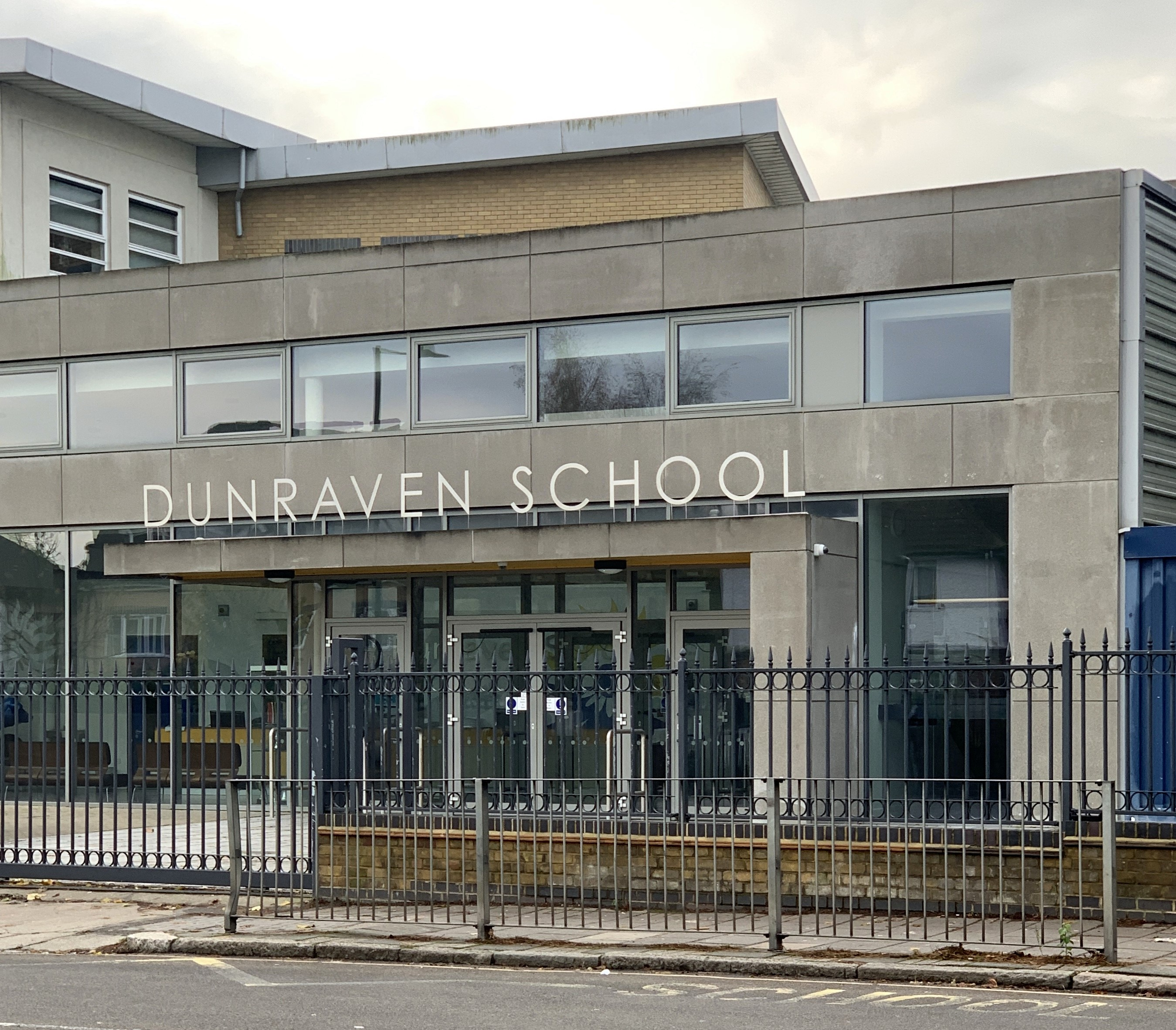

Location
- 94-98 Leigham Court Road; Streatham, Greater London, SW16 2QB; England
- Coordinates: 51.4332°N 0.1200°W

Information
- Type: Academy
- Motto: Excellence for all
- Local authority: Lambeth London Borough Council
- Trust: Dunraven Educational Trust
- Department for Education URN: 137093 Tables
- Ofsted: Reports
- Head of school: Guy Maidment; Michaela Christian
- Gender: Mixed
- Age range: 4–18
- Enrolment: 1,656 (2019)
- Capacity: 1,767
- Colours: Royal Blue and gold
- Website: www.dunraven.org.uk

Dunraven School is a 4–18 mixed, all-through school and sixth form with academy status in Streatham, Greater London, England. Its buildings are based over two sites that were previously used as a teacher training college (formerly known as Upper School, now the South Site) and a primary school (formerly known as Lower School, now the North Site and occupied by the sixth form).

In 2009, its sports hall was built using 40 old freight containers, a construction that was subsequently awarded the British Construction Industry Award.

== History ==
The school takes its name after Irish liberal peer, the Earl of Dunraven who, as part of his strategy to represent the area in parliament in the 1920s, gave a donation which resulted in the purchase of a plot of land in the then Leigham Court Estate, which was used to house a school. In 1960, the school extended to nearby Mount Nod Road and in 1970 the Adare Walk site transferred to occupy the Philippa Fawcett Teaching College site on Leigham Court Road, which continues to be Dunraven's Science, Technology, Drama and Cafeteria block.

During the 1980s, Richard Townsend became headmaster, and in 2004, he was succeeded by David Boyle. Prior to 2004, there were five permanent exclusions per year. This then dropped to zero. The number of temporary exclusions also has dropped from 510 before 2004 to 10.

In 2011, the school became an Academy and was designated as a Leading Edge School and a National Support School. In 2013, it became an all-through school, with children being able to start in Reception. The following year, the education watchdog Ofsted judged Dunraven as ‘outstanding’ overall, and in 2016, it was designated as a National Teaching School. That same year, the Dunraven Educational Trust was established and two years later it commenced work with two primary schools.

=== Construction of sports hall ===
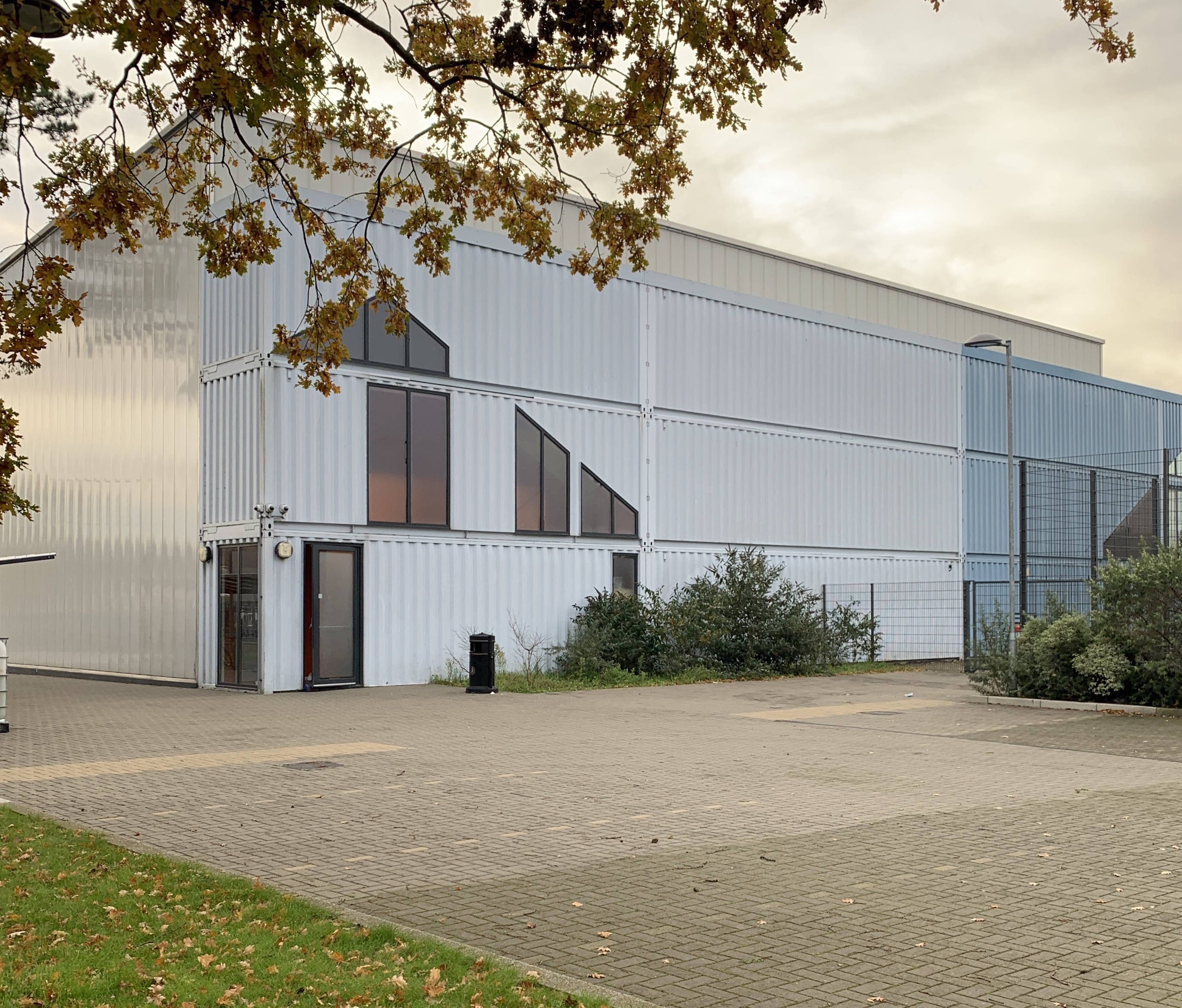
Image of the sports hall.

In 2008, Container City was commissioned by the London Borough of Lambeth, with funding from the Building Schools for the Future scheme, to construct Dunraven's full-height sports hall. Made using old 40 freight containers, it took three months to build, with its containers being modified off site, and three days to install, the first of its type in the world, and built with little disruption to school life. Similar sports halls were subsequently built in India, China, Norway, USA and Nigeria. Over its three storeys, it has a full sized basketball court, three sides of viewing galleries and two changing rooms. It is also connected to the school's rainwater harvesting facility, has lighting controlled by motion sensors, and a heating system controlled by the weather.

In 2009, the school was awarded the British Construction Industry Award and the Small Building Project Award. It was also a finalist in that year's Prime Minister's award for Better Public Building and the 2010 Public Building Project of the Year.

== Admissions ==
The admissions policy at Dunraven was based on whether the applicant had a sibling at the school, social factors, medical need and how far away the applying student lived. By 2005, it had introduced an admissions test, placing pupils in one of five ability bands and subsequently taking one-fifth of its annual intake from each of these bands. Then the three traditional admissions criteria apply. In the same year the school had 1,200 pupils and was visited by Tony Blair to see how its admissions process worked.

=== Primary school ===
For junior admissions, a Common Application Form (CAF) from the applying student's Local Authority is required. An additional Supplementary Information Form (SIF) is required if the child is out of age group or a deferred entry, or if any of the priority admissions criteria apply:

- Looked after children
- Siblings
- Medical and/or social reasons
- Children of staff at the school
- Distance: proximity of the child’s home address

=== Secondary school ===
For secondary school admissions, both the CAF and the SIF are required.

== Dunraven Educational Trust ==
- Van Gogh Primary — The Durand School was taken on by the trust in June 2018. They have developed the Hackford Road site and rebranded it. It is now named after the artist who resided opposite in 1873–4. A blue plaque marks that spot.
- Goldfinch Primary School — Joined the trust in January 2019.
- Horizons Leisure Club, fitness centre

== Notable alumni ==
- Naomi Campbell, model, actress, and businesswoman

== Notable staff ==
- Katharine Birbalsingh, former assistant headteacher
- Joe Kirby, creator of knowledge organisers
