= ResearchED =

International nonprofit academic organization

- Formation: 2013
- Purpose: To bridge the gap between research and practice in education
- Official language: English
- Directors: Tom Bennett; Rebecca Allen; Daisy Christodoulou; Sam Freedman; Alex Quigley; Dylan Wiliam
- Website: researchED Home

ResearchED is a teacher-led organisation established in 2013 by Tom Bennett that aims to make teachers research literate and pseudo-science proof. It holds teacher conferences throughout the UK and internationally. Speakers have included Daniel T. Willingham, Daisy Christodoulou, Nick Gibb, John Sweller, John Hattie, Katharine Birbalsingh, Natalie Wexler, Dylan Wiliam, and John Mighton.

Its official publication is the quarterly journal ResearchED, published in partnership with John Catt Educational and founded in 2018. Contributors to the first issue included Daisy Christodoulou, John Sweller and Daniel T. Willingham, who also featured on its front cover.

== Origins ==
ResearchED was founded by Tom Bennett in 2013. According to its website, the organization came about after a discussion between Bennett, Sam Freedman, and science writer Ben Goldacre. It grew out of Bennett's frustration that teachers "were not leaving their initial training familiar with the best and latest research on how to teach, the way people learn, remember, focus and behave".

== Conferences ==
ResearchED's conferences have grown over time to more than 1,000 participants by 2017.

== Reception ==
In a 2020 article published by the British Educational Research Journal, academic Steven Watson accused ResearchED of astroturfing and as an 'outrider for [Michael] Gove's education reforms'.

Daniel T. Willingham, a guest speaker at a ResearchED conference, refers to ResearchED as an "organization by and for practitioners, meant to bring education research to the public via low-cost conferences throughout the world, and now a magazine",

The UK Minister of State for Schools, Nick Gibb, praised the organisation, calling it "a grassroots, teacher-led revolt against the old order in education".

== See also ==
- Evidence-based education
