= The Ilfracombe Academy =

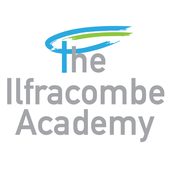

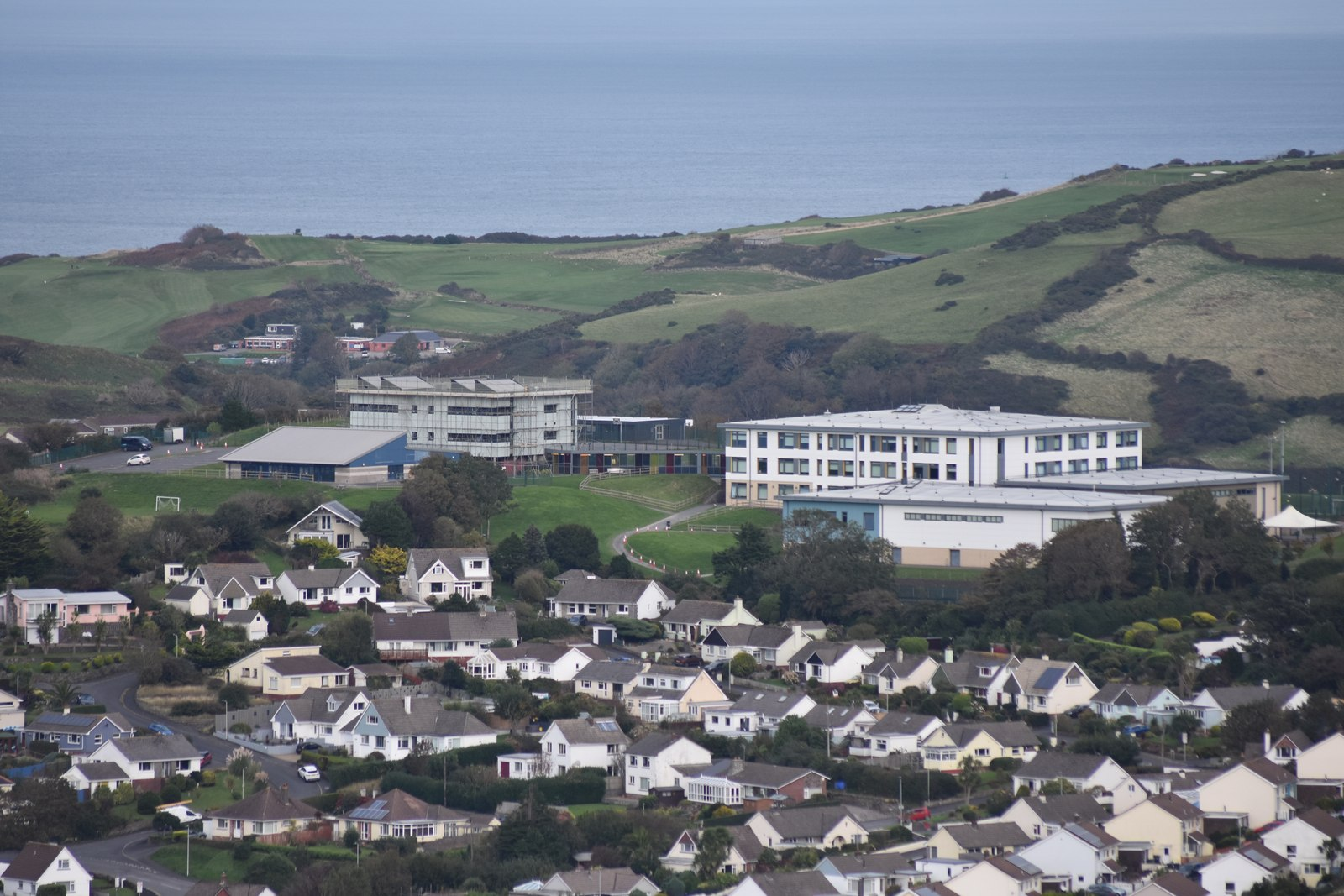
- The Ilfracombe Academy campus, 2024

Location
- Worth Road; Ilfracombe, Devon, EX34 9JB; England; 51°12′17″N 4°06′52″W

Information
- Type: Academy
- Religious affiliation: Church Of England
- Established: 1970 (as comprehensive) 2013 (as academy)
- Department for Education URN: 139553 Tables
- Ofsted: Reports
- Principal: Stephen Rogers
- Gender: Coeducational
- Age: 11 to 18
- Enrolment: 1,094
- Houses: Lee, Hele, Capstone, Watersmeet
- Colours: Blue, red, Green and yellow
- Website: http://www.ilfracombeacademy.org.uk/

The Ilfracombe Church of England Academy is a coeducational Church of England secondary school and sixth form with academy status in the North Devon town of Ilfracombe, England. Opened in 1970, it became part of St Christopher's Multi Academy Trust of the Diocese of Exeter, and then in 2023 of Athena Learning Trust.

== History ==
The school opened in 1970 as Ilfracombe School & Community College; it was the first purpose-built comprehensive school in Devon, and opened with a capacity of 1,000 and specialised arts facilities including a drama hall, a closed circuit TV studio, and rooms for woodwork, metalwork, needlework, pottery, design, and technical drawing. The buildings were designed by Stillman & Eastwick-Field and the school was officially opened on 2 October 1970 by then Education Secretary Margaret Thatcher. It was later called Ilfracombe College. Following fundraising and negotiations from 2001, in 2004 the college was awarded specialist status in Media Arts and was renamed Ilfracombe Arts College. The buildings were expanded in 2004 with a dining hall which could also be used for performances, and conversion of existing space for computer instruction. In 2007, the arts department relocated to a £3.4 million arts block named the Beacon Arts Centre, and the former art rooms were refurbished into new administration, student services, and learning support areas, and the former student services into a conference room with video conferencing facilities.

Ilfracombe Arts College converted to academy status on 1 May 2013, becoming Ilfracombe Church of England Academy as part of St Christopher's Multi Academy Trust, which was established by the Diocese of Exeter to facilitate conversion of Church of England schools in Devon to academies. The main school building was replaced in 2017, and the old building was then demolished.

On 1 November 2023, following a consultation period, the Ilfracombe Academy left St. Christopher's and joined a different multi-academy trust, Athena Learning Trust, while remaining a Church of England school. It then had 1,066 pupils. The school showed academic improvement under Athena, but several parents protested at the strict discipline which was introduced by the trust from the start of the 2023–24 academic year; during 2023, 2024 and 2025, the Ilfracombe Academy had almost five times the average rate of suspensions in English schools. In July 2026 the trust announced that it would dissolve.

The principal is Stephen Rogers. The first head teacher was J. F. Gale. Later head teachers included Colin Eaves, Brian Sarahan and Sharon Marshall.

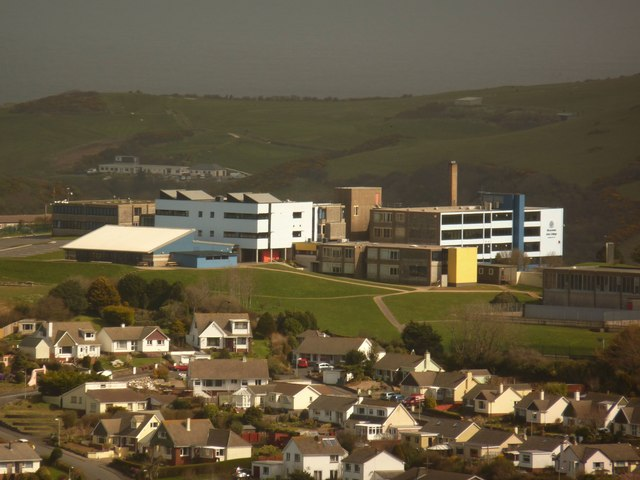
Ilfracombe Arts College, 2009
