= Anne E. Cunningham =

Developmental psychologist (born 1955)

- Citizenship: American
- Occupations: Distinguished Professor, Berkeley School of Education
- Awards: Reid Lyon Award, California Reading Institute Leadership Award, 2007; George Graham Award, University of Virginia, 2006

Academic background
- Education: Michigan State University Oakland University

Academic work
- Discipline: Developmental Scientist
- Sub-discipline: Early reading; Reading development; Professional development
- Institutions: University of California, Berkeley

Anne E. Cunningham (born 1953) is an American cognitive scientist and educational researcher known for her work on early reading acquisition, reading development, and the impact of professional development in reading for PreK-12 educators. She is a Distinguished Professor in the Learning Sciences and Human Development cluster at University of California, Berkeley.

Cunningham is a Fellow of the American Psychological Association (Division 7: Developmental Psychology) and the American Educational Research Association. She has been awarded fellowships from the National Science Foundation and McDonnell Foundation for Cognitive Studies. She has served on multiple editorial boards including Scientific Studies of Reading, Journal of Learning Disabilities, and Reading Research Quarterly. Her role as a member of the National Early Literacy Panel (NELP) which published a final report in 2008 entitled, Developing Early Literacy: A Scientific Synthesis of Early Literacy Development and Implications for Intervention provided the opportunity to contribute her knowledge of early reading, classroom practice and teacher education to the research and findings. Cunningham has chaired the Outstanding Dissertation Award for Division of School Psychology of the American Psychological Association.

Cunningham is a trusted source in several articles about the role of parents in early reading with infants in The New Republic, The New York Times, and the importance of early reading instruction and intervention in Education Week. She clarified that the technique of speed reading is a "skimming" strategy and may be "insufficient" for general reading purposes in The Wall Street Journal, as adults, on average, can not read more than 300 words per minute.

== Awards ==
Cunningham's doctoral dissertation on the importance of development of phonemic awareness to early reading competency was awarded the Outstanding Dissertation Award by the International Reading Association in 1988. In 1991, Cunningham received a post-doctoral grant from the University of Toronto. In 2009, she received a $1.3 million grant from the Institute for Education Sciences to develop a model for early childhood educator professional development using teacher study groups over four years.

== Biography ==
Anne Cunningham began her career as a pre-school, elementary school teacher and reading specialist in Clarkston Community School District in Michigan in the United States.

She received her B.S. degree in Child Development and Teaching at Michigan State University in East Lansing. Her interest in understanding how children learn to read led her to attend graduate school at Oakland University, Rochester, Michigan, where she obtained her masters in Developmental Psychology, and her Ph.D. in Developmental Psychology at the University of Michigan, Ann Arbor. She worked under the supervision of Keith Stanovich at the University of Michigan.

Cunningham's early research focused on phonological processing and soon after studies showing the differences between phonological and orthographic processing in developing reading. She may be best known for work on vocabulary development, the role of print reading and how both contribute to background knowledge that enables comprehension, often referred to as the "Matthew Effect", a term originally coined by sociologist Robert K. Merton in 1968 to describe how initial advantages accrue over time, based on the parable in the Book of Matthew. The 1997 landmark study designed with Stanovich, Early reading acquisition and its relation to reading experience 10 years later was published in Developmental Psychology. Cunningham extended Keith Stanovich's notion of "the rich getting richer" to the teaching of reading and children's vocabulary acquisition. Cunningham has spent multiple years examining the role or pre-school and elementary teacher knowledge about reading and related professional development models.

== Research ==
Cunningham's early findings showed that phonological awareness is highly predictive of early reading achievement, and that general intelligence contributes less to reading skill than was previously thought. First graders who were also receiving phonics instruction did better on a transfer measure when phonemic awareness instruction was explicit and metacognitive than implicit.

In 1990, Cunningham developed the Title Recognition Test as a quick check-off measure of how much children read. For children in third through fifth grade, print exposure was linked to vocabulary, general knowledge and spelling. In a ten year longitudinal study, reading ability in first grade predicted the variance in 11th grade print exposure.

Cunningham's longitudinal study in 1997 regarding early reading acquisition and its relation to students reading ability ten years later, alongside her colleague, Keith Stanovich, is heavily cited in subsequent studies and arguments about reading skill instruction and reading experiences strengthening each other over time. This study has also been used to support the importance of early intervention, as well as the role of independent and wide reading. It also established Reading Volume as a construct within reading research. A summary of the paper appeared in American Educator in 1998 which brought these ideas to a wider audience of K-12 educational leaders. The paper was subsequently translated and reprinted into German in 2004 and into Spanish in Chile in 2007.

Cunningham turned to the role of orthographic processing and measured the distinction between it and phonological processing for early reading beyond grade one. A longitudinal study of first through third graders showed that this construct independently predicts growth in word recognition. Two experiments had children read real words in connected text (rather than pseudowords as were used in other studies of word recognition). The experiments showed that children acquire word-specific spellings by decoding words themselves while reading. Children's prior orthographic knowledge predicted how much they learned, separate from the effects of decoding ability.

In 2014, Cunningham published BookSmart: How to Develop and Support Successful, Motivated Readers with Jamie Zibulsky, Ph.D with the goal of translating reading research into practical guidance for parents and caregivers. The deeply-researched book is based on the corpus of findings that strong early reading experiences with a caregiver make children more likely to develop both reading skill and motivation to read later in school and life. The guidance covers praising reading effort with specific feedback, building a home environment and home library, rich in print, using stories to discuss social and emotional situations and challenges, and using technology only to supplement print reading, not replace it.

More recently, Cunningham has focused on the impact of kindergarten through third-grade teachers' knowledge of phonology and orthography of English. She found that teachers had limited knowledge of speech sounds (in English) or related instructional moves (for example: counting the number of sounds in exit (5) and sun (3) or syllabication), but rated that knowledge highly. She and her colleagues designed a professional development model for pre-school teachers using expert-led study groups. Teachers made significant gains in content and pedagogical knowledge.

== Representative publications ==
- Cunningham, A.E., Nathan, R., Raher, K.S. (2011). Orthographic processing in models of word recognition. Handbook of Reading Research, Volume IV. Taylor & Francis. ISBN 978-1-136-89141-0
- Cunningham, A. E., Zibulsky, J., Stanovich, K. E., & Stanovich, P. K. (2009). How teachers would spend their time teaching language arts: The mismatch between self-reported and best practices. Journal of Learning Disabilities, 42, 418-430. https://pubmed.ncbi.nlm.nih.gov/19525477/
- Cunningham, A. E. & Stanovich, K.E. (1998). What reading does for the mind. American Educator, 22, 8-15. https://eric.ed.gov/?id=EJ571299
- Cunningham, A. E. (1990). Explicit versus implicit instruction in phonemic awareness, Journal of Experimental Child Psychology. Volume 50, Issue 3: 429-444. https://doi.org/10.1016/0022-0965(90)90079-N
- Stanovich, K. E., Cunningham, A. E., & Cramer, B. B. (1984). Assessing phonological awareness in kindergarten children: Issues of task comparability. Journal of Experimental Child Psychology, 38(2), 175–190. https://doi.org/10.1016/0022-0965(84)90120-6
- Stanovich, K. E., Cunningham, A. E., & Feeman, D. J. (1984). Intelligence, Cognitive Skills, and Early Reading Progress. Reading Research Quarterly, 19(3), 278–303. https://doi.org/10.2307/747822

== Books ==
- Cunningham, A. E., & Zibulsky, J., (2014). Book Smart: How to Support and Develop a Successful Motivated Reader. Oxford University Press.
