= Vanessa Kirby =

British actress

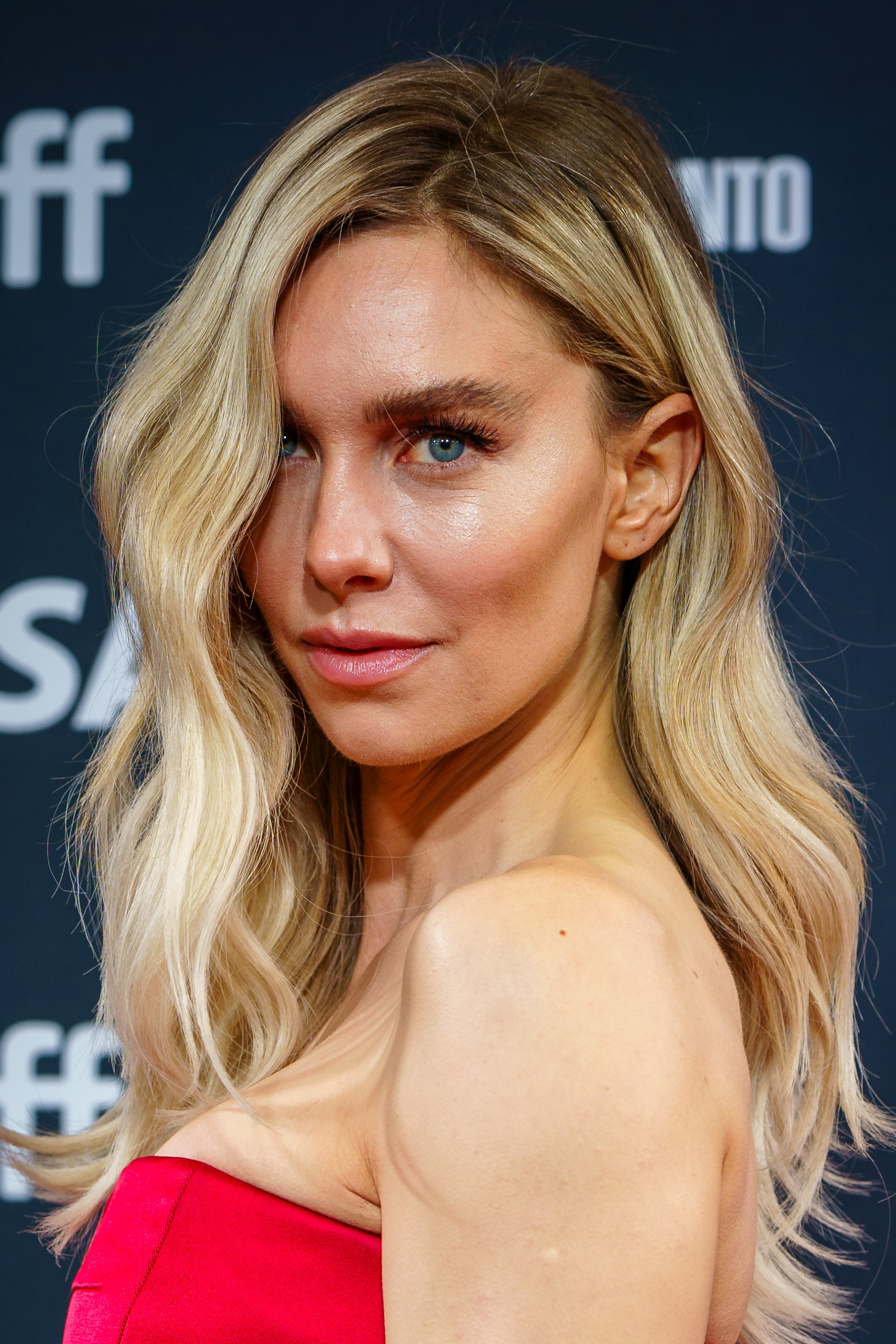
- Kirby at the 2024 Toronto International Film Festival
- Born: 18 April 1987/1988 (age 38–39) (Note: Sources have reported Kirby's year of birth as 1987 and 1988); London, England
- Education: University of Exeter (BA)
- Occupation: Actress
- Years active: 2010–present
- Partners: Callum Turner (2015–2019); Paul Rabil (2022–present)
- Children: 1
- Father: Roger Kirby
- Relatives: Joe Kirby (brother)

Vanessa Nuala Kirby (born 18 April 1987 or 1988) is a British actress. She began her career on stage, giving acclaimed performances in the plays All My Sons (2010), A Midsummer Night's Dream (2010), Women Beware Women (2011), Three Sisters (2012), and A Streetcar Named Desire (2014) as Stella Kowalski.

Kirby's screen breakthrough came with portraying Princess Margaret in the Netflix drama series The Crown (2016–2017), earning the BAFTA Television Award for Best Supporting Actress and a nomination for the Emmy Award for Best Supporting Actress. Further acclaim came for headlining the melodrama film Pieces of a Woman (2020), receiving the Volpi Cup for Best Actress and nominations for the Academy Award and BAFTA Award for Best Actress.

Kirby developed her career with starring roles in the action films Hobbs & Shaw (2019) and two Mission: Impossible films (2018–2023), and in the historical drama Napoleon (2023) as Empress Joséphine. She also portrays Sue Storm / Invisible Woman in the Marvel Cinematic Universe (MCU), beginning with The Fantastic Four: First Steps (2025).

== Early life ==
Kirby was raised in Wimbledon, London. Her parents are Jane Cooper Kirby, a former Country Living magazine writer, and Roger Kirby, a retired surgeon and President of the Royal Society of Medicine. She has two siblings: Joe, a school teacher, and Juliet, a theatrical agent.

After attending Lady Eleanor Holles School and being turned down by the London Academy of Music and Dramatic Art (LAMDA), Kirby took a gap year to travel and work in an AIDS hospice in South Africa. She then studied English at the University of Exeter.

== Career ==
=== 2010–2014: Stage debut and early works ===
Kirby signed to a talent agency and met the theatre director David Thacker, who gave her three starring roles in 2010 at the Octagon Theatre Bolton: All My Sons, Ghosts, and A Midsummer Night's Dream. For All My Sons, she won the BIZA Rising Star Award at the Manchester Evening News Theatre Awards, worth £5,000. She also starred as Rosalind in As You Like It at the West Yorkshire Playhouse in Leeds. Alfred Hickling of The Guardian described her as a "significant new talent", and stated: "Kirby gives a performance of statuesque distinction as Helena".

In 2011, Kirby appeared at the National Theatre in Women Beware Women, directed by Marianne Elliott, alongside Harriet Walter and Harry Melling. She also appeared in the play The Acid Test by Anya Reiss at the Royal Court Theatre, directed by Simon Godwin. For her performance, Kirby earning praise from Paul Taylor of The Independent, who described her as "a star if ever I saw one". That same year, Kirby made her television debut in two BBC series: The Hour and as Estella in Great Expectations.

Kirby filmed the British crime movie The Rise in early 2012. The film premièred at the Toronto International Film Festival to favourable reviews. She played Masha in the stage production by Benedict Andrews of Three Sisters at the Young Vic in September 2012, earning good reviews. Matt Trueman of Time Out wrote: "In a super cast given licence to shine, Kirby stands out as Masha".

In 2013, Kirby returned to the Royal National Theatre to play the Queen of England Isabella of France in Edward II opposite John Heffernan. Michael Billington for The Guardian said that Kirby delivers a "strong performance". Kirby had a supporting role in Richard Curtis's romantic comedy film About Time, starring Rachel McAdams. She appeared in the American film Charlie Countryman, and in one episode of the British TV series Agatha Christie's Poirot.

In the summer of 2014, Kirby played Stella Kowalski in A Streetcar Named Desire, again collaborating with Benedict Andrews at the Young Vic, alongside Gillian Anderson as Blanche Dubois and Ben Foster as Stanley. She won Best Supporting Actress category at the 2014 Whatsonstage Awards. Also in 2014, Kirby appeared in Queen and Country, written and directed by John Boorman.

=== 2015–2020: Breakthrough and international recognition ===
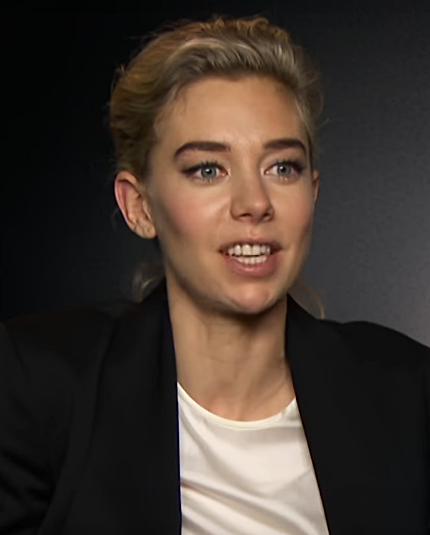
Kirby in 2017, promoting The Crown

In 2015, Kirby appeared in Everest as American socialite Sandy Hill Pittman, and in the space opera film Jupiter Ascending by The Wachowskis. On television, Kirby made appearances in the British television drama film The Dresser, alongside Anthony Hopkins and Ian McKellen; and had a main role in the series The Frankenstein Chronicles.

In May 2015 Kirby was cast as Princess Margaret in Netflix's The Crown, a historical drama series about the reign of Queen Elizabeth II. For her performance, Kirby was nominated for the BAFTA for Best Supporting Actress in 2017, and won the award for the season two in 2018. For this role, she received praise from critics and rose to international prominence.

In 2016, Kirby played Elena in Robert Icke's production of Uncle Vanya at the Almeida Theatre, for which she received highly positive reviews, with Matt Trueman of Variety writing that her performance: "confirms her as the outstanding stage actress of her generation, capable of the most unexpected choices". During this year, Kirby had three screen roles: she played Zelda Fitzgerald in Genius; she played the leading role in the sci-fi film Kill Command; and featured in the romantic drama film Me Before You.

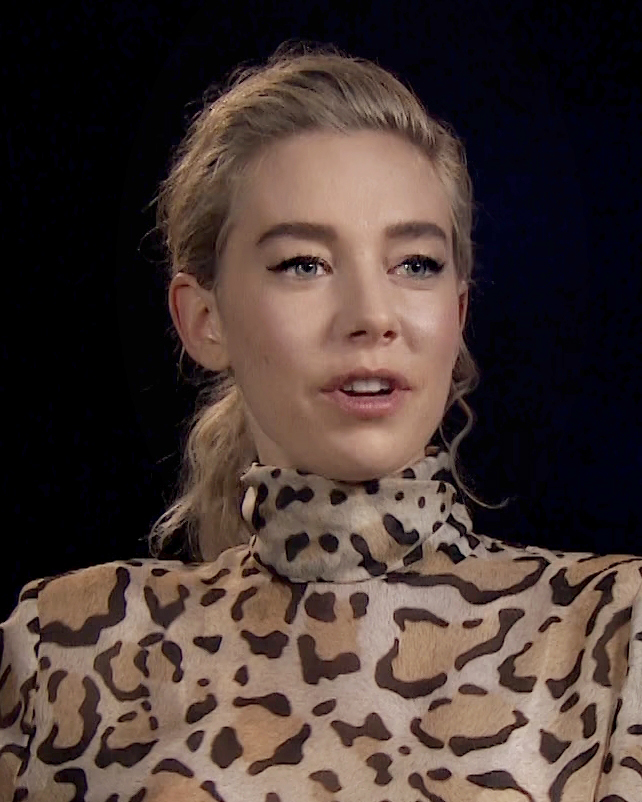
Kirby during a 2018 interview for the promotion of Mission: Impossible – Fallout

In 2018, Kirby returned to the stage and played the title character in Polly Stenham's Julie, an adaptation of August Strindberg's Miss Julie, at the Royal National Theatre. On the big screen, she starred in two action franchise films: Mission: Impossible – Fallout (2018) opposite Tom Cruise and Fast and Furious: Hobbs & Shaw (2019) alongside Dwayne Johnson and Jason Statham. For her role in Hobbs & Shaw, Kambole Campbell thought that: "Vanessa Kirby steals the show with wry wit and casual lethality". Kirby also appeared in the biopic Mr Jones, who loosely tells the story of Gareth Jones. The film was directed by Agnieszka Holland and competed for the Golden Bear at the 69th Berlin International Film Festival.

During 2019, Kirby was cast in the French thriller Suddenly ("Soudain Seuls"), alongside Jake Gyllenhaal, but following a disagreement between the director Thomas Bidegain and Gyllenhaal, the film was rewritten and recast. The same year, Kirby was one of the favourites for the role of Black Canary in Birds of Prey, but the role went to Jurnee Smollett.

In 2020, Kirby portrayed Martha, a grief-stricken woman, in Kornél Mundruzcó's Pieces of a Woman, a film revolving around the trauma and grief surrounding baby loss. The film received positive reviews, with Kirby garnering critical acclaim. Peter Debruge wrote for Variety that "[...] this is ultimately Kirby's movie, as the stage marvel [...] delivers her most impressive screen performance to date". David Fear from Rolling Stone called her performance "transcendent". Kirby won the Volpi Cup for Best Actress at the 2020 Venice Film Festival, where the film premiered. She went on to receive various nominations, notably for the Academy Award, the Golden Globe, the BAFTA Award, and the Screen Actors Guild Award.

Also at the 77th Venice International Film Festival, Kirby promoted The World to Come, directed by Mona Fastvold and also starring Katherine Waterston. The film won the Queer Lion award for best LGBTQ-themed film during the festival. In his review for The Guardian, Xan Brooks note that: "Kirby gives a fine, charismatic turn as the free-spirited Tallie". For The Independent, Clarisse Loughrey said: "Kirby’s performance is thrillingly, seductively, alive".

=== 2021–present: Independent films and blockbusters ===
In 2021, Kirby co-founded, with her sister Juliet, the London-based production company Aluna Entertainment which has a first look deal with Netflix. The same year, she played the leading role in the drama film Italian Studies. David Fear from Rolling Stones wrote that Kirby delivers a: "completely raw, guileless, ego-less performance".

Between 2021 and 2023, Kirby was one of the hosts of the True Spies podcast, alongside Hayley Atwell, Sophia Di Martino, and Daisy Ridley. In 2022, she appeared in the drama film The Son with Hugh Jackman, which had its world premiere at the 79th Venice International Film Festival. Despite mixed reviews from critics, the performances of Jackman and Kirby were praised. Clayton Davis, for Variety, said: "Kirby is reinventing the wheel of acting with a masterfully executed physical portrayal".

She replaced Jodie Comer as Empress Joséphine de Beauharnais, Napoleon Bonaparte's first wife, in the historical drama film Napoleon (2023) with Joaquin Phoenix in the title role, and directed by Ridley Scott. Kirby also reprised her role of Alanna Mitsopolis, alias the White Widow, in Mission: Impossible – Dead Reckoning Part One (2023). In February 2024, Kirby was cast as Sue Storm / Invisible Woman in the Marvel Cinematic Universe film The Fantastic Four: First Steps which was released on 25 July 2025. She will reprise the role in Avengers: Doomsday (2026) and Avengers: Secret Wars (2027).

In March 2024, it was announced that Kirby would be playing Lynette, the leading role in the Netflix adaptation of The Night Always Comes based on the Willy Vlautin novel. Filming took place in Portland during spring 2024.

== Personal life ==
From 2015 to 2019, Kirby was in a relationship with English actor Callum Turner. Since 2022, she has been in a relationship with Paul Rabil, an American former professional lacrosse player, co-founder and President of Premier Lacrosse League. During CCXP Mexico in May 2025, Kirby and Rabil revealed that the couple were expecting their first child. On 7 September 2025, Kirby announced that she had given birth to her and Rabil's first child.

== Acting credits ==
Key
†	Denotes films that have not yet been released

=== Film ===
Year	Title	Role	Notes
2010	Love/Loss	Jane	
2012	The Rise	Nicola	
2012	Nora	Young woman	Short film
2013	Charlie Countryman	Felicity	
2013	About Time	Joanna	
2014	The Exchange	Woman	Short film
2014	Insomniacs	Jade	Short film
2014	Queen and Country	Dawn Rohan	
2014	National Theatre Live: A Streetcar Named Desire	Stella Kowalski	
2014	Off the Page: Devil in the Details	Jessica	Short film
2015	Jupiter Ascending	Katharine Dunlevy	
2015	Bone in the Throat	Sophie	
2015	Everest	Sandy Hill	
2016	Genius	Zelda Fitzgerald	
2016	Kill Command	Katherine Mills	
2016	Me Before You	Alicia Dewares	
2018	Mission: Impossible – Fallout	Alanna Mitsopolis / White Widow	
2019	Mr Jones	Ada Brooks	
2019	Hobbs & Shaw	Hattie Shaw	
2020	Pieces of a Woman	Martha Weiss	
2020	The World to Come	Tallie	
2021	Italian Studies	Alina Reynolds	Also executive producer
2022	The Son	Beth	
2023	Mission: Impossible – Dead Reckoning Part One	Alanna Mitsopolis / White Widow	
2023	Napoleon	Empress Joséphine	
2024	Eden	Dore Strauch	
2025	Mission: Impossible – The Final Reckoning	Alanna Mitsopolis / White Widow	Archival footage only
2025	The Fantastic Four: First Steps	Sue Storm / Invisible Woman	
2025	Night Always Comes	Lynette	Also producer
2026	Avengers: Doomsday †	Sue Storm / Invisible Woman	Completed
TBA	Liminal †	TBA	Filming

=== Television ===
Year	Title	Role	Notes
2011	The Hour	Ruth Elms	3 episodes
2011	Great Expectations	Estella Havisham	Miniseries; 3 episodes
2012	Labyrinth	Alice Tanner	Miniseries; 2 episodes
2013	Agatha Christie's Poirot	Celia Ravenscroft	Episode: "Elephants Can Remember"
2015	The Dresser	Irene	Television film
2015	The Frankenstein Chronicles	Lady Jemima Hervey	Main role; 7 episodes
2016, 2017, 2022	The Crown	Princess Margaret, Countess of Snowdon	Main role (seasons 1–2); Guest role (season 5); 18 episodes

=== Theatre ===
Year	Title	Playwright	Role	Venue
2010	All My Sons	Arthur Miller	Ann Deever	Octagon Theatre
2010	Ghosts	Henrik Ibsen	Regina Engstrand	Octagon Theatre
2010	A Midsummer Night's Dream	William Shakespeare	Helena	Octagon Theatre
2010	As You Like It	William Shakespeare	Rosalind	West Yorkshire Playhouse
2011	Women Beware Women	Thomas Middleton	Isabella	Royal National Theatre
2011	The Acid Test	Anya Reiss	Dana	Royal Court Theatre
2012	Three Sisters	Anton Chekhov	Maria "Masha" Kulygina	Young Vic
2013	Edward II	Christopher Marlowe	Isabella of France	Royal National Theatre
2014	A Streetcar Named Desire	Tennessee Williams	Stella Kowalski	Young Vic
2016	Uncle Vanya	Anton Chekhov	Helena Serebryakova	Almeida Theatre
2016	A Streetcar Named Desire	Tennessee Williams	Stella Kowalski	St. Ann's Warehouse
2018	Julie	Polly Stenham	Julie	Royal National Theatre

=== Music videos ===
Year	Title	Artist	Role
2007	"The Heart Never Lies"	McFly	Female lead

=== Video games ===
Video game credits
Year	Title	Role	Notes	Ref.
2025	Fortnite Battle Royale	Sue Storm / Invisible Woman	Likeness	

=== Audiobooks ===
Year	Title	Author	ISBN	ASIN
2015	Romeo and Juliet (BBC Radio 3 full-cast dramatisation)	William Shakespeare		ASIN B00SSQ1DSG
2018	Ladybird Tales of Adventurous Girls	Julia Bruce	ISBN 9780241367407	ASIN B07G2JZ8BJ
2019	The Other Boleyn Girl	Philippa Gregory	ISBN 9781508292661	ASIN B07G2JZ8BJ
2021	The Virginia Woolf Collection	Virginia Woolf		ASIN B08XQW7M17
2021	Trouble with Lichen	John Wyndham	ISBN 9781038630445	ASIN B09M91BHBK
2022	Unmade Movies: Harold Pinter's Victory	Harold Pinter	ISBN 9781787533622	ASIN B09LHP9VCZ
2022	Morgan Is My Name	Sophie Keetch		ASIN B0BG8JZLVM
2024	Good Material	Dolly Alderton	ISBN 9780593907030	ASIN B0CL7M7NPH

== Awards and nominations ==
Vanessa Kirby awards and nominations
Awards and nominations
Award	Wins	Nominations
Academy Awards	0	1
BAFTA Awards	1	3
Critics' Choice Movie Awards	0	1
Golden Globe Awards	0	1
Primetime Emmy Awards	0	1
Screen Actors Guild Awards	0	3

Totals (Note: Certain award groups do not simply award one winner. They acknowledge several different recipients, have runners-up, and have third place. Since this is a specific recognition and is different from losing an award, runner-up mentions are considered wins in this award tally. For simplification and to avoid errors, each award in this list has been presumed to have had a prior nomination.)
- Wins: 7
- Nominations: 47

Year (Note: Indicates the year of ceremony. Each year is linked to the article about the awards held that year, wherever possible.)	Association	Category	Work	Result	Ref
2015	WhatsOnStage Awards	Best Supporting Actress in a Play	A Streetcar Named Desire	Won	
2017	British Academy Television Awards	Best Supporting Actress	The Crown	Nominated	
2017	Glamour Awards	UK TV Actress	The Crown	Won	
2017	Screen Actors Guild Awards	Outstanding Performance by an Ensemble in a Drama Series	The Crown	Nominated	
2018	British Academy Television Awards	Best Supporting Actress	The Crown	Won	
2018	Online Film and Television Association	Best Supporting Actress in a Drama Series	The Crown	Nominated	
2018	Primetime Emmy Awards	Outstanding Supporting Actress in a Drama Series	The Crown	Nominated	
2018	Screen Actors Guild Awards	Outstanding Performance by an Ensemble in a Drama Series	The Crown	Nominated	
2020	National Film Awards UK	Best Supporting Actress	Fast & Furious Presents: Hobbs & Shaw	Nominated	
2021	AACTA International Awards	Best International Actress	Pieces of a Woman	Nominated	
2021	Academy Awards	Best Actress	Pieces of a Woman	Nominated	
2021	Alliance of Women Film Journalists	Best Actress	Pieces of a Woman	Nominated	
2021	Alliance of Women Film Journalists	Most Daring Performance	Pieces of a Woman	Nominated	
2021	British Academy Film Awards	Best Actress in a Leading Role	Pieces of a Woman	Nominated	
2021	Critics' Choice Movie Awards	Best Actress	Pieces of a Woman	Nominated	
2021	Dallas–Fort Worth Film Critics Association	Best Actress	Pieces of a Woman	Nominated	
2021	Denver Film Critics Society	Best Actress	Pieces of a Woman	Nominated	
2021	Detroit Film Critics Society	Best Actress	Pieces of a Woman	Nominated	
2021	Georgia Film Critics Association	Best Actress	Pieces of a Woman	Nominated	
2021	Golden Globe Awards	Best Actress in a Motion Picture – Drama	Pieces of a Woman	Nominated	
2021	Hollywood Film Critics Association	Best Actress	Pieces of a Woman	Nominated	
2021	Houston Film Critics Society	Best Actress	Pieces of a Woman	Nominated	
2021	London Film Critics Circle Awards	Actress of the Year	Pieces of a Woman	Nominated	
2021	London Film Critics Circle Awards	British/Irish Actress of the Year	The World to Come	Nominated	
2021	Online Film and Television Association	Best Actress	Pieces of a Woman	Nominated	
2021	San Diego Film Critics Society	Best Actress	Pieces of a Woman	Nominated	
2021	San Diego Film Critics Society	Best Breakthrough Artist	Pieces of a Woman	Nominated	
2021	Santa Barbara Film Festival	Virtuoso Award	Pieces of a Woman	Won	
2021	Satellite Awards	Best Actress in a Motion Picture	Pieces of a Woman	Nominated	
2021	Screen Actors Guild Awards	Outstanding Performance by a Female Actor in a Leading Role	Pieces of a Woman	Nominated	
2021	St. Louis Film Critics Association	Best Actress	Pieces of a Woman	Nominated	
2021	Venice International Film Festival	Volpi Cup for Best Actress	Pieces of a Woman	Won	
2021	Washington D.C. Area Film Critics Association	Best Actress	Pieces of a Woman	Nominated	
2021	Women Film Critics Circle	Best Actress	Pieces of a Woman	Nominated	
2023	Sichuan TV Festival — International Gold Panda	Best Actress in a Supporting Role for a Motion Picture	The Son	Nominated	
2024	AACTA International Awards	Best International Supporting Actress	Napoleon	Won	
2026	Movieguide Awards	Movieguide Grace Award for Most Inspiring Performance	The Fantastic Four: First Steps	Nominated	
2026	Saturn Awards	Best Actress	The Fantastic Four: First Steps	Nominated	
2026	Critics' Choice Super Awards	Best Actress in a Superhero Movie	The Fantastic Four: First Steps	Nominated	
