= Atlantic Academy =

Location
- Bucks Cross, Bideford, Devon, EX39 5DW; England; 50.99549°N 4.404°W

Information
- Type: Free school
- Established: 2013
- Department for Education URN: 146567 Tables
- Ofsted: Reports
- Principal: Claire Ankers
- Gender: Mixed
- Age: 11 to 18
- Enrolment: 262 (February 2023)
- Website: atlanticacademy.uk

Atlantic Academy is a secondary academy situated in Bucks Cross in Bideford, Devon, England, and part of Athena Learning Trust. It was founded as Route 39 Academy, a free school. It has 262 pupils as of February 2023, and its current principal is Claire Ankers.

== History ==
=== Founding ===
The school was founded in 2011 by local parents as Route 39 Academy, a free school, It opened in September 2013, and was the first free school in Devon. The heads of other secondary schools in North Devon opposed it as an unnecessary expensiture of government funds, but Michael Gove, the then Secretary of State for Education, spoke in favour of it.

The school was temporarily situated in Clovelly Primary School's former building in Higher Clovelly. Purpose-built premises with a 700-pupil capacity were constructed at Steart Farm in Bucks Cross, Bideford. Plans to build the new school in this location were initially rejected by Torridge District Council, but the decision was overruled in February 2016.

=== Ofsted inadequate rating and rebranding ===
Ofsted first inspected Route 39 Academy in May 2015 and concluded it 'Requires Improvement', although some areas were rated 'Good'. However, a subsequent inspection in June 2017, when the school had 131 pupils, graded it as 'Inadequate' in all areas and placed it in special measures. One reason for the rating was that the school decided not to enter any of its Year 11 pupils for GCSE examinations in 2017, deeming the cohort "neither academically ready nor sufficiently mature or resilient" to take them.

Following the 2017 report and principal Jordan Kelly's unexplained departure later that year, the board of governors engaged Launceston College Multi-Academy Trust (now Athena Learning Trust) to assist with the running of the school to raise standards. The board's appeal against the Ofsted rating was denied, and in April 2018 the entire board resigned in objection to the takeover by the multi-academy trust, writing in a resignation letter that the trust's "traditional approach ... is ideologically opposed to that of the Route 39 founding vision".

The school was renamed to Atlantic Academy in August 2018, reopening that September in its new building. Ofsted rated the school 'Good' in February 2023, and in October 2023, now an academy, it was ranked most improved in Devon for GCSE results.
