= Duchy Hockey Club =

- Full name: Duchy Hockey Club
- Founded: 2009
- Ground: Pool Academy
- Chairman: Max Chippett
- League: Verde Recreo Hockey League (Men); West Club Women's Hockey League (Women)
Home colours	Away colours	Third colours

Duchy Hockey Club (informally Duchy HC) is a Cornish field hockey team based in Redruth, Cornwall, UK. As of 2018–19 the club are currently the newest hockey club in Cornwall, having been formed in January 2009. Duchy are the only hockey club based in the Camborne/Redruth conurbation. The club caters for both male and female players.

== History ==
Duchy HC was formed in 2009 by a group of local hockey enthusiasts with the intention of bringing club hockey back to the Camborne/Redruth area, following the demise, during the 1990s of CamReds HC and St. Agnes HC.

The club was initially formed with a Men's 1st XI, which competed in the West of England & South Wales Hockey League (currently known as the Verde Recreo Hockey League for sponsorship reasons) from the 2009–10 season.

As of the 2018–19 season, the club includes a Men's 1st XI, 2nd (A) XI and 3rd (B) XI; and a Women's 1st XI and 2nd (II) XI

== Club Crest and Colours ==
The club colours of black, white and gold are based upon the black-and-white flag of Saint Piran (the patron saint of Cornwall) and the black-and-gold coat of arms of the Duchy of Cornwall. The club crest comprises a modified flag of Saint Piran, overlain with a banner displaying the club name and the words "Est. 2009" referencing the date the club were formed.

The club home kit features predominantly black shirts with a white cross and gold trim, black shorts trimmed with white and gold, and black and white hooped socks. An alternative away kit with orange shirts trimmed with black, and orange socks is also in use.

== Home ground ==
Duchy HC play all their home fixtures on an AstroTurf all-weather pitch at Pool Academy (formerly Pool Business & Enterprise College) and commonly known as Pool School.

== Club honours ==
=== Men's 1st XI ===
West of England & South Wales Hockey League:

- South Western District Division 1: Champions 2009–10
- South West Division 1: Champions 2011–12
- Southern Division 1: Champions 2016–17

Cornwall Hockey Association Knockout Competitions:

- (2) Cornwall Cup: Champions 2014–15, 2015–16
- Cornwall Plate: Champions 2013–14
- Cornwall Pre-Season Tournament: 2018

=== Women's 1st XI ===
West Clubs' Women's Hockey League:

- Trelawney Division 2: Champions 2011–12

Cornwall Hockey Association Knockout Competitions:

- (4) Cornwall Plate: Champions 2012–13, 2013–14, 2015–16, 2017–18

=== Men's 2nd XI ===
West of England & South Wales Hockey League:

- South West Division 2: Champions 2012–13

Cornwall Hockey Association Knockout Competitions:

- Cornwall Plate: Champions 2014–15, 2017–18

=== Mixed XI ===
Cornwall Hockey Association Trophy:

- (2) Champions 2015–16, 2016–17

== Regional and County Level Player Honors ==
The following Duchy players have obtained senior regional or county-level honours:

- Max Chippett – Cornwall
- Tom Ettling – Devon & Cornwall O60s
- Will McKenzie – Cornwall
- Stuart Richardson – Cornwall
- Ricky Searle – Cornwall
- Lee Selby – West of England O40s
