= Bideford College =

Location
- Abbotsham Road; Bideford, Devon, EX39 3AR; England
- Coordinates: 51.01591°N 4.21919°W

Information
- Type: Academy
- Local authority: Devon
- Trust: Launceston College Multi Academy Trust
- Department for Education URN: 142540 Tables
- Ofsted: Reports
- Principal: Claire Ankers
- Gender: Mixed
- Age: 11 to 18
- Enrolment: 1,303
- Capacity: 1,744
- Website: bidefordcollege.org

Bideford College is a mixed secondary school and sixth form in Bideford in the English county of Devon. The principal is Claire Ankers.

== History ==
It is the only state-funded secondary school in Bideford.

On 28 June 2014 the then Secretary of State for Education, Michael Gove, visited the college.

Previously a foundation school administered by Devon County Council, the school converted to academy status in March 2016. The school is now part of the Athena Learning Trust, but continues to coordinate with Devon County Council for admissions.

== Site ==
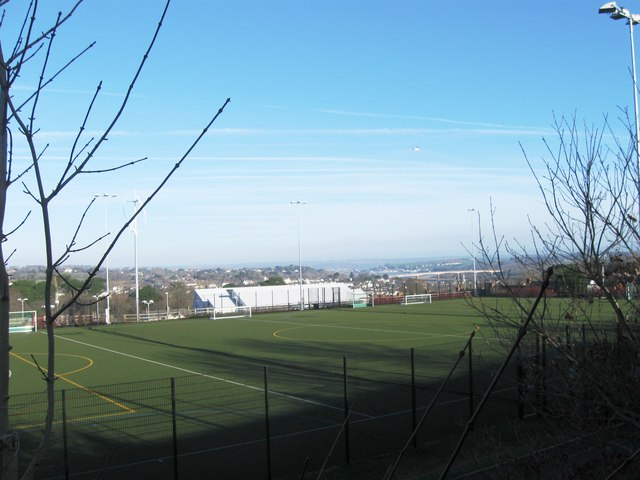
The artificial grass sports pitch at Bideford College.

In January 2006, the college won its bid to build a new multimillion-pound school site. Construction began in the summer of 2008 and the first phase was completed in 2010, ready for the start of the academic year in September. The second phase of the building, the outdoor sport pitches, was completed in July 2011. The £55 million new school was built on the old site and includes a media suite, library, sports hall, a hall known as 'The Devon Hall', and an artificial grass sports pitch. £32 million was funded from the Building Schools for the Future (BSF) programme.

== Academics ==
Bideford College offers GCSEs and BTECs as programmes of study for pupils, while students in the sixth form have the option to study from a range of A Levels, OCR Nationals and further BTECs.

== Performance and inspections ==
As of December 2024, students at GCSE make 'below average' progress according to the Government's Progress 8 benchmark.

As of February 2025, the school's most recent inspection by Ofsted was in 2022, with a judgement of Good. There were previous inspections in 2018, with a judgement of Requiring Improvement; 2015, with a judgement of Inadequate (special measures); and 2013, with a judgement of Requiring Improvement.

== Athena Learning Trust ==
In September 2022 the school joined the Athena Learning Trust.
