= Tom Bennett (author) =

British writer

Tom Bennett OBE
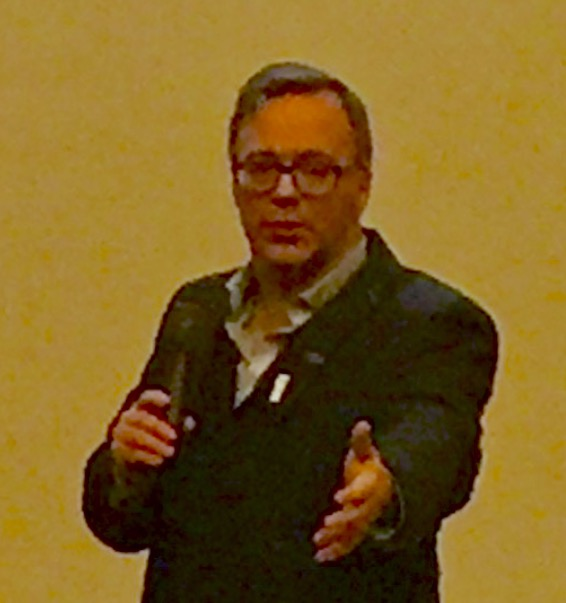
- Born: Glasgow, Scotland
- Occupation(s): Author, teacher
- Years active: 2010-present
- Website: Tom Bennett's blog

Thomas Bennett OBE is the founder and director of researchED, a non-profit organisation that runs teacher conferences about research and education. He is the author of several books on teacher training, the most successful of which is Running the Room: the teacher's guide to behaviour. In 2015 he was appointed the UK government's advisor on school behaviour, or ‘behaviour tsar,’ and is in charge of the Behaviour Hubs program.

Bennett is also a former nightclub manager on the Soho social scene, which he began when he moved to London in early adulthood. Following this he trained as a teacher of religious studies and philosophy, a career he pursued at inner-city schools in the East End of London for over a decade.

This formed the basis of his writing about teaching and classroom behaviour with the TES, where he became their online ‘Agony Uncle’ for behaviour. This led to the first of several books on the subject in 2010. In that year he was made a School teacher Fellow of Corpus Christi, the University of Cambridge.

He has since trained teachers internationally in behaviour and research. In 2013 he started researchED, is the editor of the quarterly researchED magazine, and since then has held events in five continents and thirteen countries. He regularly makes appearances on television and radio, promoting the work of both researchED and his behaviour role. 2015 he was long listed as one of the world's top teachers in the GEMS Global Teacher Prize. In the same year he made the Huffington Post's ‘Top Ten Global Bloggers’ list. He is also the Director of Tom Bennett Training.

Bennett was appointed Officer of the Order of the British Empire (OBE) in the 2022 New Year Honours for services to education.
