= Michaela Community School =

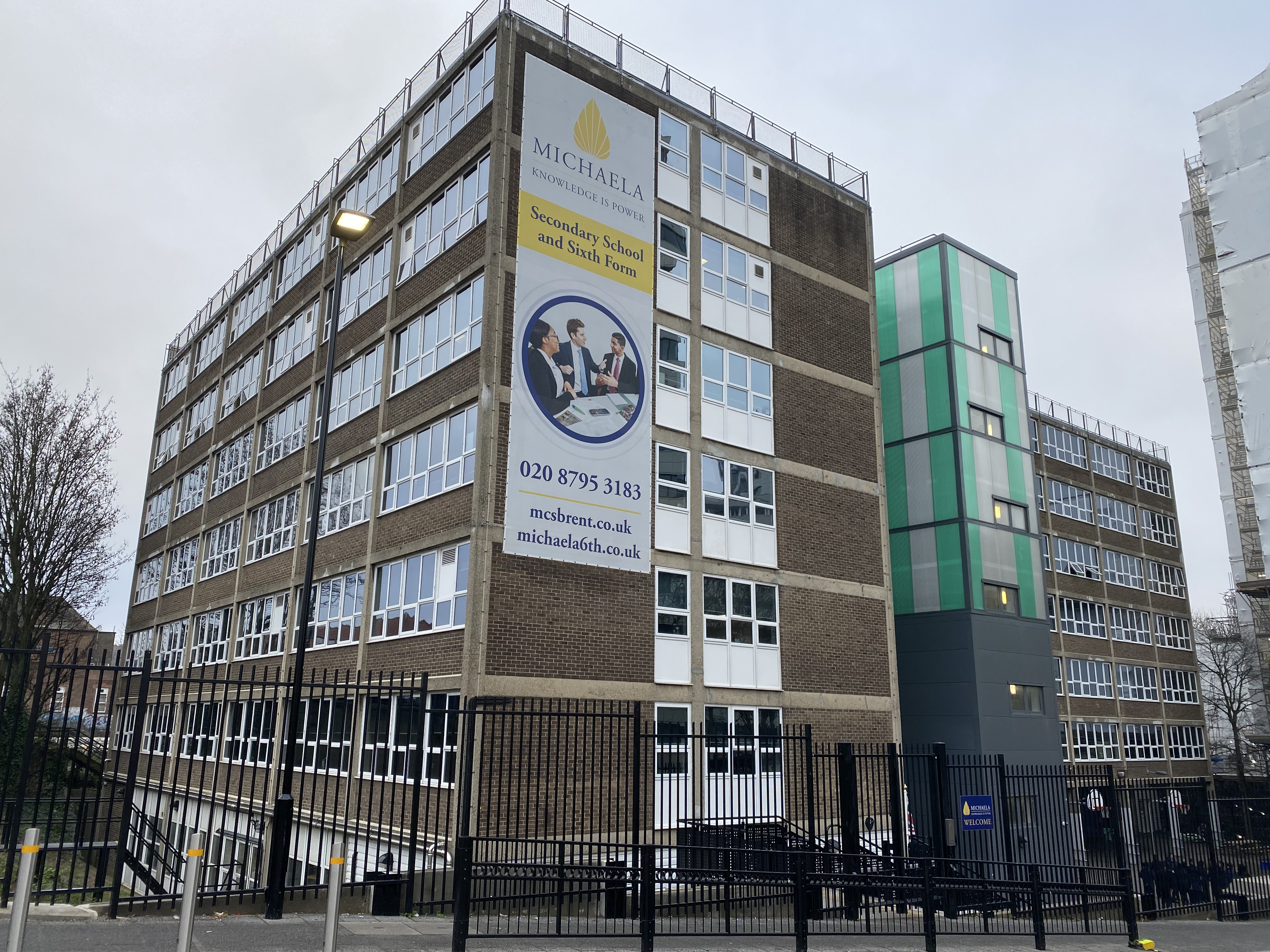

Location
- North End Road; Wembley, Greater London, HA9 0UU; England; 51°33′45″N 0°16′44″W

Information
- Other names: MCS; Michaela
- Type: Free school
- Mottoes: Knowledge is power; Work hard, be kind
- Established: September 2014
- Local authority: Brent London Borough Council
- Trust: Michaela Community School
- Department for Education URN: 140862 Tables
- Ofsted: Reports
- Headmistress: Katharine Birbalsingh
- Gender: Mixed
- Age range: 11–18
- Enrollment: 709 (2022)
- Capacity: 840
- Website: michaela.education

Michaela Community School (referred to as simply MCS or Michaela) is an 11–18 mixed, free secondary school and sixth form in Wembley, Greater London, England.

It was established in September 2014 with Katharine Birbalsingh as headteacher and Suella Braverman as the first chair of governors. It has been described as the "strictest school in Britain", and achieved among the best GCSE results in the nation among its first cohort of students. In 2022, 2023 and 2024 the value-added (progress) score at GCSE was the highest for any school in England.

== History ==
Michaela Community School was established in 2014 in a converted office block, described by the headteacher as "an awful building in comparison to most schools." It opened with 120 Year 7 pupils. It was named after Birbalsingh's former colleague Michaela Emanus, a West Indian teacher from Saint Lucia, who died of cancer in 2011. A number of figures associated with the Conservative Party were involved with establishing the school, including Suella Braverman.

The school was rated as "outstanding" in all categories by Ofsted in 2017 and 2023. In 2018, it applied to the Department for Education to open a second free school in Stevenage, with a planned opening in 2023. It was approved in 2019, and plans were submitted in 2022. Plans for the school were scrapped over a lack of basic need. In 2024 it was revealed that £1.2 million had been spent by the Department of Education on the project before it was scrapped.

The school has been called "contentious" and received significant media attention. It has been described as having an ethos generally associated with pre-1960s or private schools and for a time marketed itself as "Private School Ethos—No Fees". One commentator described the school as an example of a discipline-focused method of teaching children becoming increasingly popular in the UK.

A documentary about the school entitled "Britain's Strictest Headmistress" was broadcast on ITV in 2022.

The school has been described as a beneficiary of former UK Education secretary Michael Gove's support, both financially and bureaucratically.

== Policies ==
The school emphasises discipline and has a traditional style of teaching. There is a "zero tolerance" policy regarding poor behaviour. A "boot camp" week at the start of the year teaches the new year 7 pupils the rules and the consequences of breaking them. There is a strict uniform code and no group work. Children sit in rows, learn by rote and walk in single file between classrooms. Staff at the school "tend to reject most of the accepted wisdoms of the 21st century." Pupils must be silent in school corridors and are forbidden to gather in groups larger than four. The school policies have been described as "neo-strict" because it combines the use of punishments with rewards; "merit points" are given for good behaviour and achievement.

Pupils write several essays a year, memorise poems, and read five Shakespeare plays in three years. The school aims to teach a "culture of kindness", which includes helping each other and their families, and offering adults their seats on buses and the Tube.

In March 2023, in response to pupils praying in the yard, the school introduced a ban on "prayer rituals", stating that allowing prayers risked "undermining inclusion and social cohesion between pupils'. A Muslim pupil subsequently sued the school on discrimination and human rights grounds. In April 2024 the High Court upheld the ban on appeal. The school's founder and head teacher Katharine Birbalsingh said the ruling was a "victory for all schools".

=== Lunch ===
Lunchtime consists of a pescatarian meal described as a "family lunch". Pupils sit at tables of six, with one teacher or guest, and take responsibility for serving each other. They lay the table together. One pours water. Another brings in and serves the food. Another serves dessert. Two clear the table following the meal. Teachers eat with their students, and the tables discuss what the children have learned that day, or a topic of the day such as the most inspirational person they have learned about in their history classes. After eating, the pupils spend five minutes thanking someone, followed by two claps from the rest of the school. The school believes that by teaching gratitude, it teaches kindness and happiness.

The school charges £2.50 per day for a two-course lunch, as well as morning and afternoon snacks; families eligible for free school meals are reimbursed. Children are not allowed to bring food or drink to school, which includes snacks and chewing gum. There was criticism in July 2016 when it was discovered families who were errant in paying had their children held in "lunch isolation" where pupils eat and do schoolwork in a separate room for the full lunchtime. The school upholds the practice as part of its focus on personal responsibility, and reports that no child is left without lunch.

== Academic profile ==
In its first set of GCSE results in August 2019, half of the pupils who sat exams got Grade 7 or above in at least five subjects and almost a quarter got Grade 7 or better in all their subjects. Overall 18% of entries received grade 9, the highest grade, compared to 4.5% nationwide. In maths, one entry in four achieved grade 9. The school's Progress 8 benchmark score placed it fifth nationally.In 2022 and 2023, Michaela achieved the highest Progress 8 scores in the country. In 2021, the first A-Level cohort, 82% of the school's students were offered places at Russell Group universities.

The school has received coverage for its policies and academic results. In September 2019, the school was cited by Education Secretary Gavin Williamson as "an example of a free school in a tough area that had achieved excellent results". In November, it was praised by Andreas Schleicher, coordinator of the OECD Programme for International Student Assessment (PISA). In December, the school was selected by The Good Schools Guide as one of its "12 Schools of Christmas", describing it as "Not for the faint hearted, the cynical or the fragile. Strict, but with a warm heart beating below the surface, Michaela creates a safe, but stimulating environment, and the chance to fly."

In April 2022, the school's headteacher gave evidence in front of the House of Commons Science and Technology Select Committee. Her comment on the under-representation of girls doing physics at A-Level and university sparked controversy amongst equality activists. She stated that, "Physics isn't something girls tend to fancy." She also stated that "I just don't think they like it. There's a lot of hard maths in there that I think they'd rather not do." In response to the controversy, Melanie Phillips in a comment piece for The Times clarified that Birbalsingh was talking only about girls at Michaela Community School, where only 16% of A-Level Physics students were girls.

== Publications ==
A book written by teachers at the school, Battle Hymn of the Tiger Teachers, published in 2016, describes Michaela's teaching methods. A second book, Michaela: The Power of Culture, was published in 2020.

== Notable staff ==
- Katharine Birbalsingh, co-founder and current headmistress
- Joe Kirby, co-founder and education blogger

== See also ==
- Didactic method
- Knowledge organiser
