= American Educator =

- Discipline: Education
- Language: English

Publication details
- History: 1977–present
- Frequency: Quarterly

Standard abbreviations
- ISO 4: Am. Educ.

Indexing
- ISSN: 0148-432X (print); 2770-4432 (web)

American Educator is a quarterly journal published by the American Federation of Teachers focusing on various issues about children and education. In mid-2011, its total circulation was over 900,000.

Recent authors include E. D. Hirsch Jr., Diane Ravitch, Richard W. Riley, Daniel T. Willingham and William Julius Wilson. The journal is indexed by the United States Department of Education's Education Resources Information Center.

== History ==
American Educator was first published in the winter of 1977.
