= Daniel T. Willingham =

American cognitive psychologist

- Born: 1961 (age 64–65)
- Alma mater: Harvard University (PhD), Duke University (BA)
- Scientific career
- Fields: Cognitive psychology
- Workplaces: University of Virginia
- Thesis: Memory Systems and Mechanisms of Motor Skill Learning (1990)
- Doctoral advisors: William Kaye Estes; Stephen Kosslyn
- Website: www.danielwillingham.com

Daniel T. Willingham (born 1961) is a psychologist at the University of Virginia, where he is a professor in the Department of Psychology. Willingham's research focuses on the application of findings from cognitive psychology and neuroscience to K–12 education.

Willingham earned his BA from Duke University and his PhD under William Kaye Estes and Stephen Kosslyn in cognitive psychology from Harvard University. During the 1990s and into the early 2000s, his research focused on the brain mechanisms supporting learning, the question of whether different forms of memory are independent of one another and how these hypothetical systems might interact.

Since 2002, Willingham has written the "Ask the Cognitive Scientist" column for the American Educator published by the American Federation of Teachers. In 2009, he published Why Don't Students Like School, which received positive coverage in The Wall Street Journal and The Washington Post.

Willingham is known as a proponent of the use of scientific knowledge in classroom teaching and in education policy. He has sharply criticized learning styles theories as unsupported and has cautioned against the empty application of neuroscience in education. He has advocated for teaching students scientifically proven study habits, and for a greater focus on the importance of knowledge in driving reading comprehension.

In his book "Why Don't Students Like School?" he provides nine fundamental principles that can help teachers understand how students' minds work and improve their approach to teaching. He suggests that it is more useful to view the human species as bad at thinking, rather than cognitively gifted. He argues that the brain is not primarily designed for thinking through decisions; rather, it's designed to save you from having to do that. Because thinking is slow, effortful, and uncertain, we rely on memory for the vast majority of decisions we make. While memory is not always reliable, on balance it is much more effective than having to stop and think about every step of every decision you need to make (for example, when driving a car). He also suggests that, even though our brains are not very good at thinking, we actually like to think. While humans are naturally curious, the conditions have to be just right for curiosity to take hold (not too easy, not too hard). This idea is similar to Vygotsky's zone of proximal development (for example, a joke is funnier when you understand it without needing it to be explained). He suggests that this is because of the dopamine released by the brain's natural reward system whenever we solve a problem.

== Books ==
- Cognition: The Thinking Animal (4 editions: 2001, 2004, 2007, 2019: Prentice Hall, Cambridge University Press)
- Current Directions in Cognitive Science (Ed., with Barbara Spellman: 2005: Prentice Hall)
- Why Don't Students Like School?: A Cognitive Scientist Answers Questions About How the Mind Works and What It Means for the Classroom (2 editions 2009, 2020: Jossey-Bass)
- When Can You Trust the Experts?: How to Tell Good Science from Bad in Education (2012: Jossey-Bass)
- Raising Kids Who Read: What Parents and Teachers Can Do (2015: Jossey-Bass)
- The Reading Mind: A Cognitive Approach to Understanding How the Mind Reads (2017: Jossey-Bass)
- Outsmart Your Brain: Why Learning is Hard and How You Can Make It Easy (2023: Gallery Books)

== Articles ==
- Students Remember. . . What They Think About. American Educator, Summer 2003.
- Reframing the Mind. Education Next, Summer 2004.
- The Myth of Learning Styles. Change, September–October 2010.
- Critical Thinking: Why Is It So Hard to Teach? American Educator, Summer 2007.
- How educational theories can use neuroscientific data. Mind, Brain, and Education, 1, 140–149. (With John Lloyd)
- 21st century skills: The challenges ahead. Educational Leadership, #67, 16–21. (With Andrew Rotherham)
- Unlocking the Science of How Kids Think. EducationNext, Summer 2018.
