= Launceston College, Cornwall =

Launceston College
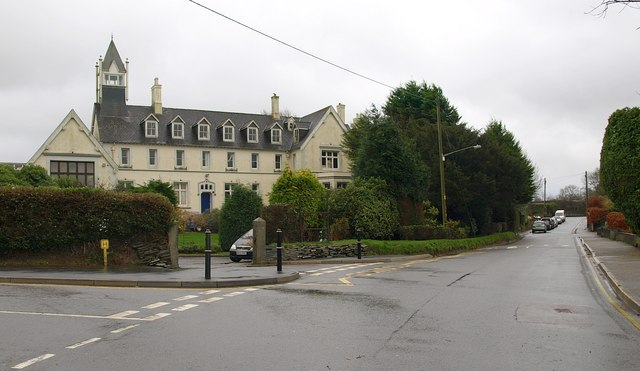
- Dunheved House at Launceston College

Location
- Hurdon Rd; Launceston, Cornwall, PL15 9JR; England; 50.629°N 4.360°W

Information
- Type: Academy
- Established: 1409
- Trust: Athena Learning Trust
- Department for Education URN: 139155 Tables
- Ofsted: Reports
- Principal: Matthew Thompson
- Gender: Coeducational
- Age: 11 to 18
- Enrolment: 1,322
- Colour: Navy Blue White
- Website: www.launceston-college.cornwall.sch.uk

Launceston College is a coeducational comprehensive secondary school and sixth form with academy status, located in Launceston, Cornwall, England. It is the parent school of Athena Learning Trust.

== History ==
The current Launceston College can be traced back to a boys' grammar school with boarding house established in 1409. During its history it was known as both Launceston Grammar School and Launceston Free School. In 1931 Launceston College came into existence (as a boys' school) through the merger of Horwell Grammar School (located in Newport, Launceston) and Dunheved College. In 1962, Horwell Grammar School for Girls, located at Hendra House, Dunheved Road merged with the college. In 1965 the former Pennygillam secondary modern school was added to form the present day comprehensive school, which retains the name Launceston College.

Since some time in the 19th century the college has been located at the southern end of Dunheved Road, approximately one kilometre from the town centre. It was designated a Technology College in 1998, and converted to academy status in 2013. The logo of the college is based on Launceston Castle, a major landmark in the town. It is now fully inclusive and educates students aged 11 to 18 or 19.

In 1966 H. Spencer Toy, its then principal, published A History of Education at Launceston detailing the development of education in the town and surrounding area.

The college underwent a significant expansion in 2023, with the addition of a new general teaching and science block designed by Poynton Bradbury Architects.

== Athena Learning Trust ==
The school is governed by Athena Learning Trust, formerly Launceston College Multi-Academy Trust, a multi-academy trust with three primary schools and five other secondary schools which was incorporated at Launceston College in 2012 and has its headquarters there at Dunheved House.

Athena Learning Trust has received criticism from parents over its strict discipline regime.. In May 2026, its CEO, Ben Parnell, announced that he would be stepping down, and in July 2026, the trust announced that it will dissolve and is working with the Department for Education to identify alternative trusts to which the schools can be transferred.

== Notable former pupils ==
- Charles Causley, Cornish poet and writer (born in Launceston).
- Donald Fear and Davyth Fear, winners on 'Who wants to be a millionaire?'
- Roger Moore, British actor (educated during World War II following evacuation from Battersea).
- Albert Sloman, first Vice-Chancellor of the University of Essex
- Alan Tuckett, educationalist.
