= Knowledge organiser =

Educational template

A knowledge organiser is an educational template on a single A4 sheet consisting of grids, each with a term and a short explanation, making it clear to the student as to what is essential to learn. Each grid has an overall theme, and these vary according to the subject being taught. The term became well known throughout social media, and its creation and popularity has been credited to previous Michaela Community School teacher, Joe Kirby.

== Origins and use ==
In 2015, Michaela Community School teacher, Joe Kirby, wrote a blog detailing the value of listing, on one side of A4 paper, key points to learn. He called the template a knowledge organiser.

To construct a knowledge organiser, the unit of study and the content requiring to be taught needs to be identified. Subsequently, around five to ten key points based on the key areas are documented on one column and their definition in the opposite column.

Swindon Academy collates all the knowledge organisers for each year group and set into a termly booklet, allowing parents and student to be informed of future work.

Individually-tailored knowledge organisers may be more useful in subjects such as history rather than English. The method has increased in use by a number of teachers, who can then clarify what is important to learn.

== See also ==
- Leitner System
