= Katharine Birbalsingh =

British teacher (born 1973)

Katharine Birbalsingh CBE
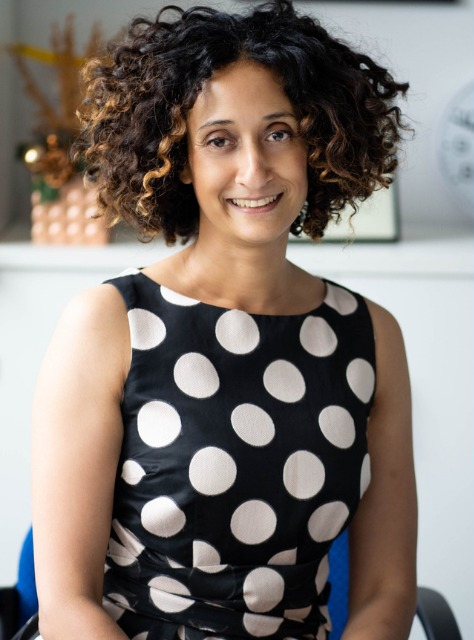
- Government portrait, 2021
- Born: Katharine Moana Birbalsingh; 16 September 1973 (age 53); Auckland, New Zealand
- Other names: Miss Snuffy; Katharine Bing
- Education: New College, Oxford (BA)
- Occupation: Head teacher
- Employers: Michaela Community School; Social Mobility Commission; Dunraven School
- Awards: Contrarian Prize (2019)
- Website: www.gov.uk/government/people/katharine-birbalsingh

Katharine Moana Birbalsingh CBE (born 16 September 1973) is an education reform advocate and the founder and head teacher of Michaela Community School, a free school established in 2014 in Wembley Park, London.

The daughter of an Indo-Guyanese academic and a Jamaican nurse, Birbalsingh was born in New Zealand and raised in Canada until she was 15, when she moved to England. She cultivated an interest in education when reading French and philosophy at New College, Oxford and, after graduating, went into teaching at state schools in south London. She began writing a blog, To Miss with Love, in 2007 under the name Miss Snuffy, and later offered her support to the education policies of the Conservative Party and the reforms made by Michael Gove as Education Secretary. She has said that she holds small-c conservative values.

Birbalsingh is the author of three books, Singleholic (2009), To Miss with Love (2011), and Diversity is not Our Strength (2026), and editor of Battle Hymn of the Tiger Teachers: The Michaela Way (2016) and Michaela: The Power of Culture (2020). She was appointed Commander of the Order of the British Empire (CBE) in the 2020 Birthday Honours. In October 2021, Birbalsingh was appointed chair of the Social Mobility Commission.

== Education and early life ==
Birbalsingh was born in 1973 in Auckland, New Zealand. She is the elder of two daughters of Frank Birbalsingh, a Canadian (York University) literature academic of Indo-Guyanese origin, and his wife, Norma, a nurse from Jamaica.

Birbalsingh grew up mostly in Toronto and was educated at Victoria Park Collegiate Institute, with brief periods in Nigeria and France, and moved to England when she was 15, when her father began lecturing in English literature at the University of Warwick. She graduated from the University of Oxford after reading French and philosophy at New College. At university she was a member of the Socialist Workers Party.

== Career ==
=== Teaching ===
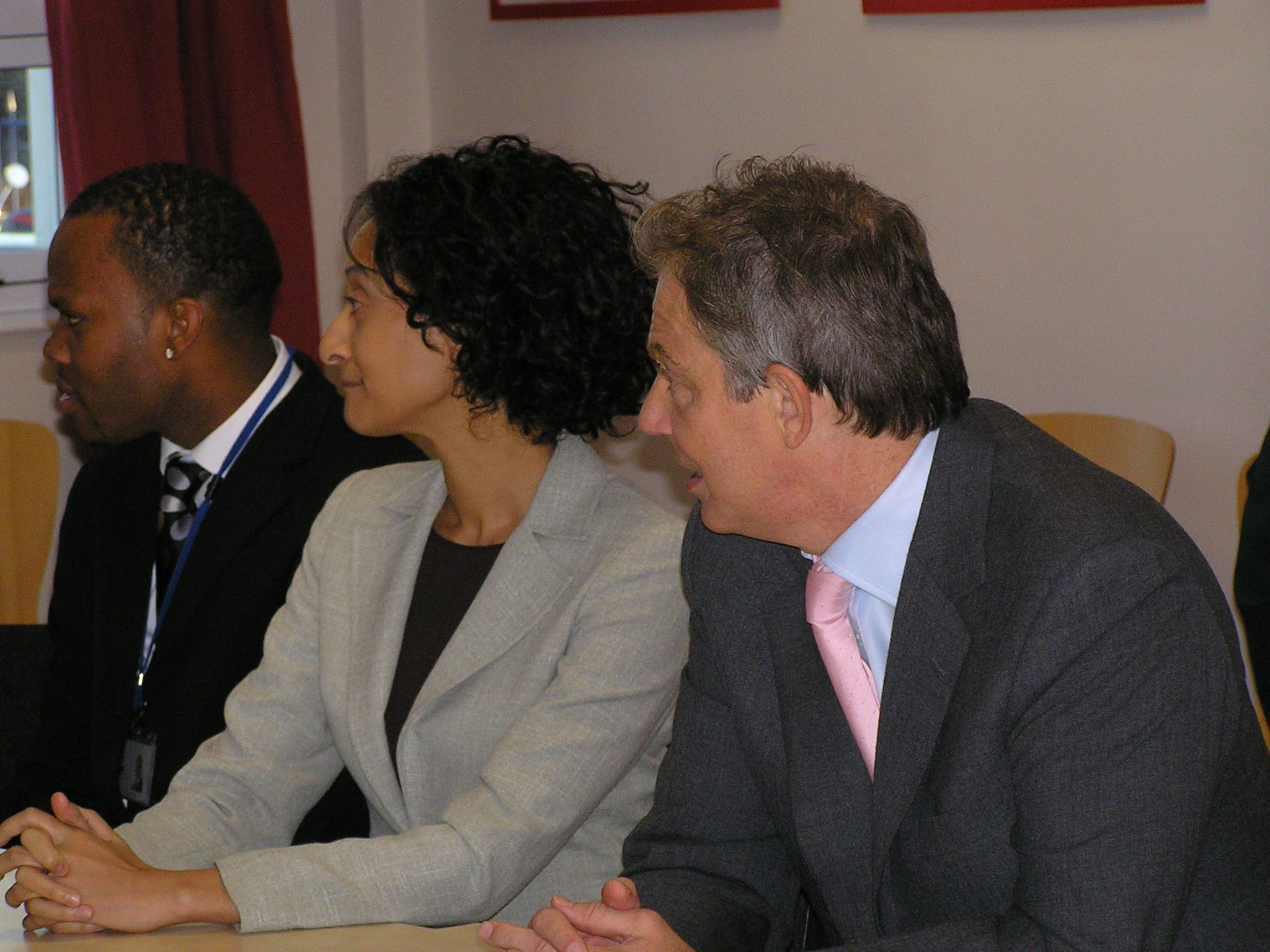
Birbalsingh (centre) with prime minister Tony Blair (right) at Dunraven School in 2005

While at Oxford, Birbalsingh had visited inner-city schools as part of a scheme the university runs to encourage state-school pupils to apply, and after graduation she decided to teach in state schools herself. From 2007 she wrote an anonymous blog, To Miss With Love, in which—as Miss Snuffy—she described her experiences teaching at an inner-city secondary school. In 2010 she was the assistant head of Dunraven School, Streatham, south London, and that year she joined St Michael and All Angels Academy in Camberwell, also south London, as vice-principal. In 2014, she established Michaela Community School, a free school in Wembley Park, London.

Birbalsingh is a supporter of the traditional teaching methods described in E. D. Hirsch's The Schools We Need and Why We Don't Have Them (1999). She writes that the book "opened [her] eyes" to what was wrong in schools, and argues that education should be about teaching children knowledge, not learning skills. Responding to the removal of Michael Gove as education secretary in 2014—Gove was also a supporter of Hirsch—she said it was a tragedy that his work would not be completed.

=== Conservative Party conference ===
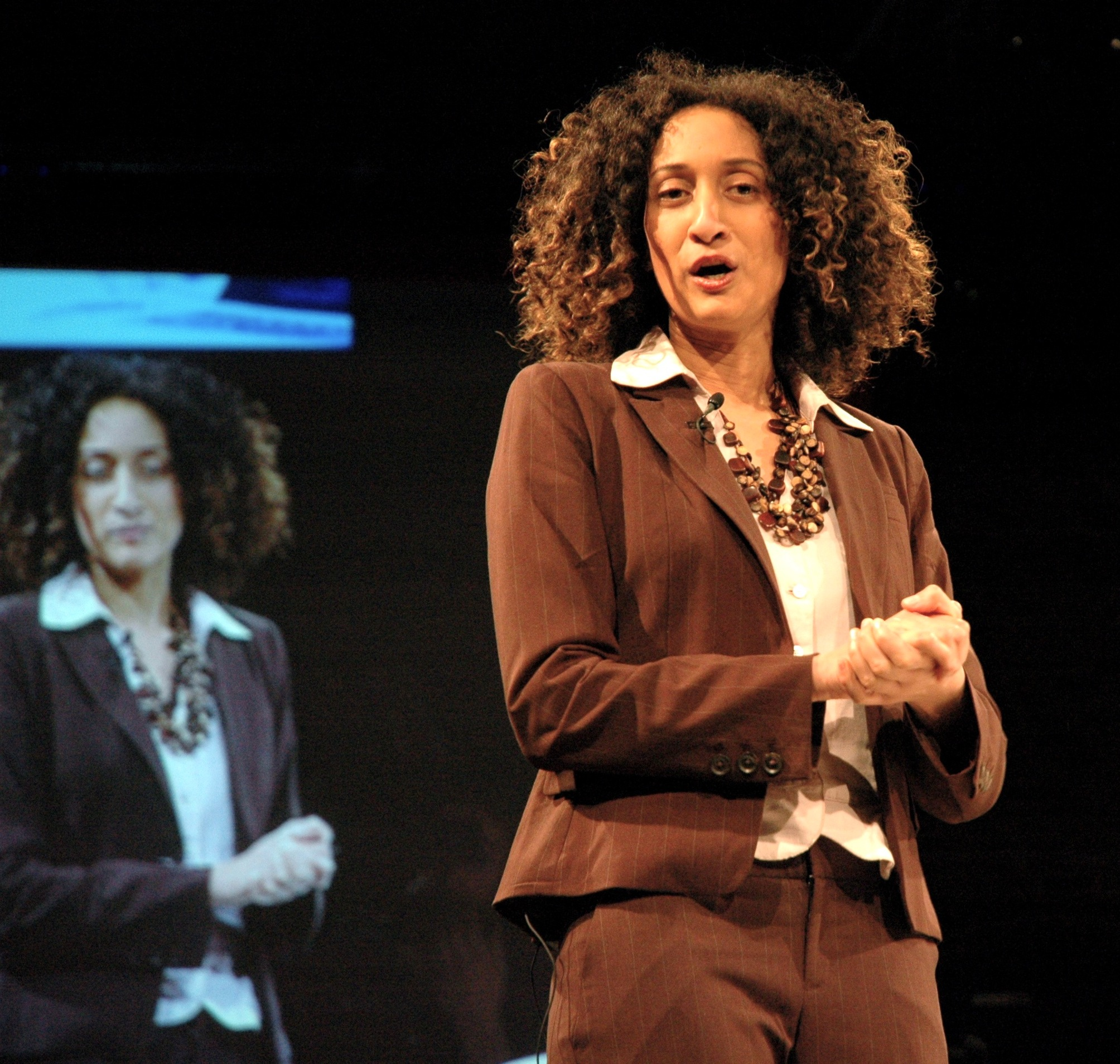
Birbalsingh in 2011

Birbalsingh came to national prominence in October 2010 after criticising the British education system at that year's Conservative Party conference, and speaking in support of the party's education policies. Referring to a "culture of excuses, of low standards ... a sea of bureaucracy ... [and] the chaos of our classrooms", Birbalsingh told the conference: "My experience of teaching for over a decade in five different schools has convinced me beyond a shadow of a doubt that the system is broken, because it keeps poor children poor." Following this, she says she became the target of racist and sexist abuse on social media. After the speech Birbalsingh was asked not to attend the school at which she taught while the governors "discuss[ed] her position". She subsequently resigned "after being asked to comply with conditions that she did not feel able to comply with", according to The Sunday Telegraph. The school, St Michael and All Angels in Camberwell, London, was closed shortly thereafter and reopened with new staff and a new name.

=== Publications ===
Birbalsingh's first publication was a novel, Singleholic (2009), published under the pseudonym "Katherine Bing". Her second book, To Miss with Love (2011), was based on her blog. It was chosen as Book of the Week and serialised on BBC Radio 4. Her third book, Diversity is not Our Strength, was published in 2026. She is also the editor of Battle Hymn of the Tiger Teachers: The Michaela Way (2016) and Michaela: The Power of Culture (2020), which describe the education philosophy of Michaela Community School.

=== Social Mobility Commission ===
In October 2021 Birbalsingh was appointed Chair of the Social Mobility Commission in succession to Martina Milburn. She retained her position at Michaela. Liz Truss, Minister for Women and Equalities, stated that "By expecting high standards and not indulging the soft bigotry of low expectations she is producing amazing results at Michaela school and giving children the best chance in life. She will bring that same attitude to the Commission and be a loud champion of equality of opportunity." Birbalsingh was criticised for comments she made in April 2022 regarding young women not pursuing physics, stating that "physics isn't something that girls tend to fancy. They don't want to do it, they don't like it... I just think they don't like it. There's a lot of hard maths in there that I think they would rather not do... the research generally … just says that's a natural thing,". Birbalsingh responded to some of these comments in an article in The Daily Telegraph. She resigned the position in January 2023, saying "I want to be able to speak publicly about what I think is right and not worry that I am bringing the SMC into disrepute".

=== Subsequent activism ===
In 2023, the New Statesman named her as the 45th most influential right-wing figure in British politics.

Birbalsingh was criticised in 2023 for banning Muslim prayers from her school, saying they were divisive and disruptive.

She attended the 2023 National Conservatism Conference. In her speech, she placed schools at the forefront of the fight for conservative values and culture. She urged conservative parents to remove their children from schools that were "too woke". She alleged that "there are kids right now, in some schools, with tails pinned to their heads and bottoms.. They identify as cats, you see."

== Political views ==
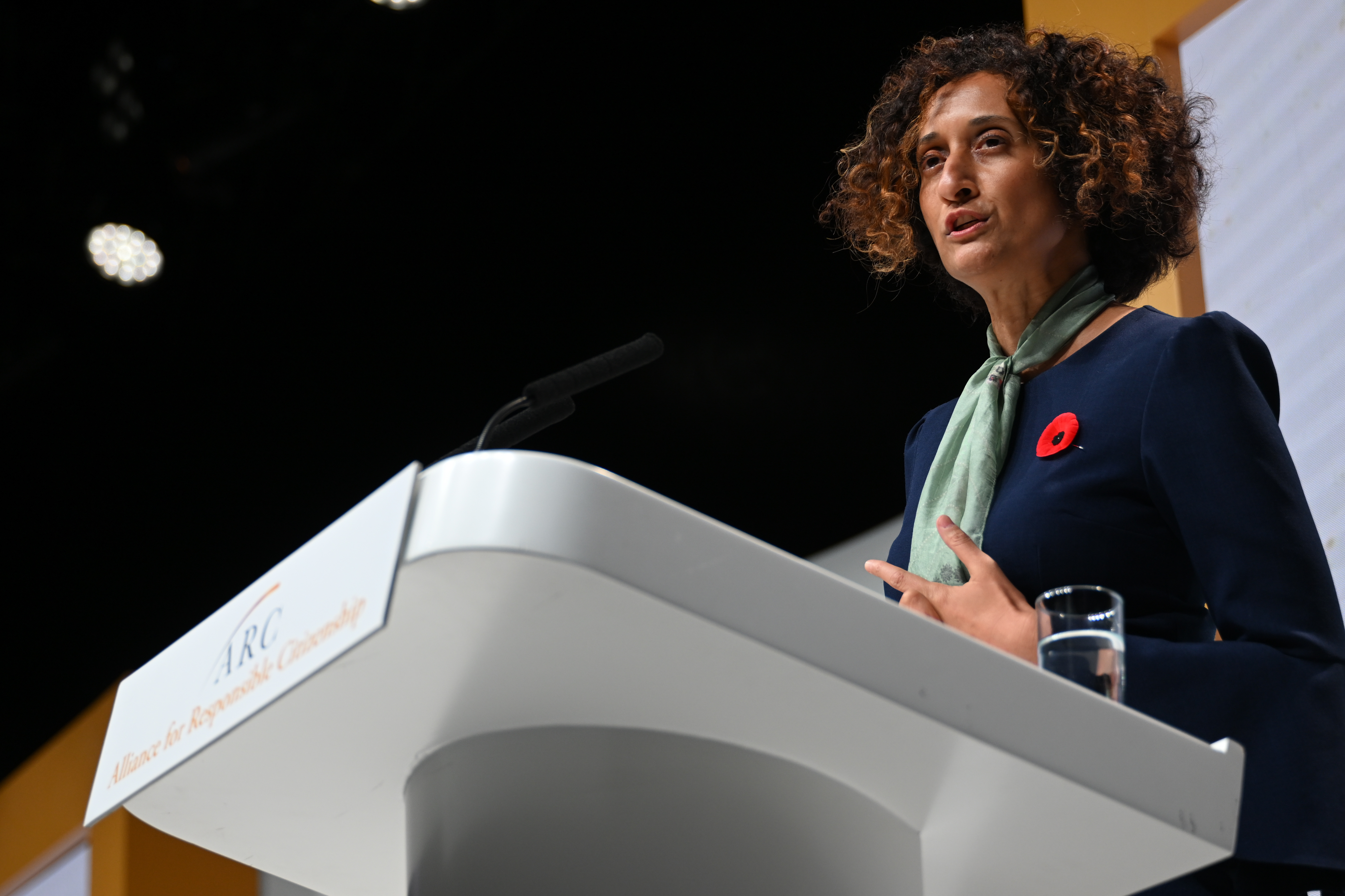
Katharine Birbalsingh addresses Alliance for Responsible Citizenship 1 November 2023

Birbalsingh describes her views as being small-c conservative and argues such traditional values "which would once have been completely normal have completely disappeared." She maintains that misguided progressive politics in schools have held ethnic minority and working-class children back from academic success and that the political left seek to address problems within education by pouring more money into schools rather than fixing deeper issues, stating "there is a lot of power in ideas, and if the ideas are wrong, then the education system will not deliver."

In an interview with Nick Robinson, Birbalsingh said that she previously identified as being on the political left at university but formed many of her current views through teaching in inner-city state schools and seeing the contrast between state school pupils and the educational opportunities of her fellow students at Oxford. She argued that her experiences working as a teacher in deprived areas led her to believe that the state education sector encouraged a "culture of excuses and low standards" with regard to discipline and quality.

Birbalsingh maintains that children of black and ethnic minority backgrounds are not sufficiently taught about British culture or Britishness in schools which has left them feeling "culturally excluded". She argues that such cultural exclusion happens due to teachers placing more emphasis on the ethnicity of children than on promoting British national identity, stating, "Teachers would tell them all the time they weren't part of the country—they say what country are you really from? Let's do a cultural thing where we all bring in our flags. The people who are doing this think they're being nice. They think they're being respectful" but that children "didn't get taught about Shakespeare and Dickens—or that they were part of their country."

Birbalsingh has argued that teenagers should be prevented from having mobile phones in school as their brains are not developed enough for them to exercise proper self-control. She has likewise advocated "digital drop-off" schemes, where children and parents were encouraged to bring in electronic devices to be locked in a school safe for the holidays.

Birbalsingh has said that children used the "race card" when in disputes with teachers, and warned parents to take their children's claims of "racism" with a pinch of salt when they are disciplined at school. She also claimed that young black students were being held back from success in school by teachers who "are scared of being called racist" if they discipline them.

Birbalsingh has advocated the singing of patriotic songs such as "I Vow To Thee My Country" or "Jerusalem" in school assemblies, saying that they make teenagers feel proud to be British.

In response to the Black Lives Matter (BLM) protests in the United Kingdom, following the murder of George Floyd, Birbalsingh stated that education and instilling a sense of belonging is the way to make a real difference for black families. She has argued that the killing of Floyd was unjustified, and that white Britons have avoided serious conversations about racism, and that this in turn has drawn people to BLM. However, she is strongly critical of the tactics of the Black Lives Matter movement itself, arguing that it undermines the teaching of children to take personal responsibility, encourages violence, and exacerbates racism by making debates harder and encouraging black teenagers to focus on identity politics or victimhood. She has also rejected BLM's claims that British schools do not teach about slavery and black history, stating that poor teaching and lack of discipline in classrooms has meant that lessons on these subjects are improperly communicated and not committed to memory, and that the BLM movement narrows slavery down to the transatlantic slave trade and not other examples of slavery from history.

Birbalsingh has maintained that using the term "white privilege" is unhelpful to ethnic minority students, as it creates an exaggerated perception that they are perpetually oppressed by the political establishment, and diminishes incentives to work hard. Birbalsingh instead maintains that factors such as the quality of schools, discipline, teaching and parental support at home are more likely to shape the outcome of a pupil's success over race, and that emphasis on race or culture wars distracts politicians from these issues. In a 2021 debate hosted by the Henry Jackson Society, Birbalsingh also asserted her opposition to what she described as the growth of "woke culture" in education, arguing that it is more concerned with "making children into revolutionaries" and inserting political bias into classes over instilling values such as kindness, tolerance and hard work.

In 2025, she described the education policies of the Starmer Labour government as "cultural Marxism." Of education secretary Bridget Phillipson, she said, "She believes in imposing quality from the central state. She is a cultural Marxist."

== Awards and honours ==
In 2017, Birbalsingh was included by Anthony Seldon in his list of the 20 most influential figures in British education, and in 2019 she was awarded the Contrarian Prize. She was appointed Commander of the Order of the British Empire (CBE) in the 2020 Birthday Honours for services to education. She was elected an honorary fellow of New College, Oxford in 2021.

Barbalsingh is the subject of a documentary "Britain's Strictest Headmistress," which aired in 2022 on ITV. It was produced by Riverdog Productions, with Nell Butler as the producer.
