= Multi-academy trust =

Trust in England operating multiple academy schools

Multi-Academy Trust (MAT) or academy chain is an academy trust that operates more than one academy school. Academy schools are state-funded schools in England which are directly funded by the Department for Education and independent of local authority control. The terms of the arrangements are set out in individual Academy Funding Agreements. The group of schools in a multi-academy trust work together under a shared academy funding agreement.

BESA, the British Educational Suppliers Association states that in November 2019 there are 1,170 Multi Academy Trusts in England that manage at least two schools: 598 have five or fewer schools, 259 have 6-11 schools, 85 have between 12-25 schools and 29 have 26 or more schools.

== History ==
The Education Act 1944 established a national system of primary and secondary education, with schools under the overall supervision of ‘local education authorities’ who were responsible for funding all such schools. This legal called maintaining then in 1988 schools gained legal autonomy.

Sponsored academies were introduced from the early 2000s by the Labour government. The sponsor paid the capital cost and the revenue costs were paid by central government. A sponsor set up a charitable trust and individual contracts were signed with the Department for Education (DfE). These were all schools that had been failed the Ofsted criteria. By 2010 there were 203 such schools, out of a total 3333.

The Academies Act 2010 was passed by the incoming Conservative Government, It provided a bespoke statutory mechanism for maintained schools, both primary and secondary, to be forced or allowed to ‘convert’ to academy status. The DfE adopted various ‘model funding agreements’ for new academies. New academies called ‘free schools’ could be built. A local authority needing to build new school in its area had to seek proposals to establish an academy, in the form of a ‘free school’. They were no longer allowed to construct it themselves.

In 2014, eight Regional Schools Commissioners (RSCs) were appointed as DfE civil servants. with the responsibility for approving new academies and intervening to address performance issues in academies. They have significant powers to influence to academies and local authority maintained schools.

The academy trust model of governance was the one imposed on all:

- sponsored academies when they were forced to leave local authority control, i.e. schools deemed to be failing by central government. It was considered that the governors of such schools were failing, so the existing governing body was dissolved and replaced by a structure determined by an external sponsor. The sponsor could be a charity, philanthropist, FE College or, or another academy.
- Converter academies, schools who have chosen to convert, have increasingly chosen to join existing academy chains rather than find their own sponsors. The Umbrella Trust is an alternative structure for converter schools that is less used, where the schools maintain more local control.
- A third model is the Collaborative Partnership where the academies are directly answerable to the Secretary of State but not to each other. This is rare.

By 2017, the concept of academy chain was in retreat, the multi-academy trust was the predominant model of governance. The MAT contracts with the Secretary of State directly and schools run by a MAT have no separate legal identity. Each school is, in law, simply the local site through which the MAT delivers the central contract. Local staff and any local ‘governing body’ have only the role assigned to them by the MAT board itself

== Governance ==
There is one central board of directors, who may call themselves the board of governors. The majority are appointed by the sponsor. They appoint the executive head teacher, and run the back-office services such as building, human resources and allocation of special fund. They may govern all the schools centrally or appoint local governing bodies with defined delegated powers which act as subcommittees to the central board.

=== Accountability ===
The board of directors originally were responsible to the Secretary of State for Education, through the National Schools Commissioner. In September 2014 eight Regional Schools Commissioners (RSCs) were formally appointed as civil servants within the Department for Education(DfE); were given responsibility for intervening in under-performing academies in their region and approving new free schools. Their role was expanded in July 2015 to approve converter academies and assign sponsors. It remained unclear exactly what the limits to the role of Regional School Commissioner were and how they related to the elected Headteachers Board (HTB), to the Local Authorities, to Ofsted and the local community. Ofsted is a separate government department not answerable to the DfE. The regional commissioners ran shadow inspections of schools and trust, bypassing Ofsted. On the strength of these, they informed headteachers that their schools were failing and must apply to become academies and join an academy chain. In effect there were two inspection regimes: the education minister Damian Hinds told the 2018 NAHT this must change: “Ofsted inspectors should be the only people who should be inspecting schools…which means no more RSC-initiated visits that can feel like inspections with those extra demands for data, adding to bureaucracy.” Regional School commissioners do not stay in post for long, and often leave to become CEOs of multi-academy trusts.

== Operators ==
A number of private and charitable organisations run groups of academies. These major operators include ARK Schools, Academies Enterprise Trust, E-ACT (formerly Edutrust Academies Charitable Trust), Emmanuel Schools Foundation, Harris Federation, Oasis Trust, Ormiston Academies Trust, Tauheedul Education Trust and United Learning Trust.

The Department for Education publishes a full list of active academy sponsors.

In September 2017, the Wakefield City Academies Trust announced it was winding down and ceasing to trade as it hadn't the capacity to manage its 21 schools and asked the government to make an alternative arrangement.

=== Concerns ===
In 2015, the Sutton Trust expressed concerns that academies and particularly academy chains (MAT)s were not always delivering results that the government had hoped for. They sponsored and published research challenging aspects of policy; the programme is called "Chain Effects".

Other, independent research has examined the impact of MATs. Bernardinelli et al (2018) found no positive impact from MAT status overall, but that pupils in small and mid-sized MATs tend to perform better, on average, than their peers in comparable maintained schools in both phases and, in the primary phase, than comparable standalone academies. Conversely, secondary school pupils in larger MATs (with 16+ schools) tend to do worse compared to those in both standalone academies and maintained schools.

Other studies have focussed on the wider impact of MATs. This includes Greany and Higham's (2018) study of academisation and the Government's wider 'school-led self-improving system' reforms, which showed that MATs were contributing to fragmentation and reduced democratic oversight of schools.

In 2024, the Education Policy Institute found that English MATs had significantly higher annual turnover of secondary classroom teachers (19.5%) than local authorities schools (14.4%). Large MATs, with 10 or more schools, also had higher rates of pupil absence, suspension and unexplained departures than smaller MATs and local authority schools.

=== League tables ===
Following mounting ongoing concern a league table was produced to name and shame the worst performers using the Progress 8 benchmark, which measures GCSE results after compensating for each pupil's performance at the end of Key Stage 2.

A summary of the league table for 2017 is:

Best-performing academy trusts

Trust	Progress 8 score
The Thinking Schools Academy Trust	0.68
Inspiration Trust	0.55
Harris Federation	0.54
North East Learning Trust	0.53
Dixons Academy Trust	0.53
Tudor Grange Academies Trust	0.50
Outwood Grange Academies Trust	0.48
The Seckford Foundation Free Schools Trust	0.45
Kent Catholic Schools Partnership	0.36
The Diocese of Westminster Academy Trust	0.31
The Redhill Academy Trust	0.27

Worst-performing academy trusts

Trust	Progress 8 score
Hart Schools Trust	-1.21
The Midland Academies Trust	-0.69
Wakefield City Academies Trust	-0.54
UCAT	-0.51
Eastern Multi-Academy Trust	-0.5
Athena Learning Trust	-0.49
Aldridge Education	-0.44
Greenwood Academies Trust	-0.43
Fylde Coast Teaching School Ltd	-0.41
Learning Schools Trust	-0.4

=== Gender inequality ===
Trusts are exempt from all Teacher Pay and Conditions agreements. In March 2018, The Guardian revealed that they fail in gender equality. The study reveals several trusts where women face hourly pay deficit of more than 50%. The worst offender is Schoolsworks Academy Trust, West Sussex where the median hourly pay gap in favour of men is 62% – meaning that a woman is paid 38 pence for every £1 earned by a man. The Wakefield City Academies Trust, which managed 21 schools before its collapse, had a median hourly gender pay gap of 52%. The Kent Catholic Schools Partnership staff face a gender pay gap of almost 50%.

=== Disadvantaged children ===
In December 2018, the Sutton Trust published a report, Chain Effects 2018, building on work they had done in previous reports on the effectiveness of MATs in improving the performance of disadvantaged children. Poorer pupils in 12 out of 58 chains analysed by Professor Merryn Hutchings and Professor Becky Francis, performed above the national average on key measures of 2017 attainment for disadvantaged pupils. Three chains – City of London, Diocese of London, and Harris – were significantly above the average. However, in 38 of the 58 chains analysed, disadvantaged pupils performed below the state school national average.

The Sutton Trust recommends that:

- Ofsted should be permitted to perform formal inspections of academy chains, then make criteria-based judgements rather that the current summary evaluations.
- Regional Schools Commissioners must take action against chains that are underperforming and do not show improvement. RSCs should be allowed to include successful local authorities as alternative providers.
- The Government should work with the National and Regional Schools Commissioners to create mechanisms to share good practice. Chains that demonstrate they are able to better assist students in attaining results should be used as a model for other chains.
- Ofsted should commission additional research on what makes a chain successful and why.
