= Clinker brick =

Type of construction brick

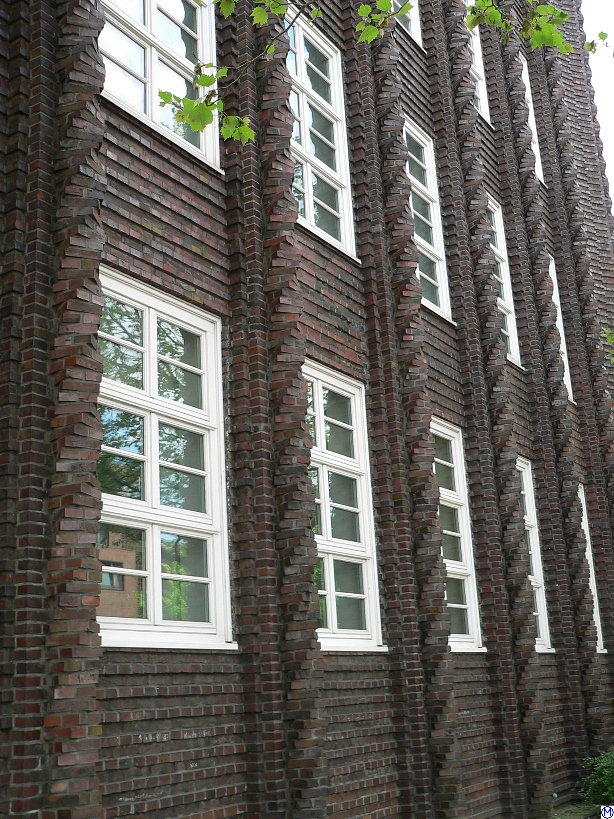
Reemtsma cigarette factory in Hamburg by Fritz Höger

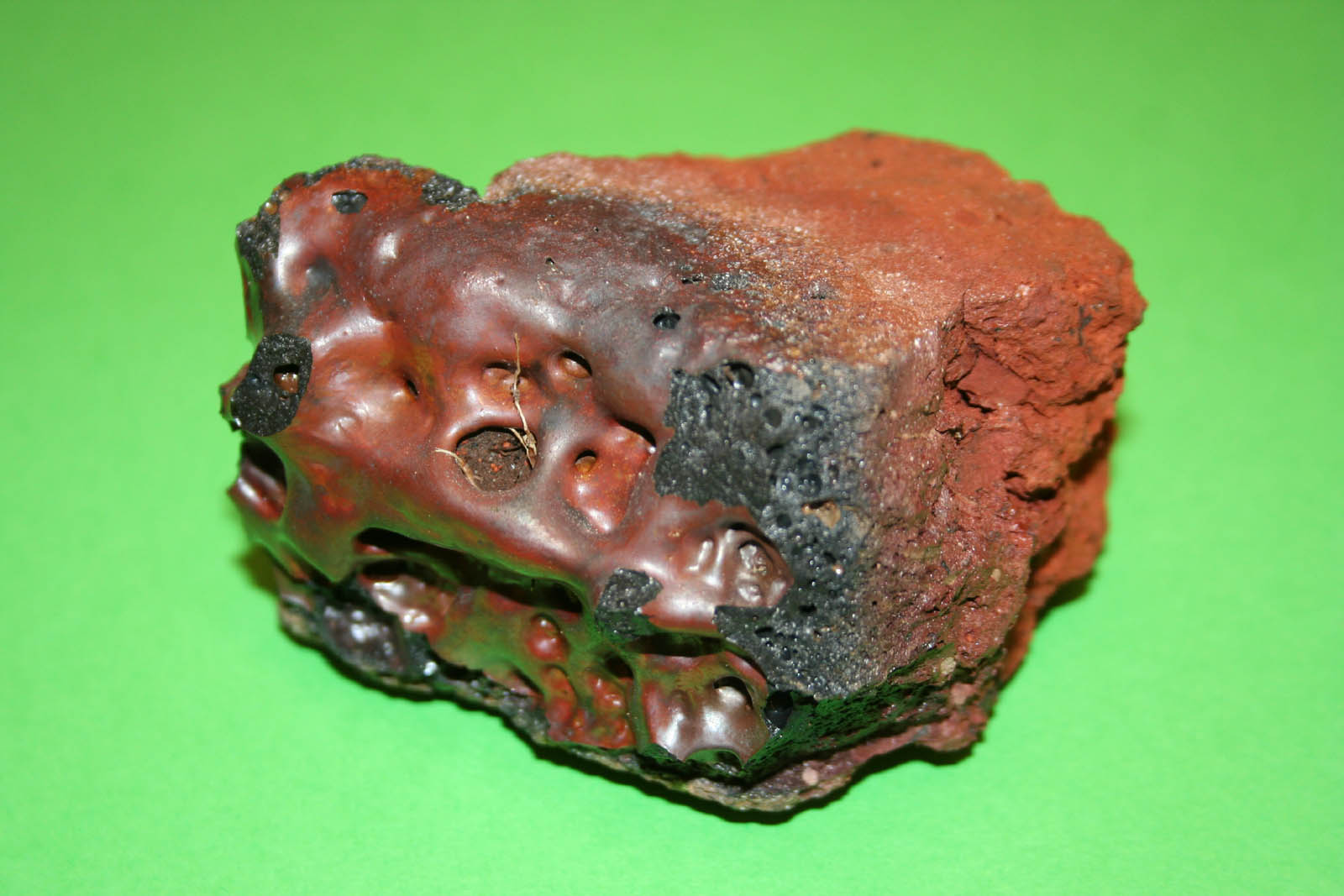
A piece of vitrified brick

Clinker bricks are partially-vitrified bricks used in the construction of buildings.

Clinker bricks are produced when wet clay bricks are exposed to excessive heat during the firing process, sintering the surface of the brick and forming a shiny, dark-colored coating. Clinker bricks have a blackened appearance, and they are often misshapen or split. Clinkers are so named for the metallic sound they make when struck together.

Clinker bricks are denser, heavier, and more irregular than standard bricks. Clinkers are water-resistant and durable, but have higher thermal conductivity than more porous red bricks, lending less insulation to climate-controlled structures.

The brick-firing kilns of the early 20th century—called brick clamps or "beehive" kilns—did not heat evenly, and the bricks that were too close to the fire emerged harder, darker, and with more vibrant colors, according to the minerals present in the clay. Initially, these clinkers were discarded as defective, but around 1900, the bricks were salvaged by architects who found them to be usable, distinctive, and charming. Clinker bricks were widely admired by adherents of the Arts and Crafts movement.

In the United States, clinker bricks were popularized by the Pasadena, California architecture firm Greene and Greene, who used them for walls, foundations, and chimneys. On the East Coast, clinkers were used extensively in the Colonial Revival style of architecture.

Modern brick-making techniques do not produce clinker bricks, and they have become rare. Builders can procure clinkers from salvage companies; alternatively, some brickmakers purposefully manufacture clinker bricks or produce imitations.

== Dutch origin ==
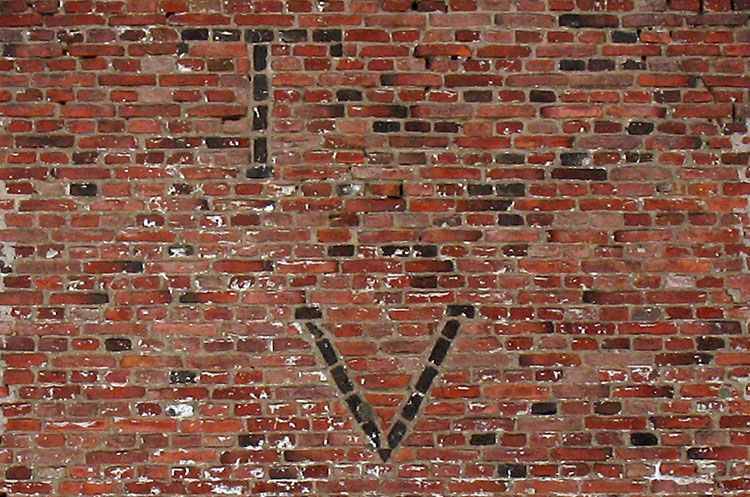
Clinker bricks used to form family initials on the Jan Van Hoesen House, a 1700s Dutch house in upstate New York.

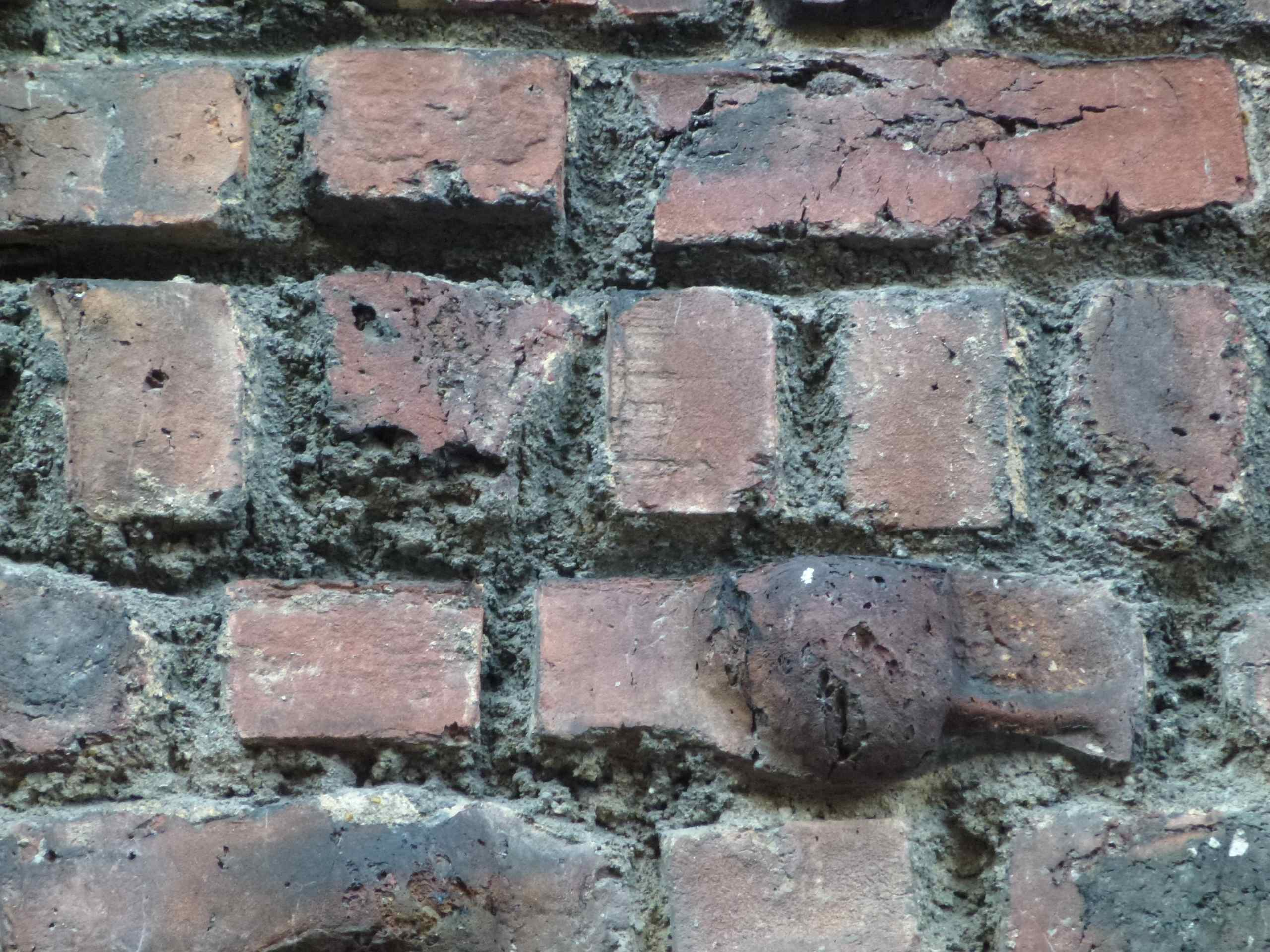
Clinker brick closeup of bricks in the so-called Clinker building on Barrow street in Greenwich Village, New York City.

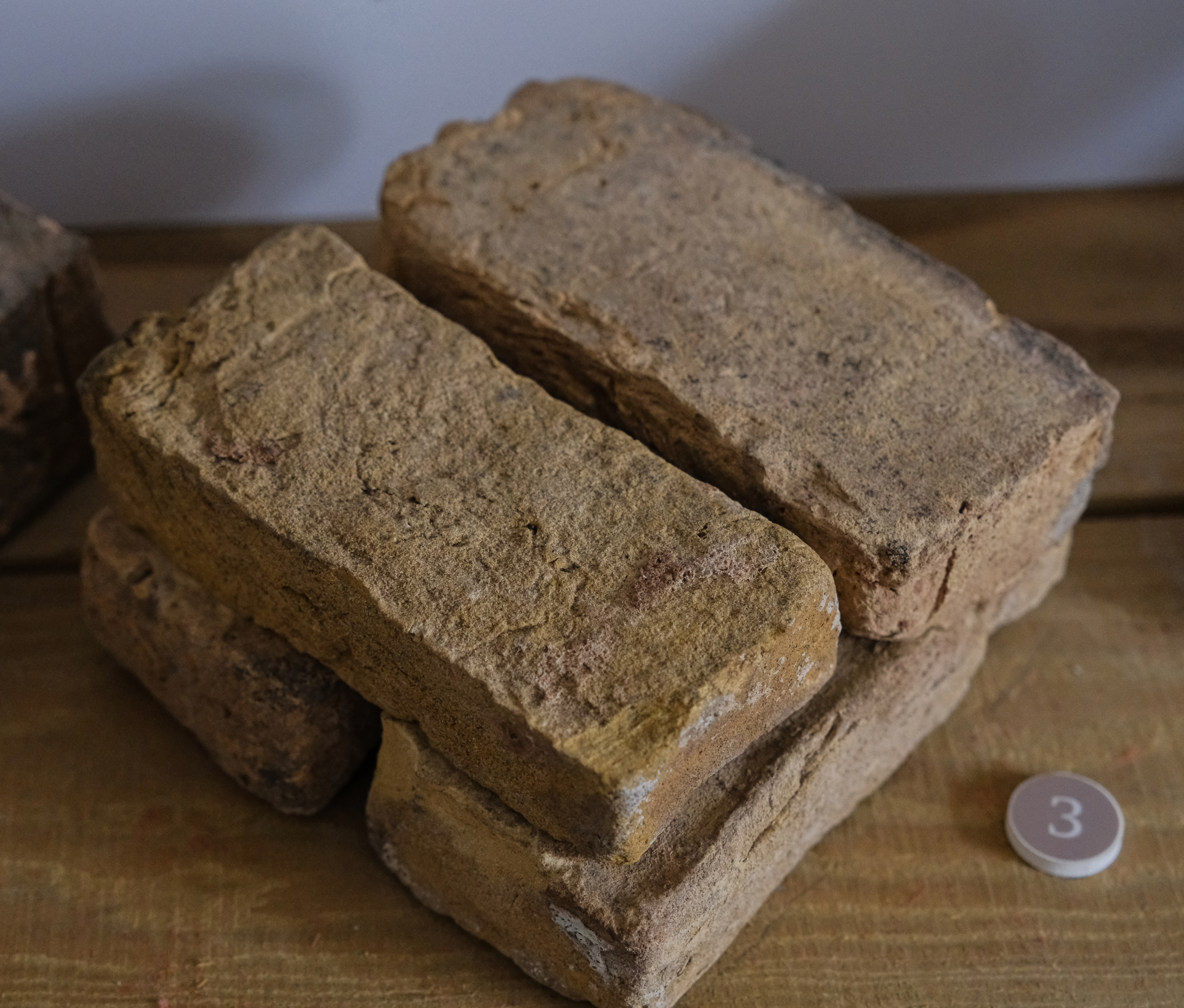
Dutch bricks (clinkers) found at Topsham Museum. Imported between 1660 and 1710, they were used for finer details such as fireplaces. They can be seen in many buildings in Topsham and are sometimes used in boundary walls.

Clinker is sometimes spelled klinker which is the contemporary Dutch word for the brick. Both terms are onomatopoeic, derived from the Middle Dutch klinkaerd, later klinker, from klinken (“to ring, resound”).

Clinker bricks are also known as Dutch paving bricks or Dutch clinker. In 18th century New York, the Dutch interspersed dark clinkers with regular bricks. Some used clinkers to spell out their family initials on brick dwellings such as the Jan Van Hoesen House.

== Technical information ==
Clinkers consist of bits and ends, field-late and white-burning or red-burning clays. Through different mixtures of the raw ingredients, many varied color nuances can be achieved. For the production of masonry units the source materials—clay and water—are mixed and formed industrially in a string extrusion process. For special purposes, for example the restoration of listed buildings, hand-formed clinkers are used. During the drying process, the water concentration decreases to approximately 3%. Then clinkers are fired at temperatures between 1,100 and 1,300 °C (2,010 and 2,370 °F) in a tunnel kiln (earlier in ring kilns), in contrast to the 800 to 1,200 °C (1,470 to 2,190 °F) temperature range seen with normal bricks.

== Clinkers in Germany ==
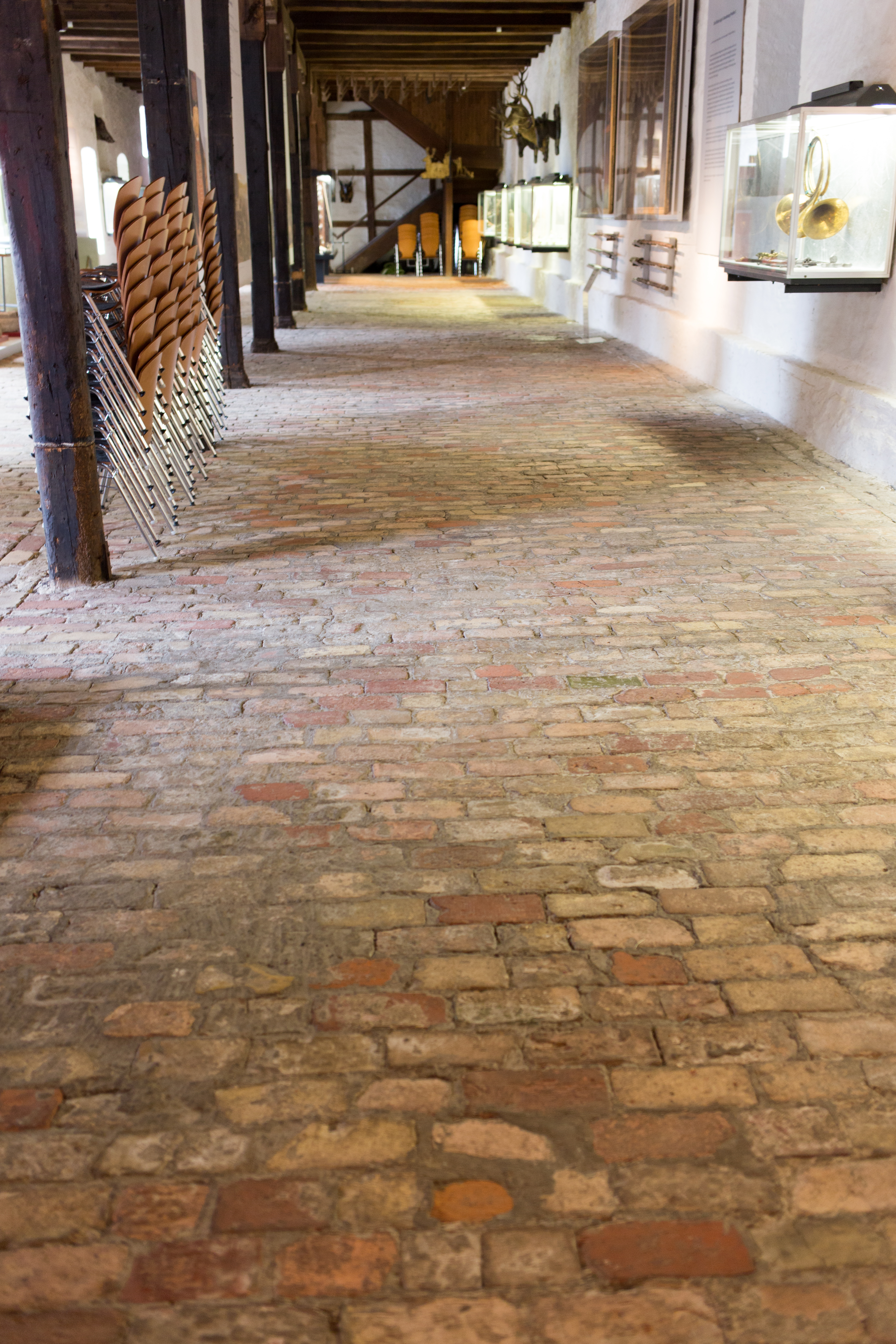
Historical floor at the Jagdmagazin, Jagdschloss Grunewald, Germany

In Germany, clinker bricks (German: Klinker) are named according to the German Institute for Standardization's DIN 105. They differ between full clinker (KMz) with a density of 2.0 to 2.2 kg/dm^{3} (120 to 140 lb/cu ft) and high hole clinker (KHLz) with a density of 1.6 to 1.8 kg/dm^{3} (100 to 112 lb/cu ft). Because of their low porosity, clinker bricks are inferior thermal insulators, compared to normal bricks. Canal clinkers are named according to the German Institute for Standardization’s DIN 4051. Clinkers are frost resisting and thus are suited particularly for façades.

The formats of the clinker stones are named according to the German Institute for Standardization’s DIN 1053. Base for the different formats is the normal format (NF) with length 240 millimetres (9.4 in), width 115 millimetres (4.5 in) and height 71 millimetres (2.8 in). For facade layouts architects also order clinkers produced in special dimensions.

For use in façades, it is possible to cope varied shaped elements (e.g., clinker expressionism, see picture). Earlier clinkers were often used in civil engineering works, for example in bridge building, the construction of sewers and hydraulic structures, for mortar floodgates and hoppers or as paving stones for road construction.

The German sculptor Ernst Barlach worked with clinkers, which were produced according to his specifications, for example by the brickyard of Ilse Bergbau AG.

=== Peat-fired clinker ===
Clinker bricks take on a special coloring, often greenish tones, if burnt with peat. The Chilehaus and the Ramada Hotel in Hamburg are famous buildings built with peat-fired clinker. The last ring stove for peat-fired clinker still operating is in Nenndorf near Aurich (East Frisia), producing bricks marketed under the name “Wittmunder Torfbrandklinker” (peat-fired clinker of Wittmund).

=== Greppin clinker ===
Greppiner Klinker (clinker of Greppin) is a hard-burnt yellow clinker brick. Greppin clinkers were mainly used for facing railway structures at the end of the 19th and in the early 20th centuries.

== Clinker brick tiles ==
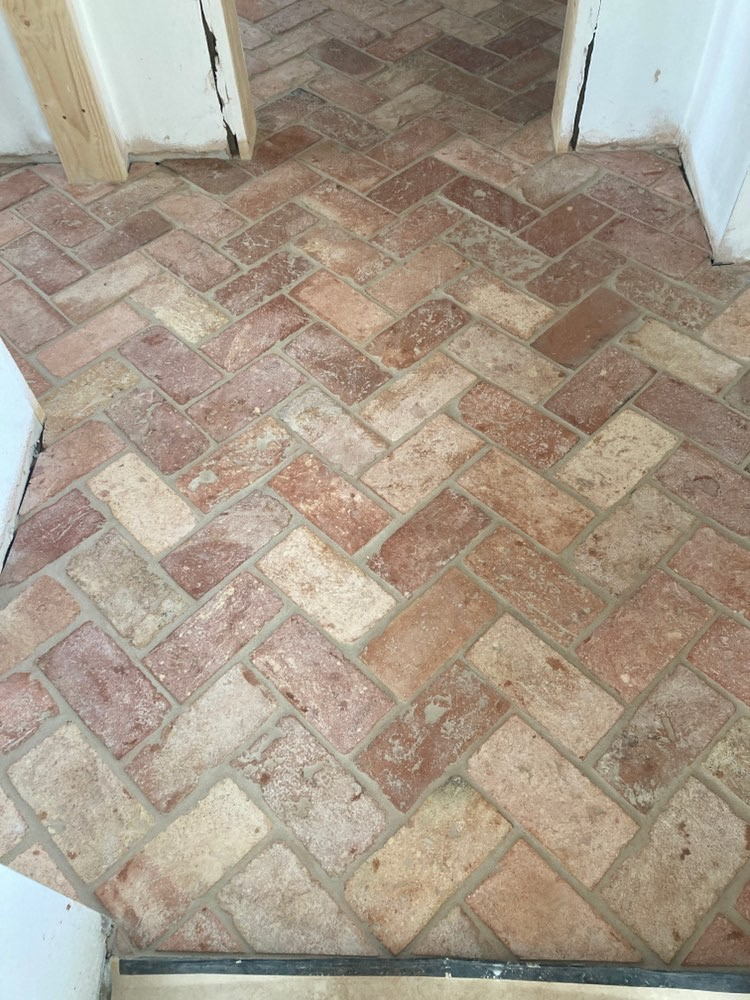
Lubelska brick floor tile shows variation in color due to heating

These reclaimed brick tiles are not sliced from full clinker bricks but from half clinkers. Full clinkers are very hard and, if used as flooring, would not only rip one's feet apart but also one's shoes. The surface of a Klinker brick is very hard, almost like glass, and any rough edges do not soften.

Half clinker bricks were fired at high temperatures in wood fired kilns over 100 years ago, but, because they have been sun dried prior to being loaded in the kiln, there has not been the same intensity of vitrification as with a full clinker brick. This makes them softer underfoot and therefore far more desirable for use in flooring. They also wear and soften with age.

Because the kilns have been wood-fired, there is a certain amount of inconsistency with the temperatures in different parts of the kiln, giving the brick tile its distinctive color variation.
