= Exe Estuary =

Estuary in Devon, England

Designations

Ramsar Wetland
- Official name: Exe Estuary
- Designated: 11 March 1992
- Reference no.: 542

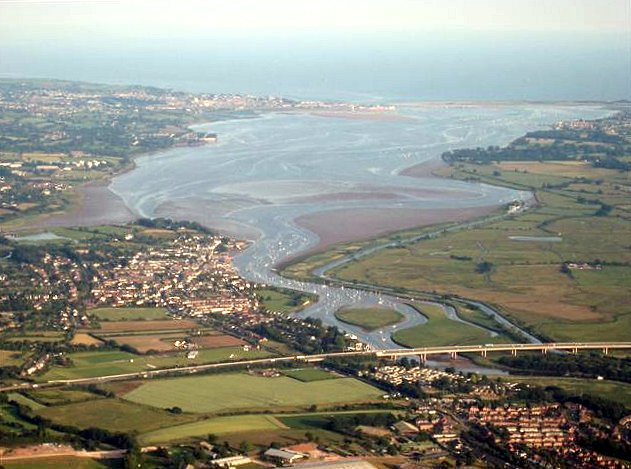
The Exe estuary seen from a hot air balloon. The road at the bottom is the M5, Topsham is at the left with Exmouth beyond. Dawlish Warren extends across from the right, below it is the Exeter Canal and Exminster Marshes.

The Exe estuary is an estuary on the south coast of Devon, England.

The estuary starts just to the south (grid reference SX9589) of the city of Exeter, and extends south for approximately eight miles to meet the English Channel (SX9980). The estuary is a ria and so is larger than would be the case given the size of the River Exe, the main river feeding into the estuary.

On the east shore (from north to south) is the town of Topsham, the villages of Exton and Lympstone and at the estuary mouth, the seaside resort of Exmouth. Opposite Exmouth on the west shore is the village of Dawlish Warren with its sand spit extending across the mouth of the estuary. Above this there are fewer settlements on the west shore, with just the villages of Starcross and Cockwood, both adjoining the lower portion of the estuary.

The River Clyst also feeds into the estuary, just below Topsham.

The River Kenn feeds into the estuary near Kenton.

The soil is alluvial, derived from Devonian, Carboniferous and Permian rocks.

== Conservation status ==
The estuary is a Special Protection Area and SSSI. Parts of the extent designated as Exe Estuary SSSI are owned by the Crown Estate and parts are owned by the RSPB. It is also a Ramsar site.

The Exe Estuary is a site of international importance for wading birds, which feed on the estuary mudflats at low tide, and roost at high tide at the adjacent Dawlish Warren SSSI and Bowling Green Marsh. The RSPB has two nature reserves adjoining the estuary, at Bowling Green Marsh and Exminster Marshes.

Over 10,000 wildfowl and 20,000 waders winter on the estuary. These include dark-bellied brent goose (Branta bernicla), Eurasian wigeon (Anas penelope), ringed plover (Charadius hiaticula), black-tailed godwit (Limosa limosa), and pied avocet (Recurvirostra avosetta).

The Exminster Marshes, a series of fields drained by dykes and ditches, carry several plants rare in Devon including parsley, water dropwort (Oenanthe lachenalii), flowering rush (Butomus umbellatus) and frogbit (Hydrocharis morsus-ranae). Dragonflies are also supported, such as the ruddy darter (Sympetrum sanguineum) and hairy dragonfly (Brachytron pratense).

The marshes are bounded by the Exeter Canal. Both are fringed by beds of common reed Phragmites australis, providing important habitat for Old World warblers.

Burrowing invertebrates are found in the sandbanks and mudflats. These include lugworm (Arenicola marina), peppery furrow shell (Scrobicularia plana), tellins Macoma spp., common cockle (Cerastoderma edule), pod razor (Ensis siliqua), sea potato (Echinocardium cordatum), and masked crab (Corystes cassivelaunus). Beds of blue mussels (Mytilus edulis) are food for Eurasian oystercatchers (Haematopus ostralegus). The estuary is the only British location for the polychaete worm Ophelia bicornia.

== Access and recreation ==
The Exe Valley Way Footpath runs south from Starcross, Northwards through the whole of the Exe estuary, and further north to the heights of Exmoor, ending at the source of the River Exe - Exe Head. The route covers almost 50 miles.

== See also ==
- Avocet Line
