= Arden Arms =

Listed pub in Stockport, Greater Manchester, England

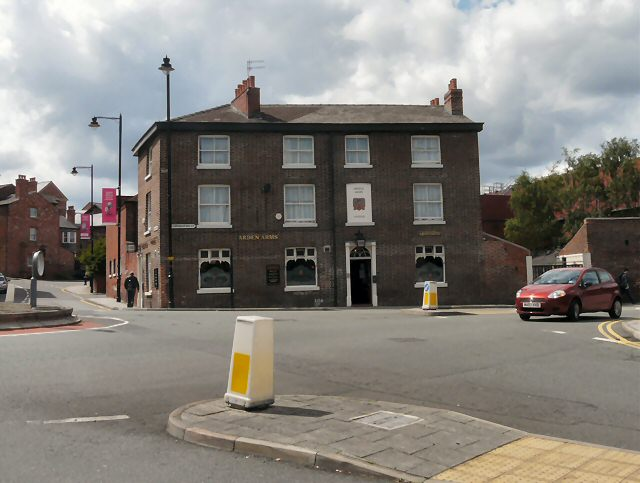
- The pub in 2009

- Location within Greater Manchester

General information
- Type: Public house
- Location: 23 Millgate, Stockport, Greater Manchester, England
- Coordinates: 53.4119°N 2.1549°W
- Year built: c. 1815; 211 years ago
- Renovated: Mid-19th and early 20th centuries (altered)
- Owner: Robinsons

Design and construction
- Designations

Listed Building – Grade II
- Official name: The Arden Arms
- Designated: 13 July 1988
- Reference no.: 1240421

Website
- Official website

The Arden Arms is a Grade II listed public house on the corner of Millgate and Corporation Street in Stockport, Greater Manchester, England. Built around 1815, it stands on a site with a long history of pub use, and was acquired by Robinsons Brewery in 1889, making it one of the company's earliest tied houses. The Campaign for Real Ale (CAMRA) regards its interior as being of "outstanding national historic importance", rating it three stars on its National Inventory of Historic Pub Interiors.

== History ==
The building was constructed around 1815, according to its official listing. The site has a long history of pub use, with an inn recorded here in 1709 under the name "Ye Blew Stoops", which was already described as old at that time.

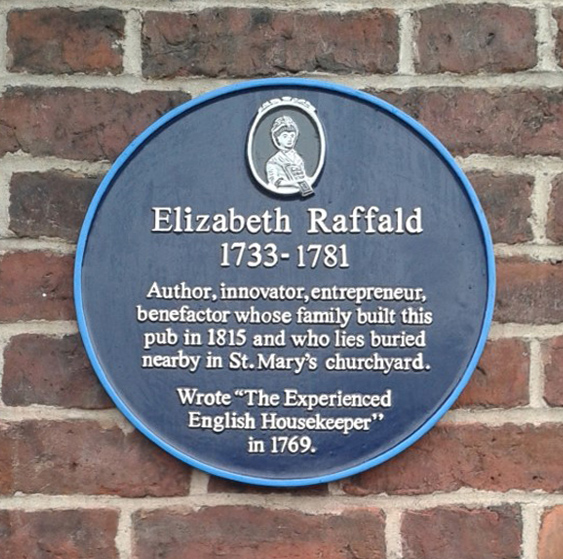
The memorial plaque to Elizabeth Raffald

In 1889 the Arden Arms was acquired by Robinsons Brewery, (Note: Other sources give an acquisition date of 1879 or 1890.) making it one of their earliest tied houses. The 1898 and 1936 Ordnance Survey maps mark the building as a public house without attributing a name.

On 13 July 1988, the Arden Arms was designated a Grade II listed building. It is regarded by the Campaign for Real Ale (CAMRA) as having an interior of "outstanding national historic importance" and is rated three stars on its National Inventory of Historic Pub Interiors.

In February 2017, a blue plaque was installed on the building to commemorate the English author, innovator and entrepreneur Elizabeth Raffald, whose nephew George Raffald was the pub's first landlord. She produced the first directory of Manchester and Salford in 1772, among other works, and is buried at the nearby St Mary's Church.

== Architecture ==
=== Exterior ===
The building is constructed in red brick in Flemish bond with a slate roof and has three storeys over cellars. It stands on a corner plot, with four bays facing Corporation Street and one bay returning along Millgate. The third bay contains a six‑panel door with a fanlight, while the other bays have early 20th‑century windows with etched glass set in the original openings.

On the first floor are mid to late 19th‑century sash windows, with the window above the doorway narrower and blocked. The second floor has shorter sashes across all bays. A timber cornice runs below the eaves. The roof is hipped at the left end with an altered chimney, and there are end stacks on the right‑hand gable.

At the rear is a tall stair window with a multi‑paned sash. The Millgate side has a doorway and window arranged in the same way as the front.

=== Interior ===
Inside, the ground and first floors contain several early-19th‑century six‑panel doors with decorative surrounds. The bar counter dates from the early to mid‑1800s and has a curved end, panelled lower sections and pilasters set between multi‑paned windows, with a moulded top above. An early 19th‑century staircase rises to the second floor, with turned newels, simple balusters and a swept handrail.

The ground‑floor rooms are numbered. The front‑right room (No. 6) has a floor of blue and red tiles and fixed seating from the early to mid‑1800s. The kitchen at the rear contains cupboards with fielded panels and H‑hinges. The front‑left room (No. 2) has later bench seating.

A fourth room, known as the Select, has an unusual layout as it can only be reached by going through the bar with staff permission. Only two other pubs are known to have a comparable arrangement: the Bridge Inn in Topsham, Devon, and the Star Inn in Netherton, Northumberland.

== See also ==
- Listed buildings in Stockport
- Listed pubs in Greater Manchester
