= Jan Van Hoesen House =

Historic house in New York, United States

- U.S. National Register of Historic Places
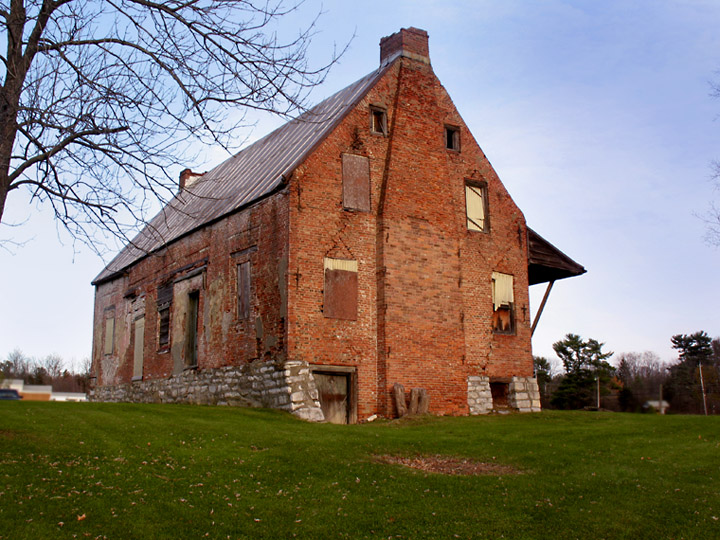
- Van Hoesen House, November 2007

- Location within New York Location within the United States
- Location: NY 66, Claverack, New York
- Coordinates: 42°15′23.11″N 73°45′7.95″W
- Area: 12 acres (4.9 ha)
- Built: 1720
- NRHP reference No.: 79001570
- Added to NRHP: August 1, 1979

Jan Van Hoesen House is an early-18th-century house in New York State. Northeast on NY 66 of Hudson towards Chatham, just east of Claverack Creek, stands a vacant medieval-looking brick structure over the Dutch Acres Mobile Home Park. Like the Columbia County Historical Society's Luykas Van Alen House in Kinderhook, the steeply pitched roof, parapet-gabled house is a rare surviving example of a type of rural house characteristic of the upper Hudson Valley in the first half of the 18th century. Van Hoesen House is located on Route 66, north of the City of Hudson.

== History and architectural influences ==
The house, built between 1715 and 1724, is one of approximately seven similar brick dwellings to survive into the 21st century. Built usually in an elongated rectangular form of brick over a timber frame, these residences varied in the arrangement of windows, doors, and rooms according to the tastes of their owner. The style originated in the 16th-century Netherlands and was descendant of medieval longhouses.

The form was introduced into New Netherland before the mid-17th century, but did not become prevalent in the region of Columbia County until about 1715, a period of economic prosperity. According to cultural historian Ruth Piwonka, such brick houses are not merely farmhouses but substantial upper-middle-class residences expressing tastes and prosperity in a northern European manner.

== Architectural features and layout ==
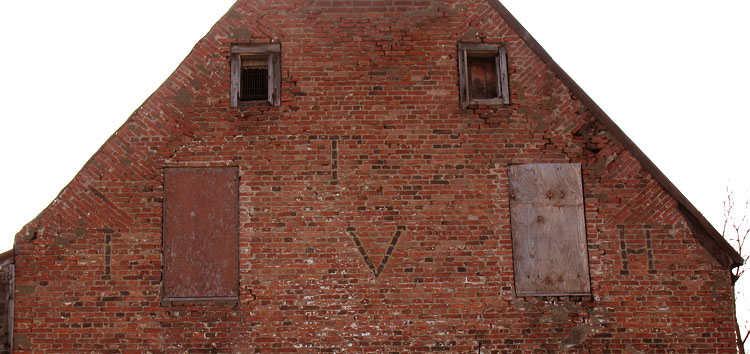
Northeast gable with four family monogram initials inlaid in brick. Click to enlarge.

Originally the approach to the Dutch Acres' house was from the southwest and northeast on a road that led to Claverack Landing (present-day Hudson). In a reversal of the well-known Dutch urban house, which places the main entrance in the gable end, the house has its entrances in the side walls and its chimneys in the gables. The present back of the house was originally the front. Five openings of equal width, height, and spacing are indicated on this facade. These openings are marked by gauged flat arches in the masonry made decorative through the use of red vertical stretchers alternating with blackened Winker headers. These arches are a rare survivor of such decorative technique. All the openings are altered from their original form, either made smaller or changed in function.

The house's southwesterly gable wall contains a thin engaged chimney flue that enabled the occupants to benefit from fireplaces in the cellar and on the main floor. This is also a rare example of such construction although it is known to have once been common throughout the region. The doorway at the corner leading to a cellar kitchen is original to the house as are the garret and granary window openings and frames. Wrought-iron fleur-de-lis beam anchors on both gables and iron gutter hangers are also distinctive surviving features.

The tin roof is a later replacement for the shingled or possibly tiled original roof. The easterly gable of the house contains five windows and a door. The first floor windows and door are later additions. The second floor windows are alterations of original windows and one even shows evidence of an early window frame. The granary windows are also original openings.

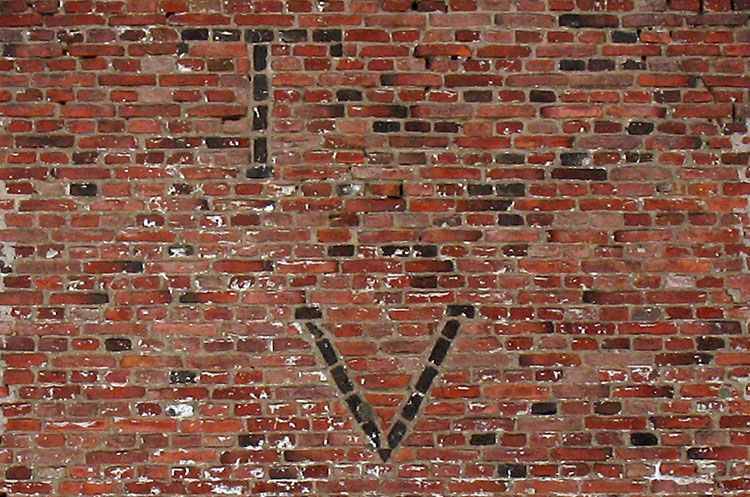
Two of the Four Family Monogram Initials Inlaid in Brick. Click to Enlarge.

The truly principal feature of this gable, however, are die initials "T" and "I V H" worked in the masonry in black clinker brick headers. These are the monograms of the first occupants of the house, Jan van Hoesen (1687–1745) and his wife Tanneke. The "T" stands for Tanneke, given name of the wife of Jan Van Hoesen, Tanneke Wittbeck. The letters "V" and "H" stand for Jan's family name Van Hoesen. Jan's given name is represented by the letter "I", which is the Dutch representation of the letter "J".

== Evolution of the structure ==
Modifications from the late 18th century and periods in the 19th century are represented in this structure. More details on this subject are sought.

== Family history ==
Jan van Hoesen (1687-1745), who married in 1711 Tanneke Witbeck, a daughter of Hendrick Witbeck of Claverack, was a grandson of Jan Franse van Hoesen (1609-1667), a Frisian sailor from Husum, then belonging to the Duchy of Schleswig in Denmark. It was the elder Van Hoesen who in 1662 purchased from the Mohicans the tract of land that included the present city of Hudson and town of Greenport. Jan, nonetheless, served as a deacon in the Lutheran church at Lunenberg (present-day Athens) across the Hudson River and, along with his wife, was extremely active in Lutheran church affairs. Jan and Tanneke had eleven children, of whom three sons appear at the locality of this house at the time of the Revolution. And the house remained in the family for several generations.

== Significance and current activity ==
As the most intact remaining example of a type of Dutch architecture unique to the Hudson Valley, the Jan van Hoesen house is significant. It reflects the tastes and life style of the prosperous Hudson Valley Dutch freeholder, who is often overlooked by a historical emphasis on the lifestyle of the manor lords. The house was nominated to the New York State Inventory of Historic Resources in January 1976. Around 2008 the Van Hoesen House Historical Foundation was established for the purpose of promoting public awareness of the structure and eventually protecting and preserving it. In February, 2009, the home was included on the "Seven To Save" list of endangered historic properties by the Preservation League of New York State.

In June, 2011, New York State Museum researchers began the first phase of an archaeological excavation project at the Van Hoesen house site in Claverack, New York. They will be searching for buried artifacts that could reveal details about colonial life in the Hudson Valley.
