= Richard Sainthill =

English numismatist and author (1787–1870)

Richard Sainthill (28 January 1787 – 31 December 1870) was an English born Irish numismatist and author.

== Life and work ==
Sainthill was born on 28 January 1787 in Topsham, Devon. His father, Richard was a captain in the Royal Navy.

He resided in County Cork, Ireland, and was noted for unearthing Cork's city charter of 1185 in the British Museum in the 1820s.

He died 31 December 1870 at his home in Valebrook, Cork.

== Bibliography ==
- 1853: An Olla Podrida Or, Scraps, Numismatic, Antiquarian, and Literary.
- 1856: The Old Countess of Desmond
- 1857: Numismatic, and Other Crumbs

== Personal life ==
Sainthill married Charlotte, the daughter of Thomas Green of Mossbury, Hertforfshire.
