= Bridge Inn, Topsham =

Listed pub in Devon, England

Bridge Inn
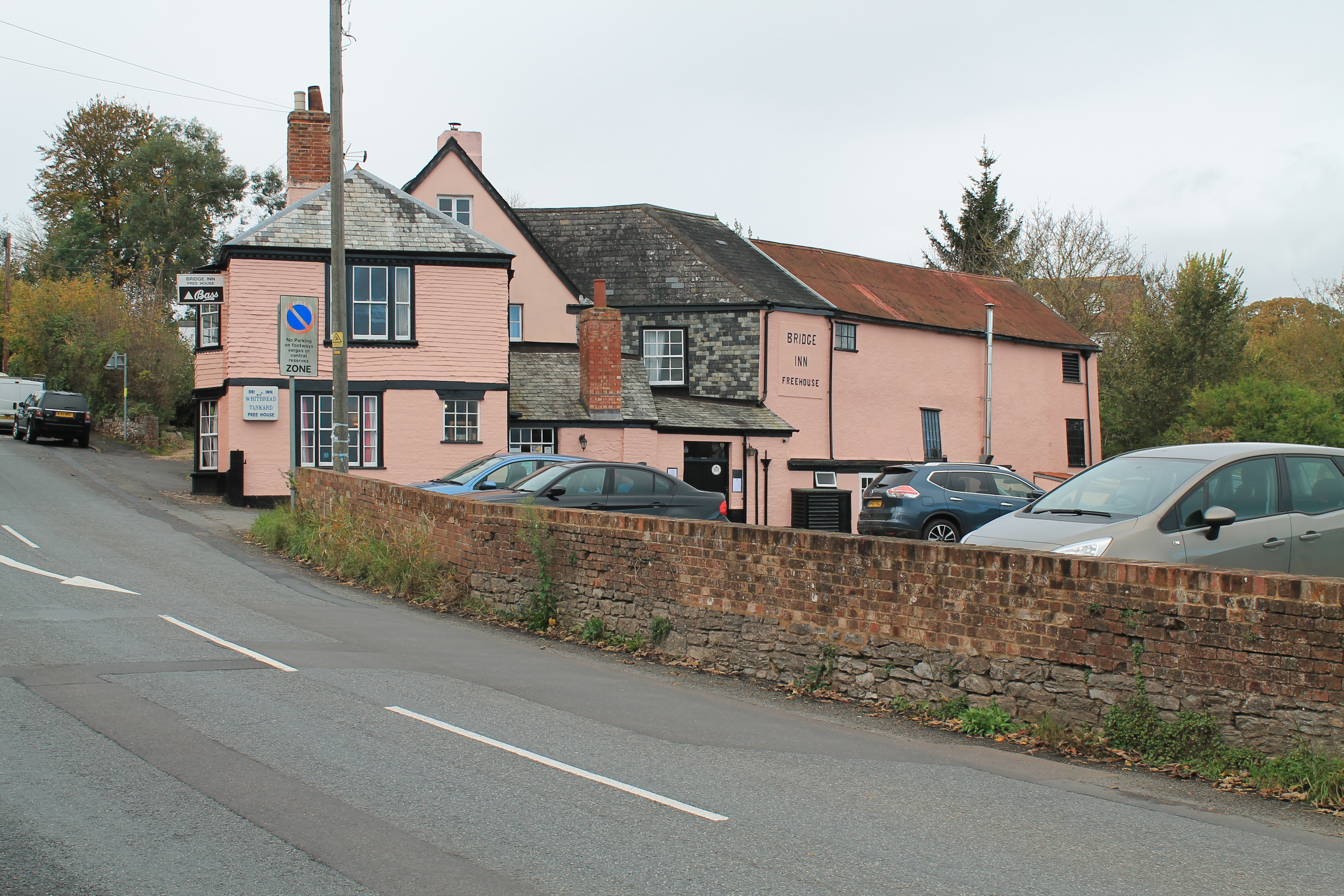
- The pub in 2019
- Alternative names: Pink Pub

General information
- Type: Public house; originally a coaching inn
- Location: Bridge Hill, Topsham, Devon, England
- Coordinates: 50°41′05″N 3°27′35″W
- Year built: 18th century

Design and construction
- Designations

Listed Building – Grade II
- Official name: Bridge Inn
- Designated: 11 November 1952
- Reference no.: 1306502

Website
- thebridgeinntopsham.co.uk

The Bridge Inn (also known locally as the Pink Pub) is a Grade II listed public house on Bridge Hill in Topsham, Devon, England. Occupying a site recorded in Domesday Book, the present building dates largely from the 18th century and retains a historic interior recognised by the Campaign for Real Ale (CAMRA) as being of "outstanding national historic importance". In 1998, it was visited by Queen Elizabeth II during what was reported as her first official visit to a pub.

== History ==
There have been people living at the site of Bridge Inn since at least 1086, as the dwelling was mentioned in Domesday Book. Parts of the present building date from the late 16th century, although the majority was built in the 18th century. The Bridge Inn has been a public house since at least 1797, when it included two dwellings, a quay and a salt refinery. The inn attracted wrestling competitions during the 19th century, and by 1900 there were cattle sales at the site.

On 11 November 1952, the Bridge Inn was designated a Grade II listed building. In June 2022 it was one of eleven pubs in England recognised for the significance of their interiors, having new information added to their list descriptions.

It was included on the Campaign for Real Ale (CAMRA)'s National Inventory of Historic Pub Interiors before the inventory's grading system was revised. Under the revised scheme, it is rated three stars and its interior is regarded as being "of outstanding national historic importance".

In 1998, Queen Elizabeth II visited the Bridge Inn for its 101st anniversary. There she was presented with a crate of commemorative ale, which she remarked that her husband, Prince Philip, Duke of Edinburgh, would enjoy. In 2008, for the pub's 111th anniversary, the same commemorative ale was brewed for a third time at Branscombe Vale Brewery, with a crate graciously received by Buckingham Palace. Coincidentally, at the same time, an invitation was sent to the pub for attendance at an event at the palace. The Queen remarked that she "couldn't believe 10 years had passed since her visit".

Inside, lager is only served in bottles, regular drinkers leave post-it notes on their favourite barrels of beer to be called when opened, and the pub will serve drinks by the third of a pint to allow for a wider variety of tasting. As of 2014, the inn has remained in the hands of the same family for more than a century, and is now available as a wedding venue.

== Architecture ==
=== Exterior ===
The building developed in several phases and is constructed from a combination of cob, stone and brick, with some areas finished in slate hanging. Most of the exterior is painted pink. The roofs are mainly slate, although some sections are covered with pantiles. Historic features include brick chimney stacks, cast-iron rainwater goods, and interior fittings such as plank doors, panelling, shutters and built-in bench seating dating from the 18th and 19th centuries.

The pub occupies part of a two-storey range, with a former dwelling at one end and the public rooms at the other. These include a snug, parlour and tap room, together with cellar accommodation. To the rear stands a former brewery and malthouse range, incorporating a kiln and a large public room.

The principal frontage faces Bridge Street and contains a mixture of sash and casement windows arranged around the entrances. A projecting two-storey section housing the tap room stands at the corner and is distinguished by a full-height bay window. Elsewhere, the building retains slate-hung walls, several chimney stacks, and a traditional hanging sign. To the rear, the former brewery buildings survive with features associated with their historic use, including loading openings and a hop-drying loft. The various ranges differ in height and reflect the building's gradual development over time.

=== Interior ===
The interior retains a number of historic features and is arranged around a panelled corridor linking the snug, parlour and tap room. The snug contains built-in seating, a salt cupboard and a large fireplace. The parlour retains fitted seating, shutters, a cast-iron fireplace and a serving hatch through which drinks are brought up from the cellar below. Known as the "Inner Sanctum", this room functions as a separate seating area to which customers may be invited. Only two other pubs are known to have a comparable arrangement, where customers can sit in a room behind an active serving area: the Arden Arms in Stockport and the Star Inn in Netherton, Northumberland. The tap room also preserves fixed seating and fitted cupboards, and retains advertising lettering in the fanlight above one of the doors.

Steps from the parlour lead down to the former beer cellar and kiln, which formed part of the building's brewing and malting operations. The kiln retains its furnace and much of its original structure, while the cellar has cobbled floors and timber-framed partitions.

Beyond the kiln is the former brewery building, now used as a large public room. Although adapted for later use, it retains evidence of its original function, including a surviving hop chute, shuttered openings, thick plastered walls and exposed timber roof structure. A gallery above the servery and the remains of the hop-drying floor illustrate the building's former brewing and malting role.
