= Clyst St George =

Village in Devon, England

Coordinates: 50.69103°N 3.43973°W

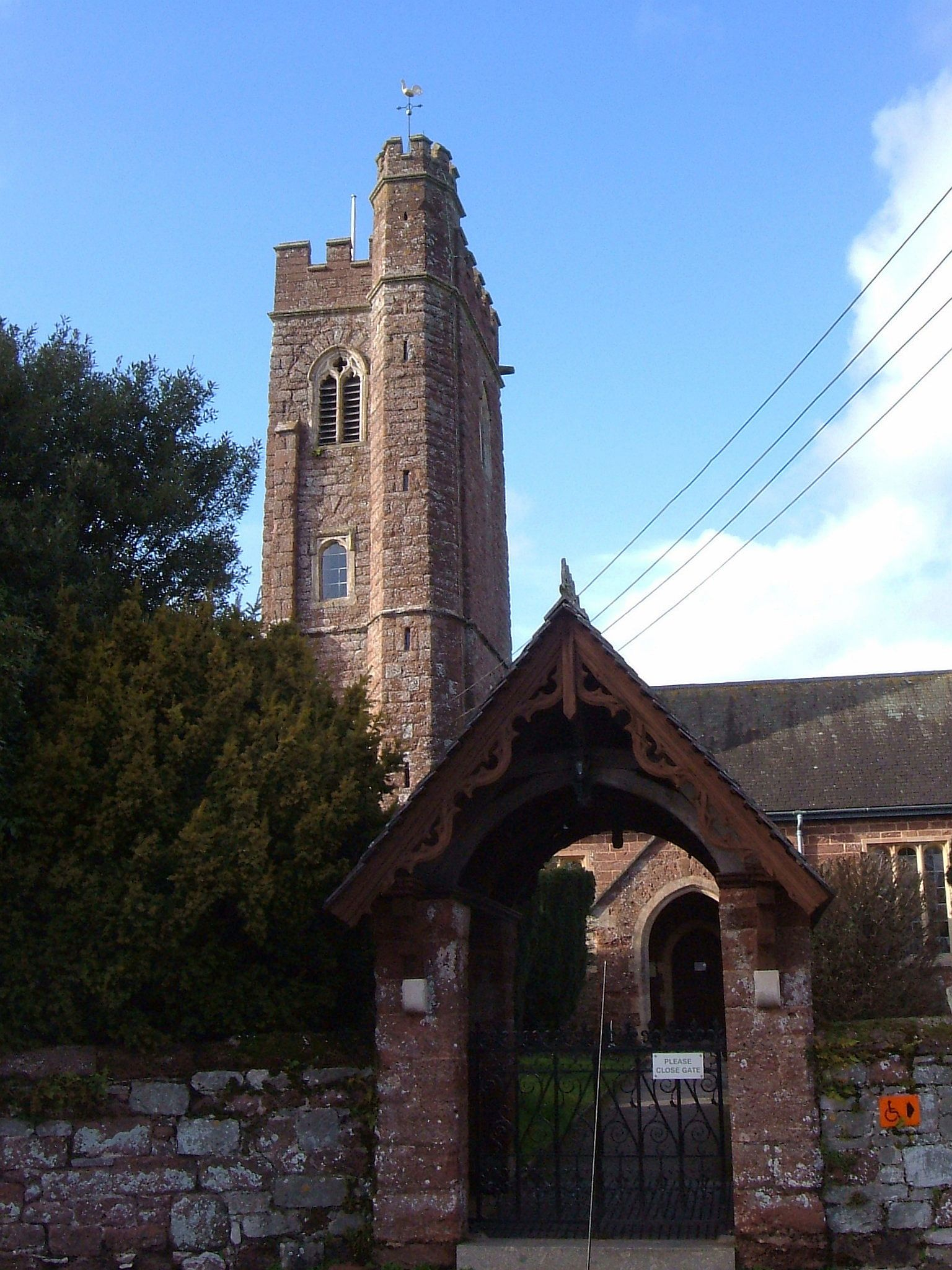
- Parish Church, Clyst St George

- Location within Devon
- OS grid reference: SX98398882
- District: East Devon
- Shire county: Devon
- Region: South West
- Country: England
- Sovereign state: United Kingdom
- Post town: EXETER
- Postcode district: EX3
- Dialling code: 01392
- Police: Devon and Cornwall
- Fire: Devon and Somerset
- Ambulance: South Western
- UK Parliament: Exmouth and Exeter East

Clyst St George (anciently Clyst Champernowne) is a village and civil parish in East Devon, England, adjoining the River Clyst some 4 miles (6.4 km) southeast of Exeter and 5 miles (8.0 km) north of Exmouth.

== Overview and history ==
The village is the most southerly of six parishes named after the River Clyst. It fell within the Hundred of East Budleigh, and the ecclesiastical Deanery of Aylesbeare.

The parish church, with a red sandstone tower, is dedicated to Saint George. It was extensively rebuilt in 1854–55, gutted by fire in an air raid in 1940, and again rebuilt in 1952. The Lady Seaward Primary School was endowed by Lady Hannah Seaward in 1705 and rebuilt in 1859. It was described by Pevsner as "unspoilt" and "picturesque". The Old Rectory dates from the 18th century.

Devon and Somerset Fire and Rescue Service have their headquarters at The Knowle, in Clyst St George, which is also the site of an operational fire station.

The A376 road passes through the village. A small commercial/industrial area, called Marsh Barton (but not to be confused with the industrial estate of the same name at Alphington in Exeter), is located beside the River Clyst and the road to Topsham, a neighbouring town on the other side of the Clyst to the west. The village has a pub with accommodation, located by the A376, called the "St. George and Dragon".

The village has a village hall, primary school, farm shop, and a cricket club. The settlement of Ebford is part of the civil parish, located just south of the main village, on the A376.
