= Dawlish Warren National Nature Reserve =

Nature reserve in Devon, England

Coordinates: 50°36′18″N 3°26′00″W

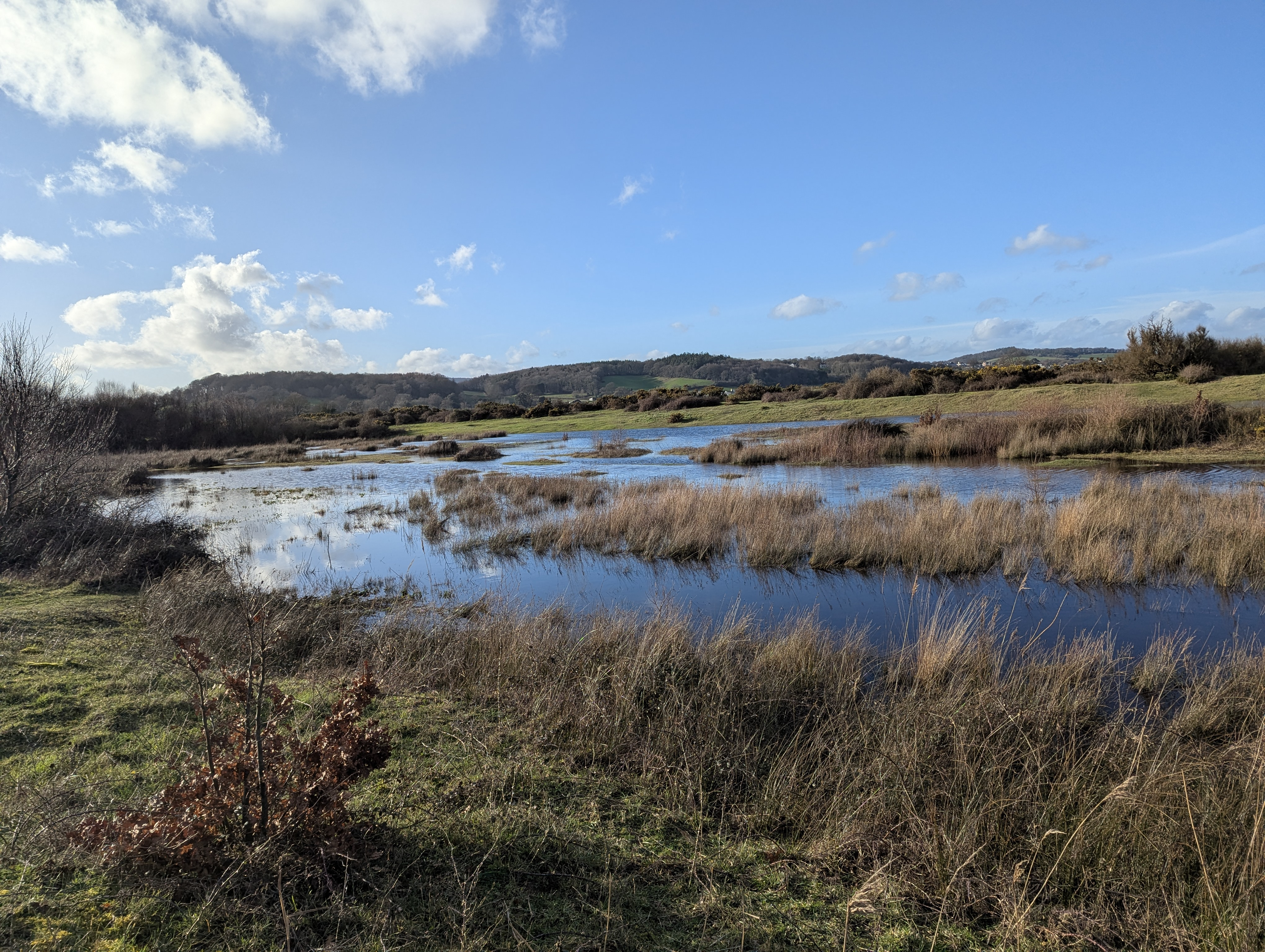
A freshwater pond at Dawlish Warren National Nature Reserve.

The Dawlish Warren National Nature Reserve is a national nature reserve near the village of Dawlish Warren in south Devon, England. It is part of the Exe Estuary Special Protection Area, and sits on a sand spit which runs across the mouth of the estuary. It is also a Site of Special Scientific Interest and part of it is a local nature reserve.

The Dawlish Warren nature reserve provides a major roosting site for wading birds and migratory waterfowl, and serves as a habitat for the endangered petalwort (Petalophyllum ralfsii), a liverwort. It is also one of only two sites in Britain where the sand crocus (Romulea columnae) grows. A large number of rare vagrant birds have been recorded at Dawlish Warren, including elegant tern (Thalasseus elegans), lesser crested tern (Thalasseus bengalensis), long-billed murrelet (Brachyramphus perdix), greater sand plover (Charadrius leschenaultii), semipalmated plover (Charadrius semipalmatus), Cream-coloured courser (Cursorius cursor) and great spotted cuckoo (Clamator glandarius). Some sand lizards (Lacerta agilis) have also been spotted at the reserve, as a result of re-introductions.

A rare dune grassland habitat can also be found in the nature reserve, and as a result is a candidate Special Area of Conservation. The Nature Reserve also contains one of the main tourist beaches in Teignbridge. Despite the emplacement of considerable quantities of protective rock armour at its lower end, the warren has been subject to erosion by the sea for over a hundred years.

The Teignbridge District Council owns and manages the seaward parts of the nature reserve, which is open to the public, while the Devon Wildlife Trust maintains the Inner Warren and the saltmarsh, which are not open to the public. The Inner Warren is leased to the Warren Golf Club.
