= Topsham Museum =

Museum in Devon, England

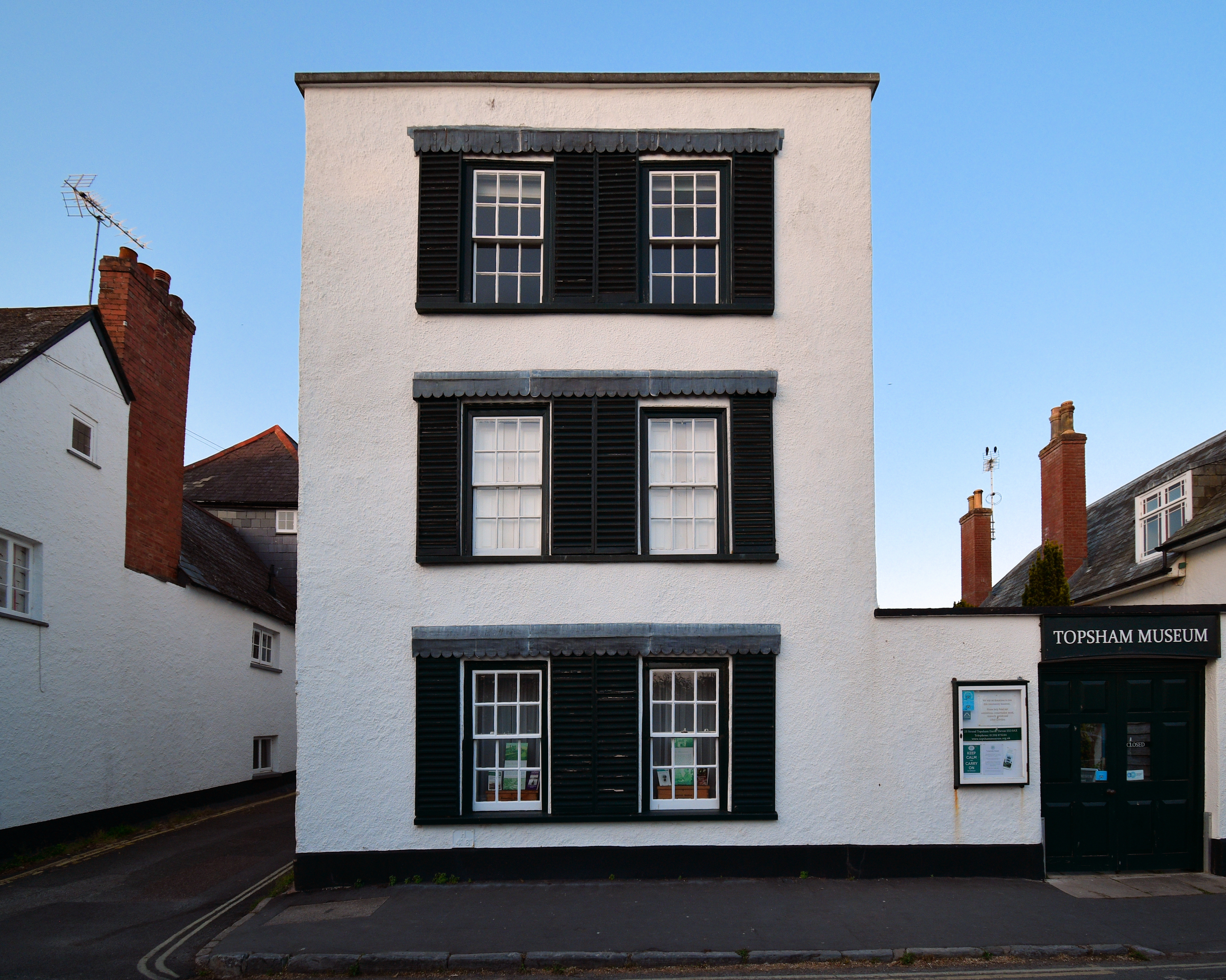
- Topsham Museum

- Shown within Devon
- Location: Topsham, Devon, England
- Coordinates: 50.67940927566952°N 3.462433902403577°W
- Accreditation: Arts Council England
- Founder: Dorothy Holman
- President: Rachel Nichols B.E.M.
- Chairperson: Jenny Ellis C.B.
- Owner: Exeter City Council
- Public transit access: Topsham railway station
- Website: topshammuseum.org.uk

Topsham Museum is a museum in the town of Topsham, Devon, England.

== History ==
Topsham Museum was founded in 1967 by Dorothy Holman.

Two of the museum's longstanding volunteers were honoured in the 2021 New Year Honours.

In 2024, the Earl of Devon was appointed patron of the museum.

In 2025, it was announced the museum would be closed for several months during extensive building repair works. During this time, collections can be viewed online.

== Organisation ==
Formerly governed as the Topsham Museum Society, in 2019 the museum was reconstituted as a charitable incorporated organisation overseen by a board of trustees and supported by a subscription membership model.

The museum maintains a formal link with the Royal Albert Memorial Museum in nearby Exeter, whose assistant curator acts as an advisor to the Topsham Museum's board of trustees.

The museum organises a regular cycle of lectures held at nearby Matthews Hall in Topsham.

The museum holds exhibits on a range of topics, including Exeter's Roman history, Topsham's maritime history (including the local construction of small boats as well as ships such as HMS Terror), and the actress Vivien Leigh.

Topsham Museum is run by a group of around 200 volunteers.

Admission to the museum is free.

== Building ==
The museum is housed in a 17th-century building on the Strand, Topsham, which is Grade II Listed. The building was constructed circa 1688 and given a new staircase and heightened upper floors in the 18th century. The museum's walls and gates are also separately Grade II Listed. The building is owned by Exeter City Council, to whom the museum's founder, Dorothy Holman, gave the building for use as a museum.

As of February 2025, the building is currently closed for repairs.
