= River Clyst =

River in Devon, England

Coordinates: 50.678°N 3.452°W

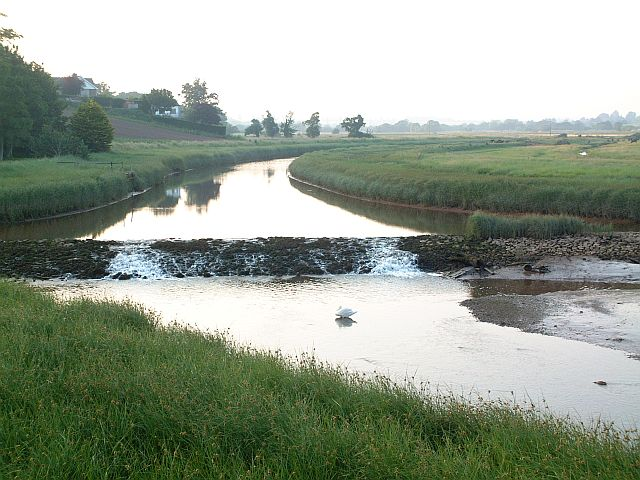
River Clyst near Topsham

The River Clyst is a river of Devon, England. The name derives from Old English, and translates as Clean-stream (the Welsh name of Clydach, has similar origins). The river lends its name to several settlements on its route, Clyst Honiton, Clyst St Lawrence, Clyst St George, and Broadclyst. The William part of Clyst William derives from the Old English of aewelm, which means river source.

Rising near the village of Clyst William near Cullompton, the river runs for 24 miles (38 km), west and southwest, flowing through the settlements of Norman's Green, Plymtree, Clyst Hydon, Clyst St. Lawrence, Westwood, emerging in the Clyst Valley.

From there, the river goes southward through Broadclyst, West Clyst, Clyst Honiton, Clyst St. Mary and Clyst St. George, eventually flowing into the Exe estuary at Bowling Green Marsh, immediately south of the port of Topsham near Exeter. The river discharges 1.3 cubic metres (46 cu ft) per second on average, and is tidal from the Exe estuary as far as Newcourt Barton.

In 2011 work started on a new cycle and pedestrian bridge crossing the River Clyst at Fishers Mill, Topsham, forming part of the Sustrans’ National Cycle Network [NCN]. The bridge feeds into the Exe Estuary Trail, part of NCN2, and was opened in November 2013. A 738-foot (225 m) elevated timber boardwalk was planned across the salt marshes and flood plain with a main bridge spanning 390 feet (120 m) across the river. The new bridge is downstream from an existing narrow grade II listed masonry highway bridge.

In winter, the flood plain attracts large flocks of Brant geese and Canada geese. On the north side of the Clyst, just west of the Exmouth railway line, is Bowling Green Marsh, a small RSPB reserve with a hide (SX971877). In 1988, a spill of diesel oil into the estuary threatened the habitat and the birds in the area around the river mouth. Special booms and pumps were brought in to remove the 5,000 imperial gallons (23,000 L; 6,000 US gal) spill. A 1994 survey of fish species in the river determined that it contained bullhead, dace, eel, minnow, stone loach, stickleback, mullet and flounder. The only salmonids were some trout in one of the tributaries. By 2008, concerns were being raised about the quality of the water citing a high level of pollution.
