= RSPB Bowling Green Marsh =

Nature reserve in Devon, England

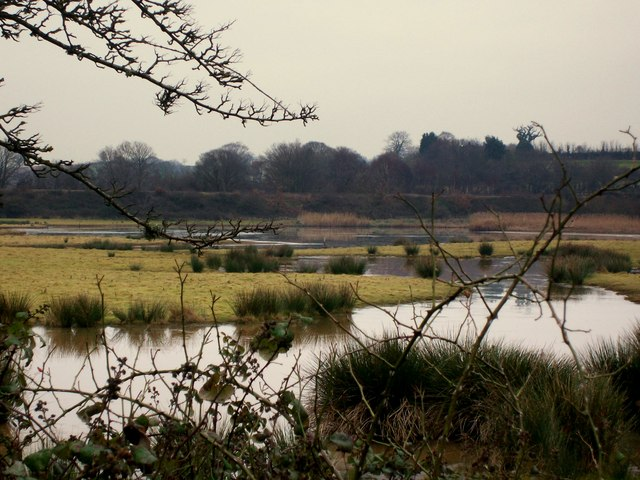
- RSPB Bowling Green Marsh
- Interactive map of RSPB Bowling Green Marsh
- Location: Topsham, Devon, England
- Coordinates: 50°40′42″N 3°27′20″W
- Operator: RSPB
- Website: rspb.org.uk/reserves/guide/b/bowlinggreenmarsh

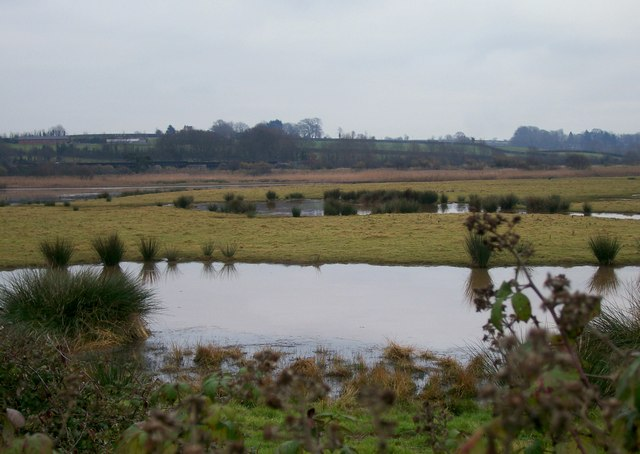
Bowling Green Marsh Nature Reserve Topsham2.

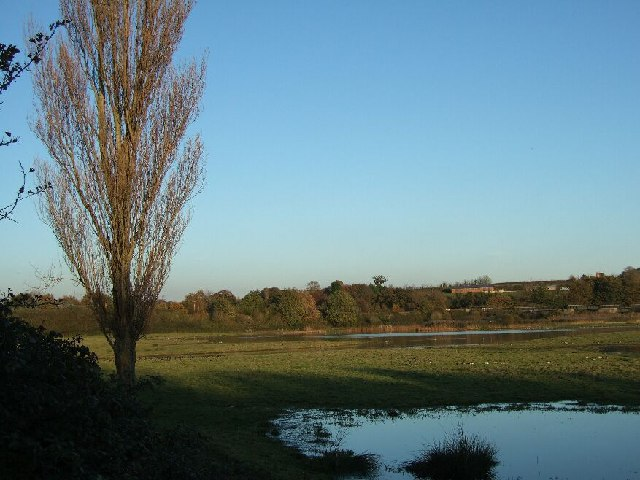
Bowling Green Marsh, Topsham; RSPB reserve.

Bowling Green Marsh is a nature reserve located on the confluence of the River Exe (at the top end of its estuary) and the River Clyst, near the town of Topsham in Devon. It is managed by the RSPB.

Migratory birds including Siberian brent geese, come to the marsh in the winter to feed. It is a major point of interest for birders across South West Britain, with many rare species present at any one time. Other visitors include osprey, wigeon, teal, avocet and black-tailed godwit, and many other waders. Several fish species inhabit the marsh's many pools. Otters have been sighted here, as well. There is a wheelchair-accessible bird hide on the marshes and a viewing platform, reached by steps, with views down the estuary. Occasionally, very rare vagrants, such as Barrow's goldeneye or king eider, stop at the marshes on their migration.
