= Topsham, Devon =

Town in Devon, England

Coordinates: 50.6860°N 3.4651°W

Topsham
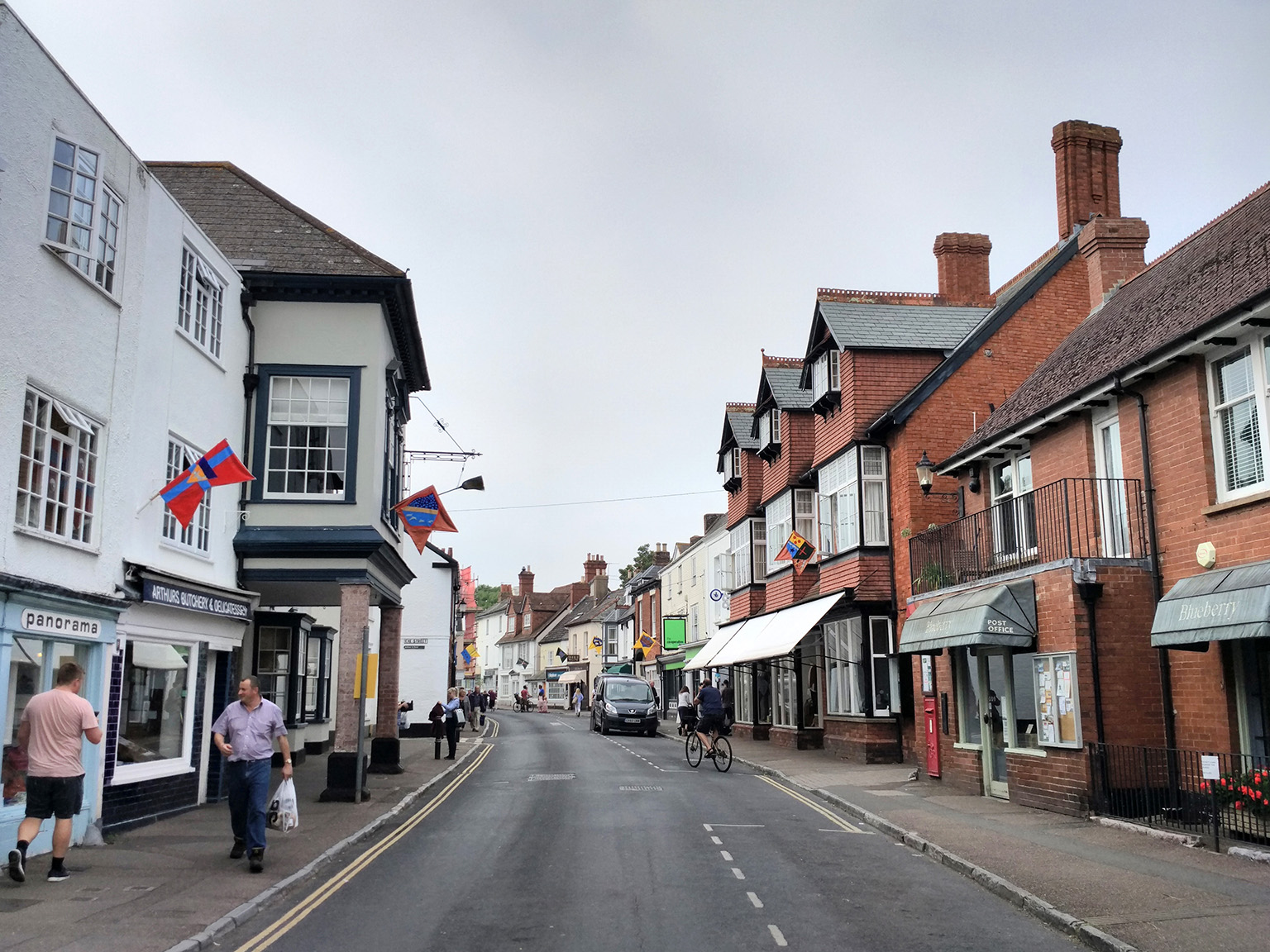
- Fore Street, Topsham

- Topsham district ward in Exeter

- Location within Devon
- Population: 4,146 (2021 census)
- OS grid reference: SX966884
- District: Exeter
- Shire county: Devon
- Region: South West
- Country: England
- Sovereign state: United Kingdom
- Post town: EXETER
- Postcode district: EX3
- Dialling code: 01392
- Police: Devon and Cornwall
- Fire: Devon and Somerset
- Ambulance: South Western
- UK Parliament: Exmouth and Exeter East

Topsham (/ˈtɒpʃəm/, also /ˈtɒpsəm/) is a town in the Exeter district, in Devon, England, located on the east side of the River Exe, immediately north of its confluence with the River Clyst and the former's estuary, between Exeter and Exmouth. Topsham is a historic port and was designated a town by a 1300 royal charter granted by Edward I; it was formally amalgamated into the City of Exeter in 1966. The population of the town, recorded at the 2021 census, is 4,146.

The town is served by Topsham railway station, about midway on the branch line from Exeter Central to Exmouth, now called the Avocet Line. 2011 saw the 150th anniversary of the railway coming to Topsham.

The electoral ward of Topsham extends further northwest and includes the east half of Countess Wear as well as the new suburb of Newcourt. The population of the ward, recorded at the 2021 census, is 10,038.

Topsham’s picturesque setting, range of independent shops, and lively community life makes it is one of the most desirable places to live in the South West of England.

== History ==
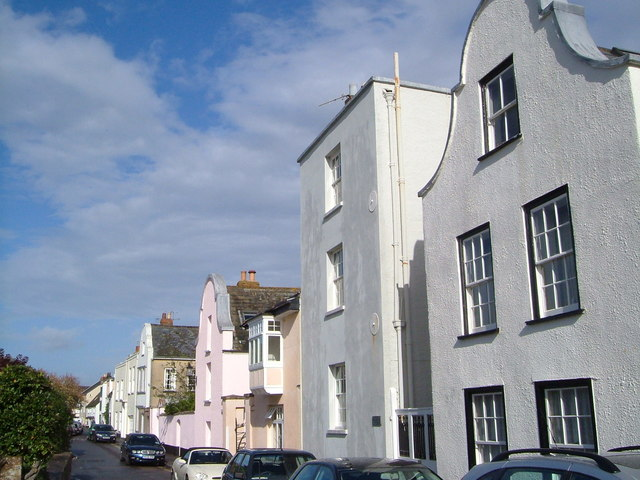
The Strand, showing houses with Dutch gables

=== Early origins ===
The site of Topsham originated as a Celtic settlement and became the port of the Roman city of Isca Dumnoniorum (Exeter) in the 1st century AD. It continued in this role until the end of Roman rule in southern Britain in the early 5th century. During the 7th century, under Saxon control in East Devon, the settlement developed into a substantial village.

St Margaret's Church dates from the 10th century and occupies land granted in 937 by King Æthelstan to the monastery of St Mary and St Peter in Exeter. The charter records the gift of "a parcel of land, i.e. a manse, which the vulgar called Toppesham", to be held in perpetuity. Although the building has been reconstructed several times, it remains on its original site.

=== Medieval and early modern period ===
Following the Norman Conquest, the manor of Topsham was granted by King Henry I to Richard de Redvers and formed part of the feudal barony of Plympton. The associated sub-manor of Weare later developed as a distinct estate.

Topsham was granted a royal charter in August 1300, permitting a weekly market and annual fair. This charter is commemorated by the town’s modern Charter Day festival.

In 1603, the manor formed part of the jointure lands granted to Anne of Denmark, consort of James VI and I, who held admiralty rights at the port. In July 1606, a cargo of tobacco from Venezuela, shipped via Trinidad in the Delight, was unloaded at Topsham; following the death of its owner en route to Exeter, ownership of the cargo passed to the queen.

The town was the site of a Parliamentarian naval assault during the English Civil War.

=== Maritime prosperity and built environment ===
Owing to its sheltered position on the River Exe, Topsham developed into a significant port, with activities including fishing, shipbuilding, and overseas trade. During the 17th and 18th centuries it became particularly associated with the wool and cotton trade with the Netherlands.

Many houses in the town were constructed using imported Dutch brick used as ballast, and feature architectural elements such as Dutch gables.

Notable vessels built at Topsham include HMS Terror, later part of Franklin's lost expedition, and HMS Cyane, subsequently commissioned into the United States Navy as USS Cyane.

The Weare manor house at Weare was rebuilt in about 1804 in Georgian style by Sir John Duckworth, 1st Baronet, and is now part of Exeter Golf and Country Club.

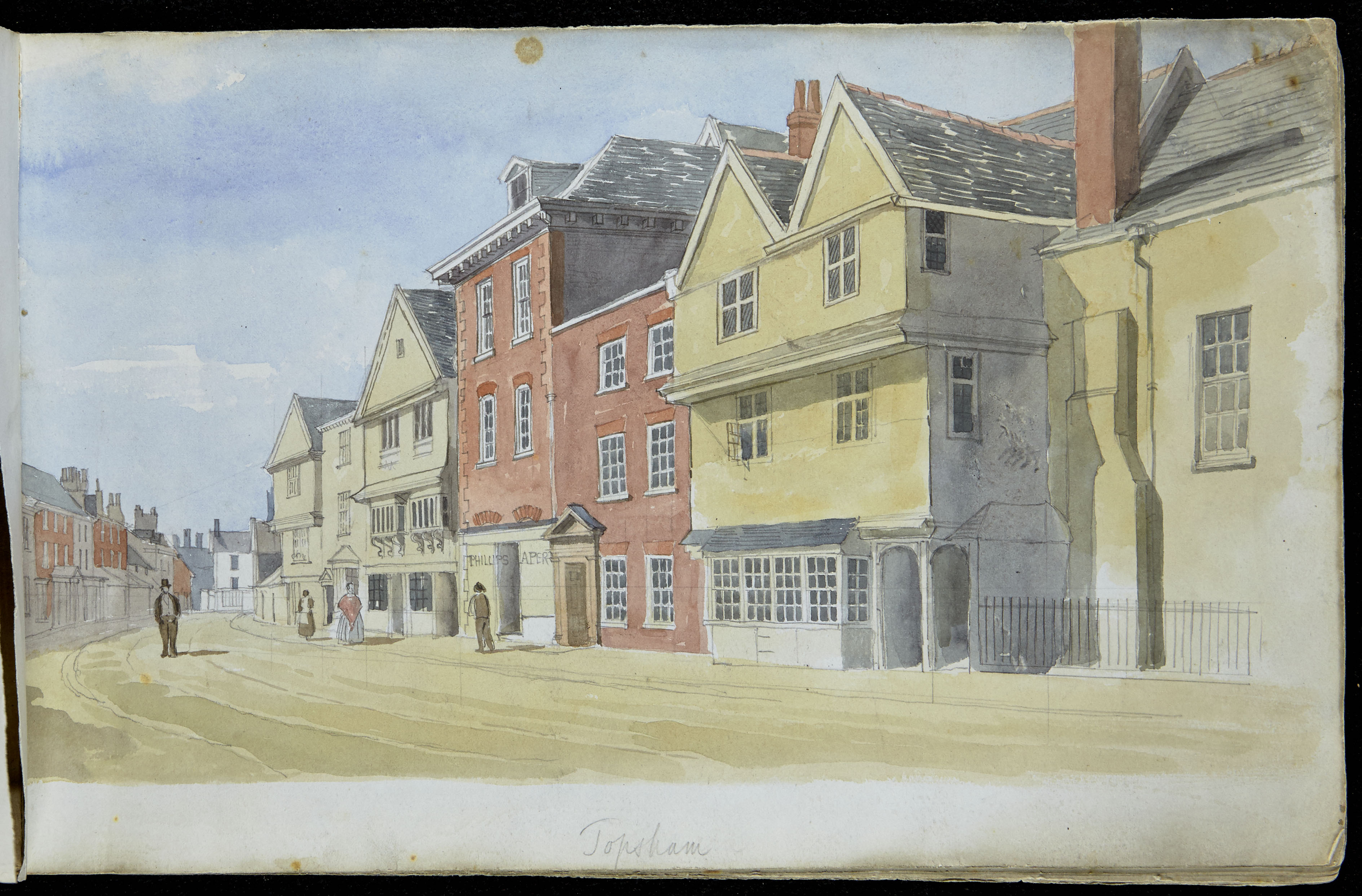
Topsham High Street, Devon, watercolour by Edward Ashworth, c. 1843–1933

=== Modern period ===
After a period of decline during the early 20th century, Topsham gradually became an increasingly desirable residential area.

On 1 April 1966, the civil parish of Topsham was abolished and incorporated into Exeter; parts were transferred to Clyst St George and Woodbury. Prior to this, it had formed part of St Thomas Rural District. At the 1961 census, the parish recorded a population of 3,963.

Infrastructure development included the completion in 1977 of the final section of the M5 motorway, which passes along the western edge of the town and crosses the River Exe.

In the 21st century, development has taken place in the 'Topsham Gap', an area of greenfield land between Topsham and Exeter. The population increased from 3,545 in 2001 to 3,730 in 2011 and 4,146 in 2021.

== Today ==
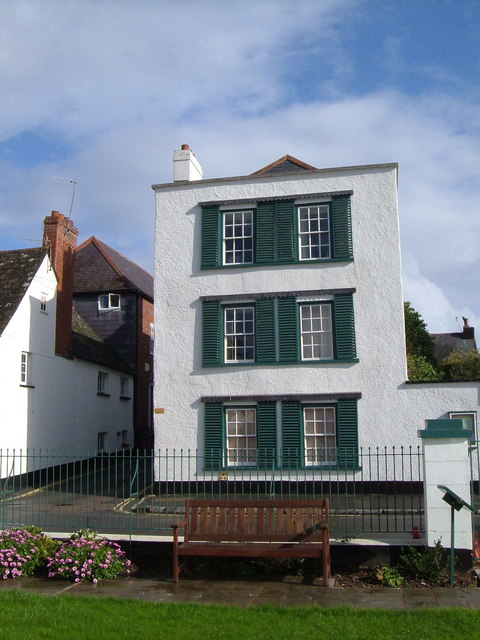
Topsham Museum

Formerly a major seaport, the town is now of interest for its architecture, scenery and proximity to nature reserves for wading and migrating birds, such as RSPB Bowling Green Marsh on the Exe Estuary, the whole of which is a Site of Special Scientific Interest (SSSI).

Topsham Museum is located in one of a set of 17th century buildings looking out over the Exe Estuary. It consists of furnished period rooms, displays of the local history of the town and memorabilia of Vivien Leigh, the film star.

In 2021, the Sunday Times national newspaper named Topsham "one of the best places to live".

National Cycle Route 2 passes through the town. In November 2013, a new bridge opened that forms part of a new route for cyclists and pedestrians which crosses the River Clyst and connects the town with Ebford and Exton.

== Name and pronunciation ==
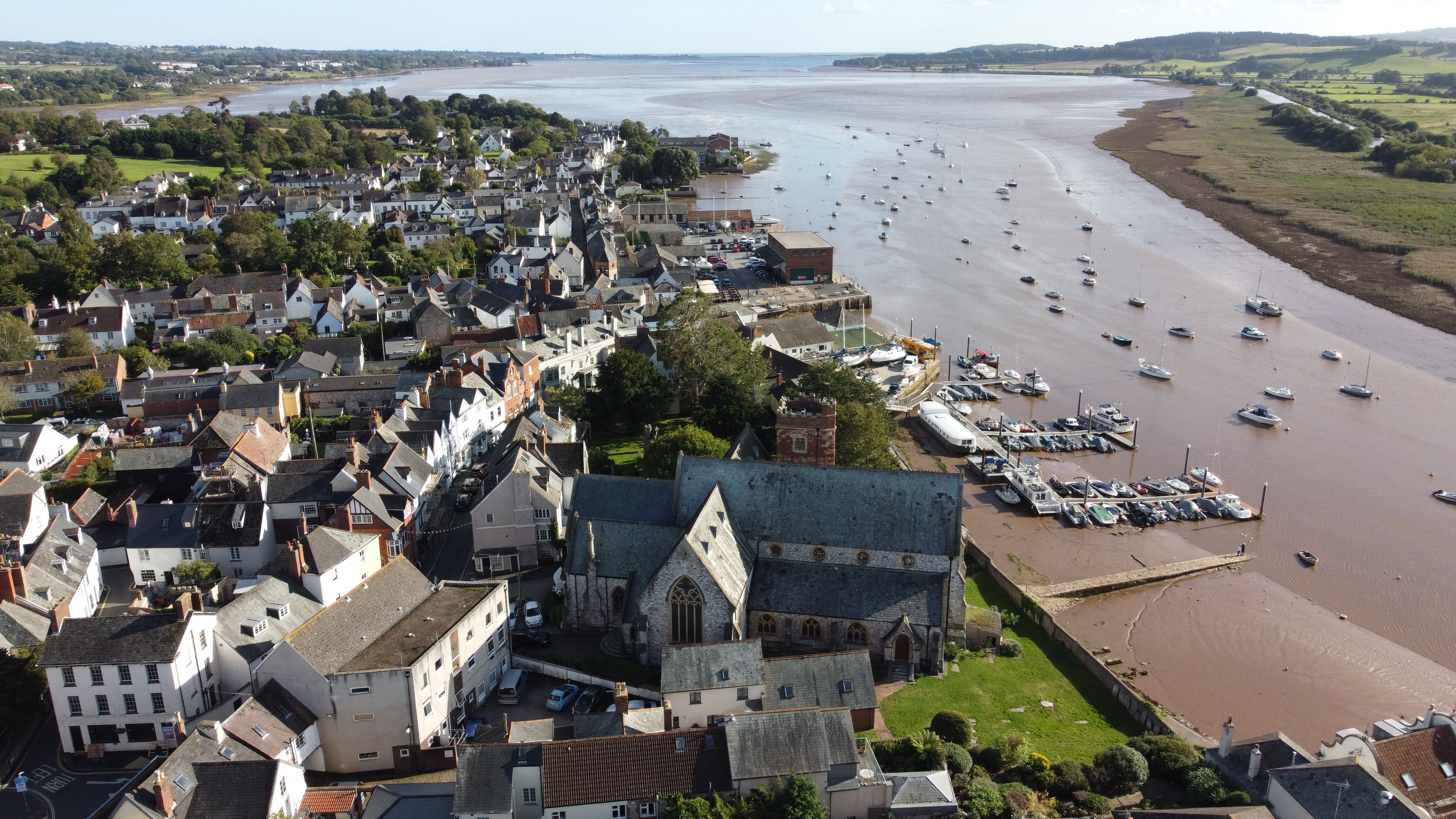
Topsham, the River Exe and Exeter Canal, looking south

The name is an Anglo-Saxon one, and means Toppa's village, Toppa having been the local landowner.

There are two pronunciations of the town's name. Generally it is referred to as /ˈtɒpʃəm/ with the sh sounded as in shoe. The local pronunciation, especially amongst older residents, is /ˈtɒpsəm/ with an s rather than sh sound.

In the United States, Topsham, Maine and Topsham, Vermont were named for the English town.

== Sport ==
Topsham's local football club is Topsham Town FC, a non-league side playing in the Devon Football League. Topsham Rugby Club has two men's senior sides, one women's senior side and over 200 juniors making it one of the largest "junior" clubs in the South West. Topsham's men's team secured promotion in the 21/22 season before following it up a year later winning the league to be promoted again. This coupled with winning the Devon Intermediate Cup by beating Tiverton helped the club record its best ever season. The town also has a bowling club, an outdoor swimming pool, a cricket club (Topsham St. James CC) and a sailing club.

== Community and recreation ==
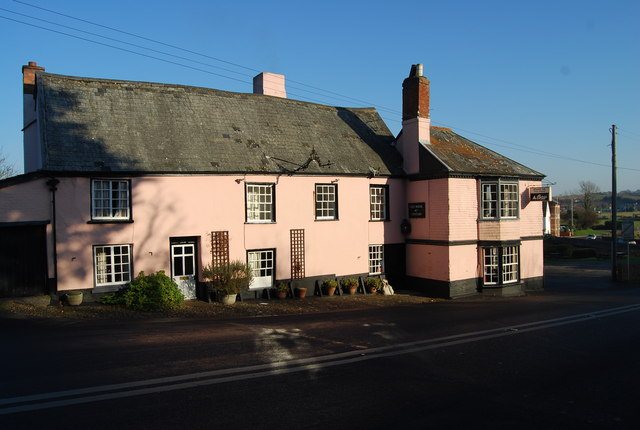
The Bridge Inn, by the River Clyst, which flows by the east side of Topsham

One of the main focal points of the town is Topsham Pool. Topsham Pool is a community run project in the centre of the town. It was funded by a large fundraising exercise in the 1970s which included collecting waste paper and glass bottles, jumble sales and donations. A Sports Council grant completed the fund raising effort and, in 1979, the pool was opened by Olympic gold medallist swimmer David Wilkie. Topsham Pool is an open-air pool and, as a result, is only open between May and September. Between 6 am and 8.30 am each morning, the Pool welcomes the Nutters Club – a group that swims when the outside temperature is likely to be at its coolest.

In response to what had been described in the early 1960s as "a period of genteel decline", The Topsham Society was formed. The objectives of the Topsham Society are "To promote high standards of planning and architecture in or affecting Topsham; to educate the public in the geography, history, natural history and architecture of Topsham; to secure the preservation protection development and improvement of features of historic or public interest in Topsham". The Society currently has around 400 members.

In addition to St Margaret's Anglican church, there is also a Methodist church situated in Fore Street, a Congregational Church situated in Victoria Road, and a Roman Catholic church, dedicated to the Holy Cross, which meets in Station Road.

The Bridge Inn is a grade II listed public house at Bridge Hill, that dates to the 18th century. It is on the Campaign for Real Ale's National Inventory of Historic Pub Interiors. It was visited by Elizabeth II in 1998.

A monthly magazine is published called Estuary: A Monthly Community Magazine for Topsham, which is published by St Margaret's Anglican Church, but is more of a community publication than an ecclesiastical one. It is currently priced £2 per month, and a copy is to be received by the 15th of the preceding month. It is co-edited by Diana Trout and José Northey.

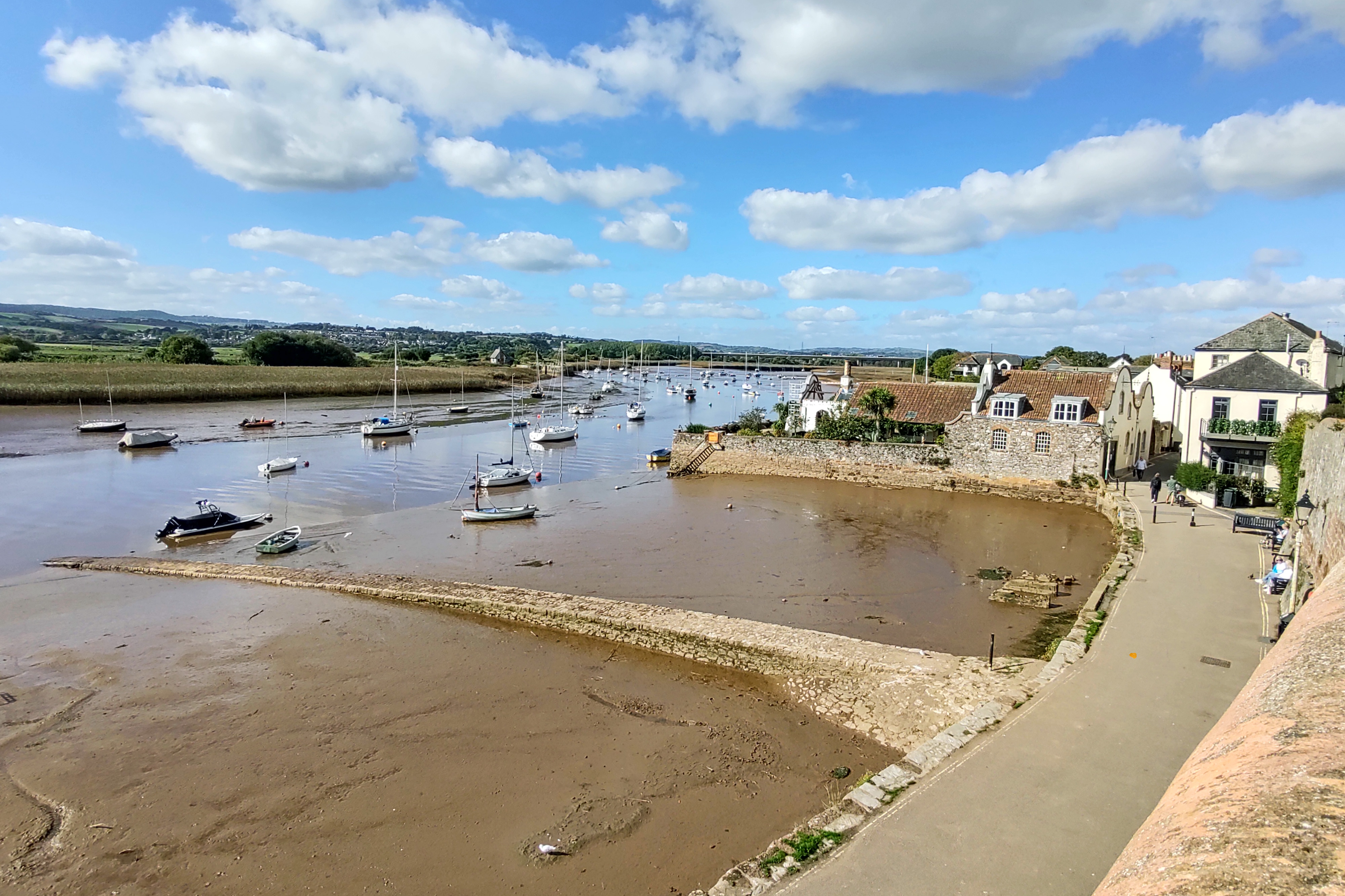
The River Exe at Topsham – in the background is the M5 bridge. A ferry takes passengers to the other side, where there is the Exeter Canal

There is a community centre called the Matthews Hall located in the centre of the town, provided by the Topsham Community Association. Local groups can use this facility, and these include the Topsham Film Club and the Topsham Flower Club. Twice a year, Estuary Players present a theatrical production in the Matthews Hall. They are a notably eclectic group, but Shakespeare and Brecht have featured among their favourite playwrights over their 35-year existence. The Community Association also run a Saturday market, held at the Matthews Hall, and appoint the town crier.

Topsham Art Group had a summer exhibition in 2012 at The Topsham School featuring local artists.

2011 marked the 80th anniversary of the Topsham Town Fayre and Carnival. As of 2018 there is no longer a Carnival. Every two years, the town holds a Longest Table event, which involves tables being placed end to end through the streets with people bringing food for their own table.

The Estuary League of Friends charity supports elderly people in the local community.

== Notable people ==
- William Webb Follett (1796–1845), lawyer and politician, was born in Topsham.
- Richard Sainthill (1787–1870), numismatist and author.
- George Warren (c. 1801–1884), British Army general, was born in the town.
- Tryphena Sparks (1851–1890), cousin of Thomas Hardy, lived in Topsham and is buried there; she is associated with Hardy’s poem Thoughts of Phena at News of Her Death.
- Francis William Locke Ross (1793–1860), Royal Navy officer and antiquarian, lived at Broadway House in Topsham and assembled a significant collection of artefacts later transferred to Exeter museums.
- Dick Pym (1893–1988), footballer, was born in Topsham and played in the 1923 FA Cup Final.
- Trevor McDonald (b. 1939), television newsreader, has lived in Topsham.
- Show of Hands (formed 1987), folk music duo, are based in Topsham.
- Clifford Fishwick (1923–1997), artist and principal of Exeter College of Art and Design, lived in the town.
- Bill Pertwee (1926–2013), actor known for Dad's Army, lived in Topsham.
- Philip Hensher (b. 1965), novelist, lives in Topsham; his novel King of the Badgers (2011) is set in a fictional town based on it.
- Hester Frood (1883–1974), artist, lived in Topsham and is buried there.
- Norman Croucher (b. 1941), mountaineer and disability sports pioneer, is a resident.
- Vivian Stanshall (1943–1995), musician and writer, lived in Topsham and died there.

=== Associated with Topsham ===
- Vivian Leigh (1913–1967), actress, was associated with Topsham through her marriage to Leigh Holman and visits to the town.
