= Wynard's Hospital =

Building in Exeter, Devon, England

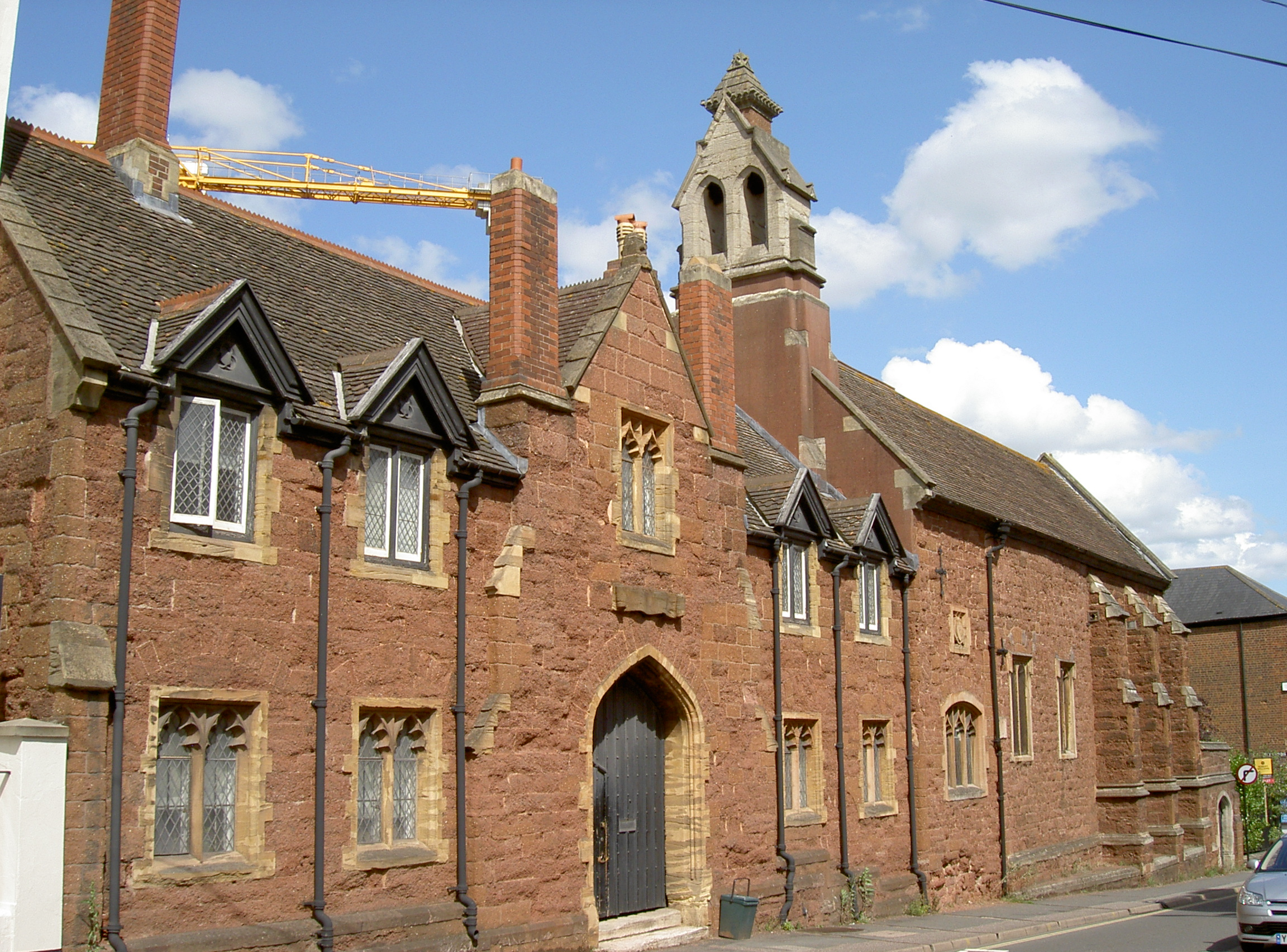
- Wynard's Hospital in 2014

General information
- Type: Almshouses
- Architectural style: Gothic
- Town or city: Exeter
- Country: England
- Coordinates: 50°43′14″N 3°31′36″W
- Year(s) built: 1435
- Renovated: 1863

Technical details
- Material: Heavitree stone

Renovating team
- Architect(s): Edward Ashworth

Wynard's Hospital, also known as Wynard's Almshouses or Wynards, is a collection of buildings in Exeter, Devon, originally founded in 1435 as almshousesfor the poor and sick. It is Grade II* listed.

== Architecture ==
Wynard's Hospital is composed of twelve two-storey almshouses (now private dwellings) and a chapel, all built of Heavitree stone, around a cobbled courtyard. Entrance to the courtyard from the road is through a central Gothic arch.

Pevsner described Ashworth's work as having restored Wynard's Hospital 'to a picturesque medieval appearance', and noted 'their aesthetic appeal'.

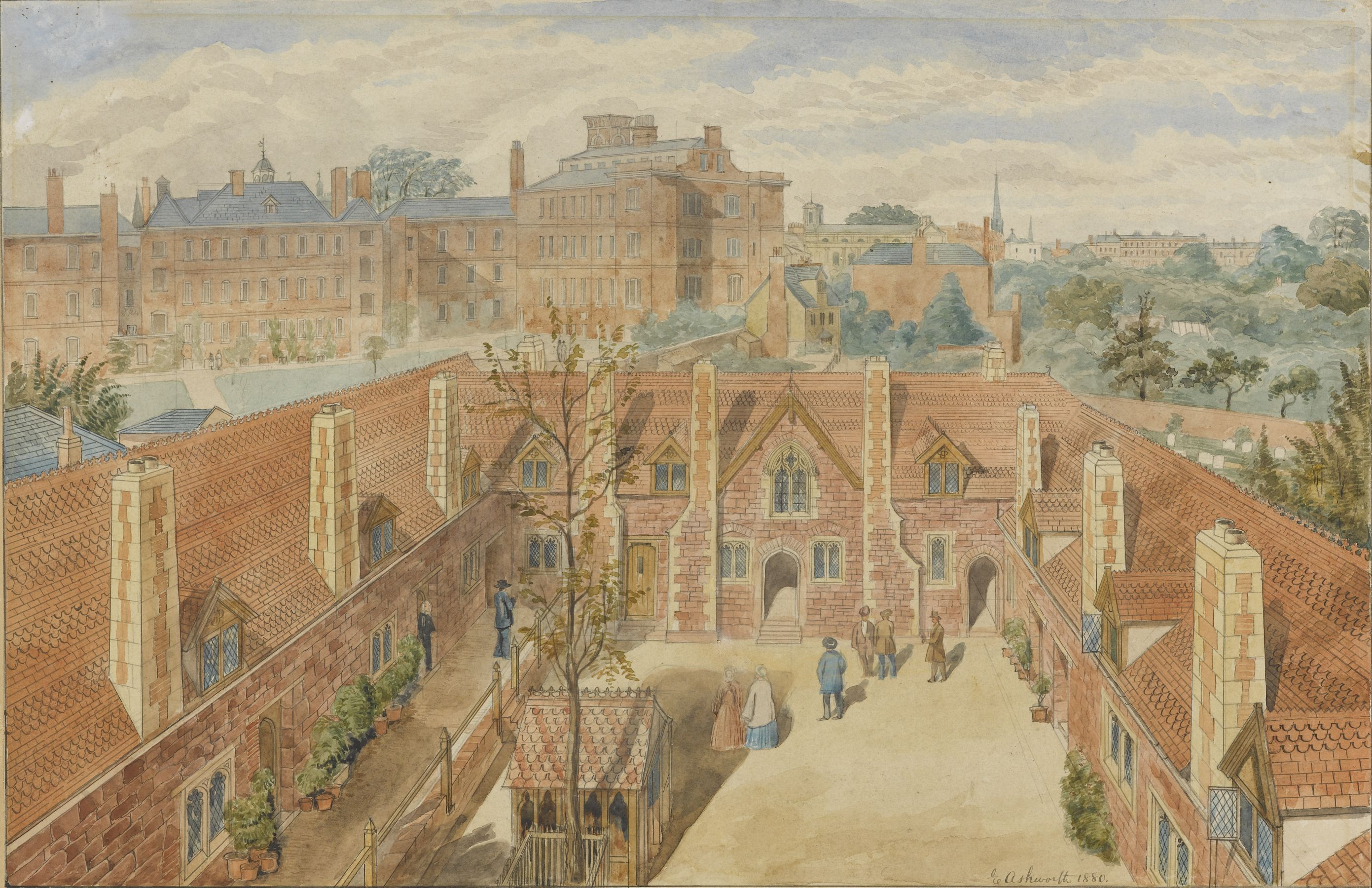
An 1880 watercolour of Wynard's Hospital by Edward Ashworth

== History ==
The almshouses and chapel were endowed by William Wynard, Recorder of Exeter between 1404 and 1442. It has been suggested some of his wealth came from the proceeds of piracy.

Wynard's Hospital was restored in the 17th century after taking damage in the Civil War, and again in 1863 by Edward Ashworth. By 1929, the provision for the poor at Wynard's Hospital had become known as 'one of the ancient customs' of Exeter.

In 1973, Wynard's Hospital was restored for use as offices for Exeter City Council, having narrowly escaped demolition in the 1960s. Over the following two decades, Wynard's Hospital housed Marriage Guidance, Samaritans, Citizens Advice Bureau, the Council for Alcoholism, Pre-School Playgroups, Tapes for the Handicapped and the Young People's Counselling Service. In 2001, they were sold by the council and converted for use as private dwellings before being sold on the open market.
