= Edward Ashworth =

English painter

Edward Ashworth (1814 – 1896) was an English artist and architect from Devon, England, considered to be the West Country's leading ecclesiastical architect. He was elected a member of the Exeter Diocesan Architectural Society in 1847.

== Origins ==
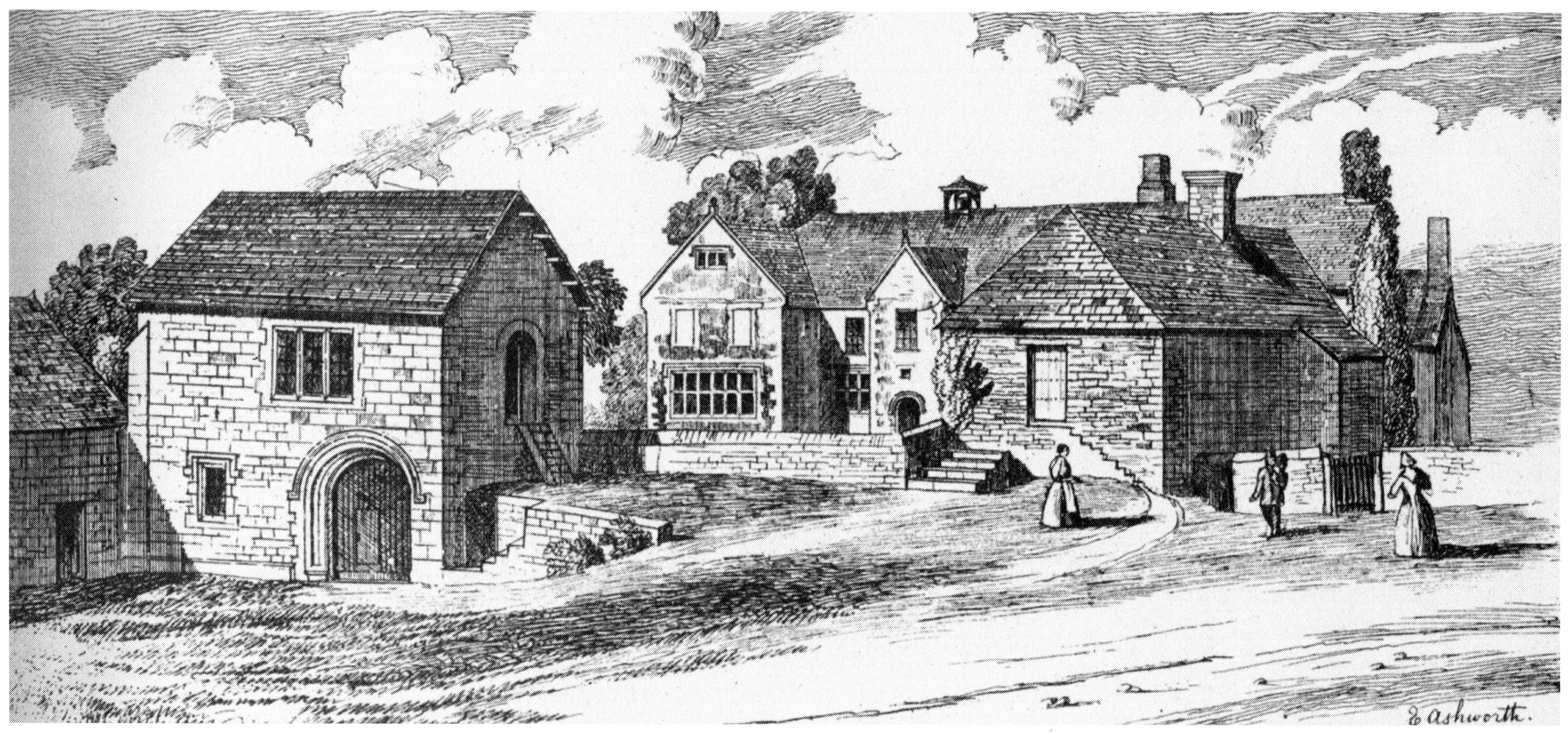
1892 signed drawing by Edward Ashworth (1815–1892) of his childhood home Colleton Barton, Chulmleigh, Devon

He was born in 1814 at Colleton Barton, in the parish of Chulmleigh in Devon.

Ashworth trained under Robert Cornish.

== Career ==
He left Colleton in 1822 and later moved to London where he became a pupil of the architect Charles Fowler (1792–1867), born in Cullompton, Devon. During 1842-46 Ashworth travelled in New Zealand, Australia, Timor, Macau and Hong Kong during which time he kept diaries and sketchbooks. Following his return to England in 1846 he set up an architectural practice in Exeter, Devon. In later life he lived at Dix's Field in Exeter. He rebuilt or restored many churches in Devon, including:

=== Rebuilding works ===
- Cullompton, Devon (1849)
- Dulverton, Somerset (1852–55)
- Bideford, Devon (1859)
- Lympstone, Devon (1862)
- St Mary's, Bideford, Devon (1862–65)
- Withycombe Raleigh, Exmouth, Devon (1863–64)
- St Mary Major, Exeter, Devon (1865), now demolished
- St Margaret's Church, Topsham (1874)
- Milton Combe (1878)
- St Nicholas Church, Exeter (opposite St Nicholas Priory) (design of)

=== Restoration works ===
- St Michael and All Angels Church, Bude, Cornwall
- St Peter's Church, Tiverton, Devon
- Silverton
- Lapford
- Widecombe
- Axminster
- Doddiscombsleigh
- North Molton
- Wynards Almshouses, Exeter (1863)

=== Literary works ===
- Chinese Architecture (1851), with his illustrations

=== Paintings and drawings ===
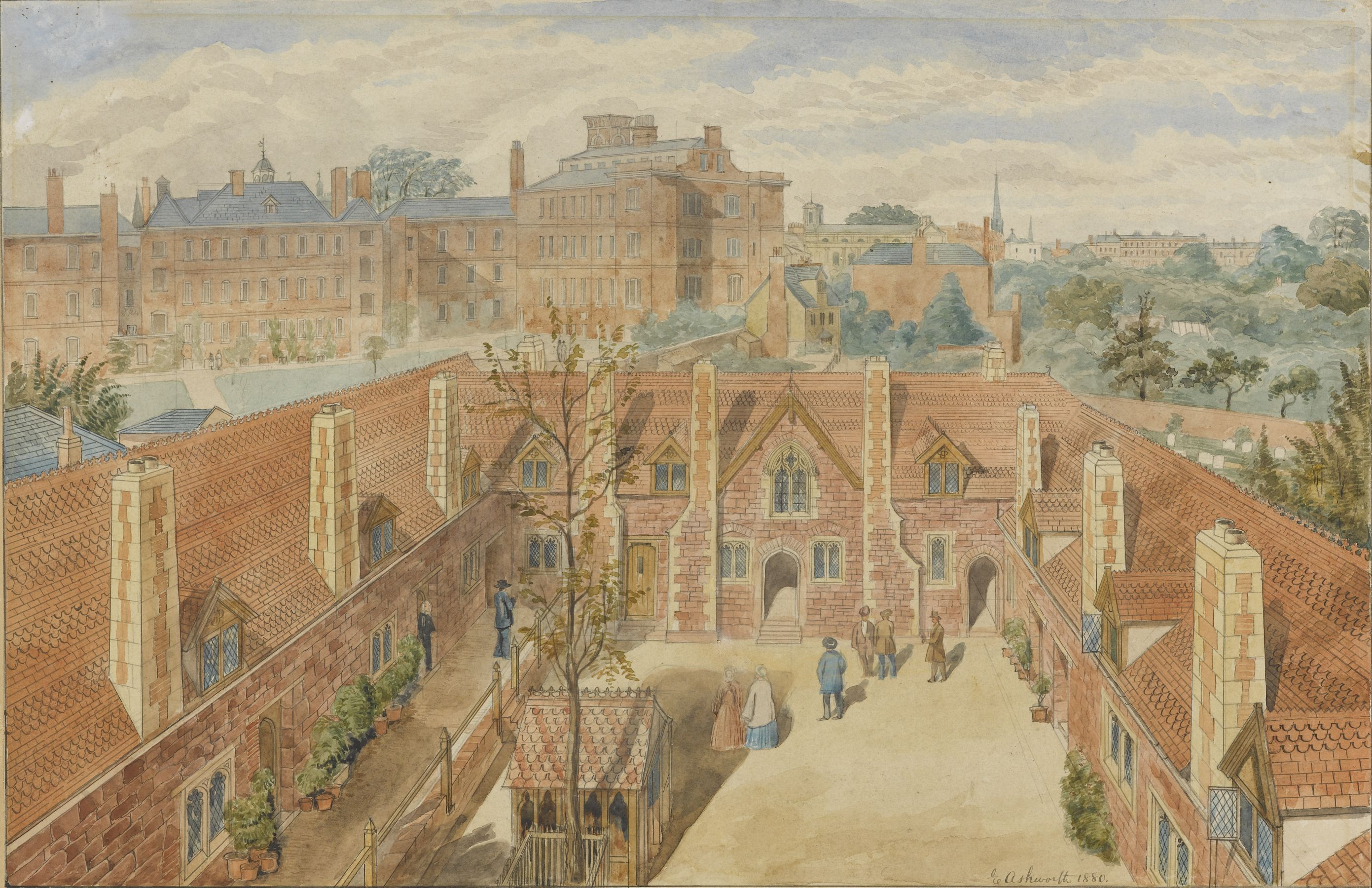
A Bird's Eye View of Wynards Hospital, Exeter (1880). This watercolour shows Wynard's Hospital on Magdalen Street. Wynard's was founded as almshouses for the poor and infirm of Exeter in 1435. They continued to house the poor until 1973 when they became council offices, today they have been converted to private housing. From the Royal Albert Memorial Museum's collection (215/1970)

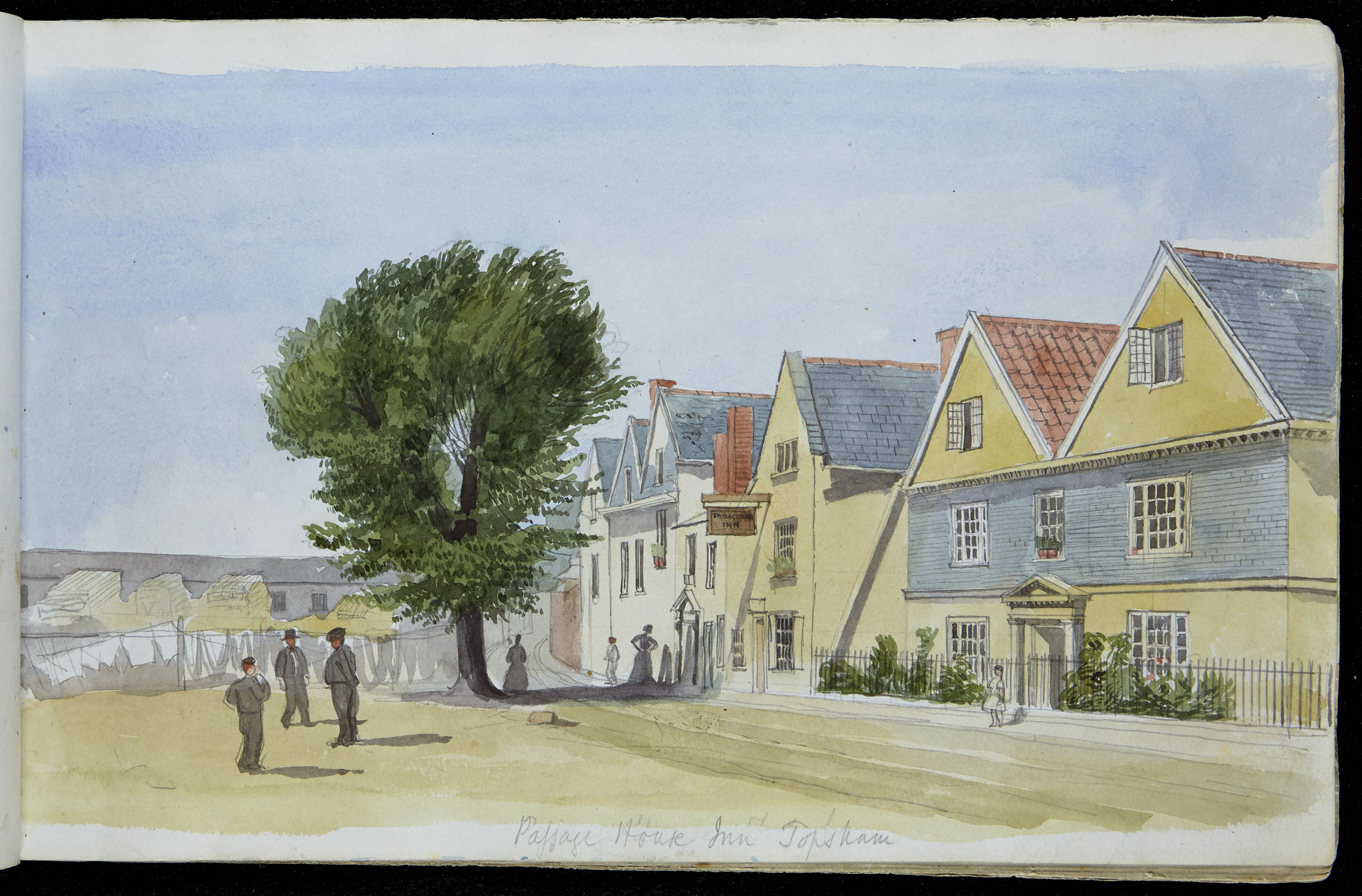
Passage House Inn, Topsham, watercolour by Edward Ashworth between 1843 and 1933. From the Devon and Exeter Institution

Many of his drawings and paintings are held in the collection of the Westcountry Studies Library, Exeter, at the Devon and Exeter Institution and Devon Record Office.

== Death and burial ==
He died on 8 March 1896 and left a substantial estate valued at £26,814, mainly invested in Railway stocks. He was buried in the newly created Higher Cemetery, Exeter, for which he had designed two lodges and one chapel. His ornate stone cross, made of pink stone, survives and was restored circa 2010.
