= Staniford =

Staniford is an English surname. Notable people with the surname include:

- Frank Staniford (1893–1987), Australian politician
- Michaela Staniford (born 1987), English rugby union player
- Tom Staniford (born 1989), English para-cyclist
