= St Margaret's Church, Topsham =

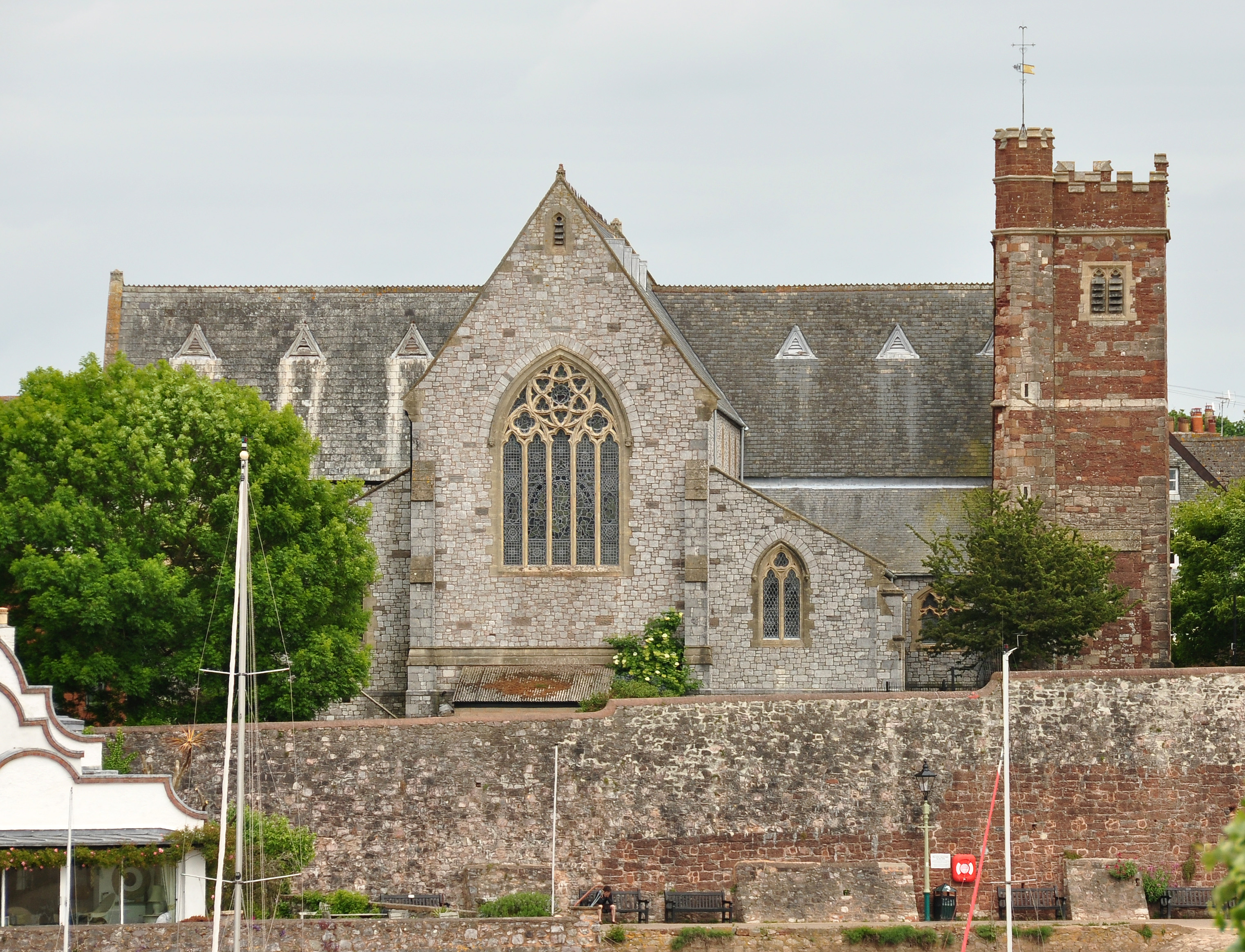
- St Margaret's Church from the River Exe

- 50.68283066181839°N 3.4655428214461206°W,
- OS grid reference: SX 96537 88029
- Country: England
- Denomination: Church of England
- Churchmanship: Central churchmanship
- Website: www.achurchnearyou.com/church/8641/

History
- Status: Operational
- Dedication: St Margaret of Antioch

Architecture
- Heritage designation: Grade II* listed
- Architect: Edward Ashworth
- Style: Gothic and Gothic Revival
- Years built: 14th & 19th century

Specifications
- Materials: Limestone and Heavitree stone

Administration
- Province: Canterbury
- Diocese: Exeter
- Archdeaconry: Exeter
- Parish: Topsham

Clergy
- Vicar: Revd Louise Grace

St Margaret's Church in Topsham, Devon, is a parish church in the Church of England. It is a Grade II* listed building composed of a 14th-century Gothic tower and a 19th-century Gothic Revival main structure.

== Building ==
The Perpendicular Gothic tower was built in the 14th century from Heavitree stone, the lower part having by repute required repair after damage in the English Civil War. The main body of the church was rebuilt in the Gothic Revival style from limestone in 1874-6 by Edward Ashworth at a cost of £8,550. The building is dedicated to St Margaret of Antioch. There have been four different church or chapel buildings on this site. There are 65 vaults or graves under the current church.

The church contains a distinctive Norman font, and the stained glass is Victorian and Edwardian, including work by Burlison and Grylls described by Nikolaus Pevsner as 'one of their best in Devon'.

== Memorials ==
There are two Greek Revival monuments of black and white marble by Sir Francis Chantrey, dedicated to Admiral Sir John Duckworth and his son Lt. Col. George Duckworth.

There is a memorial stone to Thomas Randle, who served on HMS Victory with Lord Nelson.

The oldest tombstone is from 1524, marking the resting place of Mathew Mongey, a successful Exeter merchant.

Topsham War Memorial stands by the main road near the church's east entrance. It was built, of granite, as a memorial to 69 parishioners who died in the First World War memorial in 1920, then altered after the Second World War, adding the names of 23 parishioners who died in that conflict. It is separately Grade II Listed.

== Current day ==
The church works in close partnership with the nearby church of St Luke's, Countess Wear. The church hosts regular visiting musicians for recitals. The church is registered with the Charity Commission for England and Wales.
