= Colleton, Chulmleigh =

Hamlet in Devon, England

Coordinates: 50.916°N 3.895°W

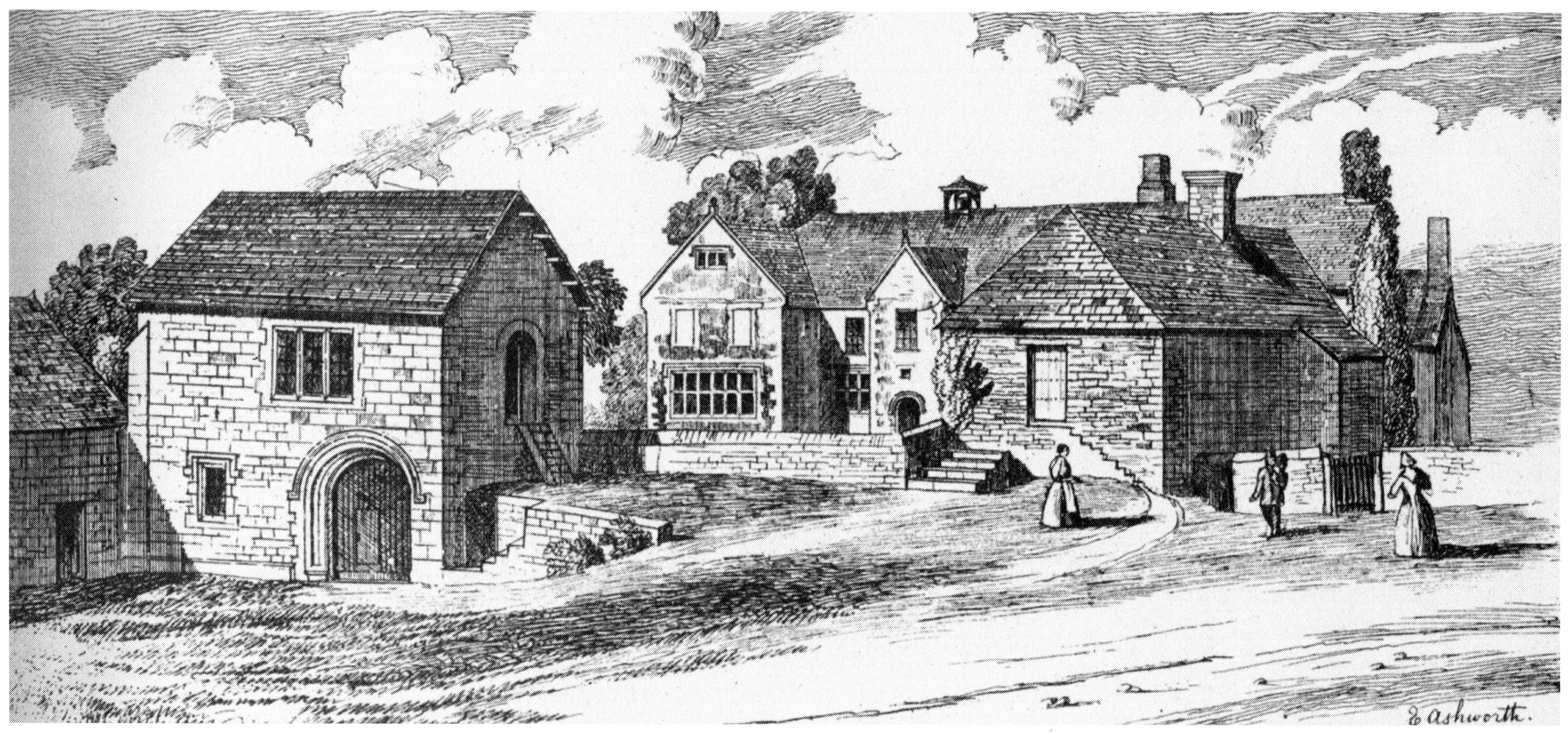
1892 signed drawing by the ecclesiastical architect Edward Ashworth (1815–1892) of his childhood home Colleton Barton, Chulmleigh, Devon. View from south-east

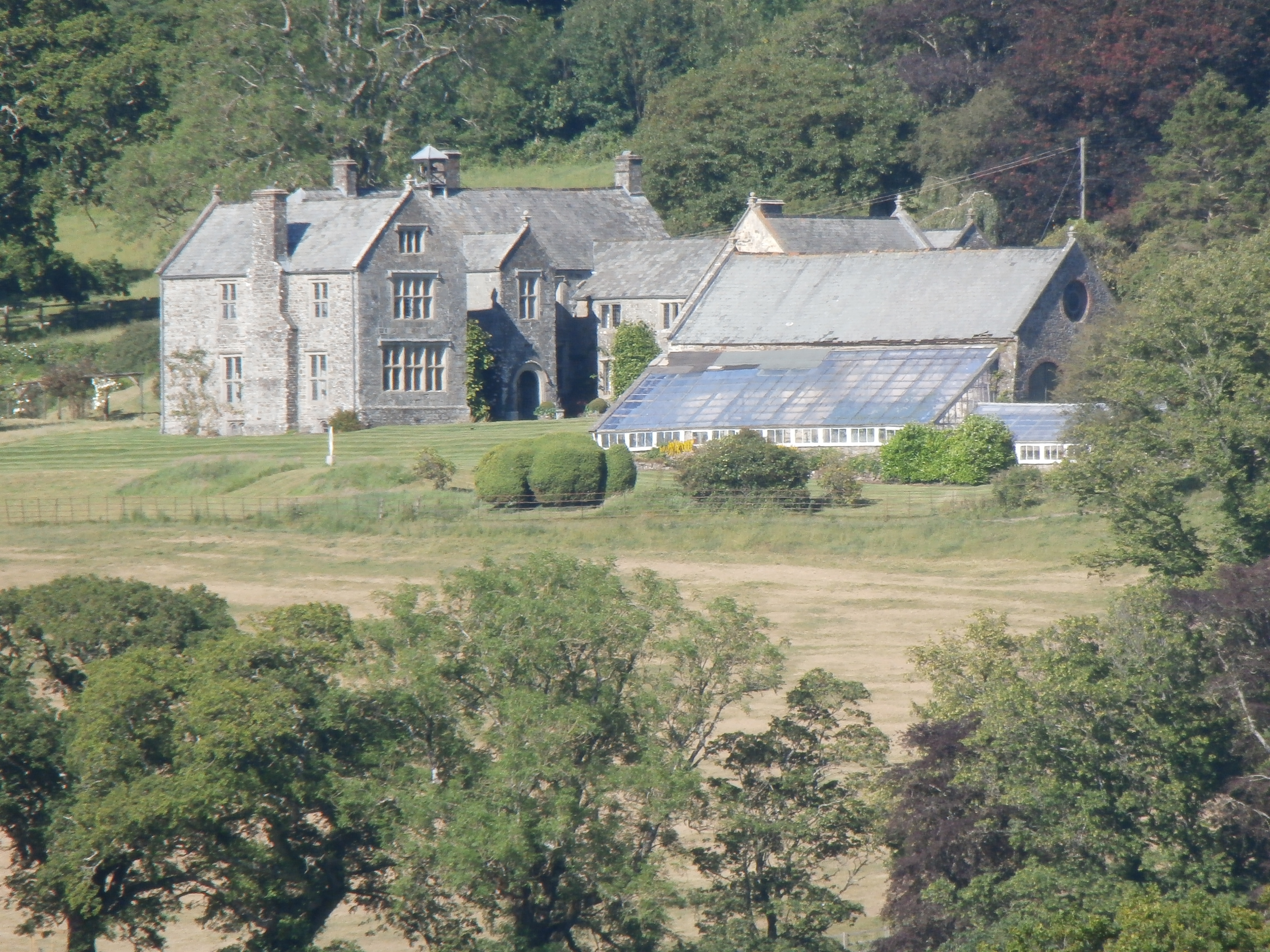
Colleton Barton viewed from south-west across the River Taw

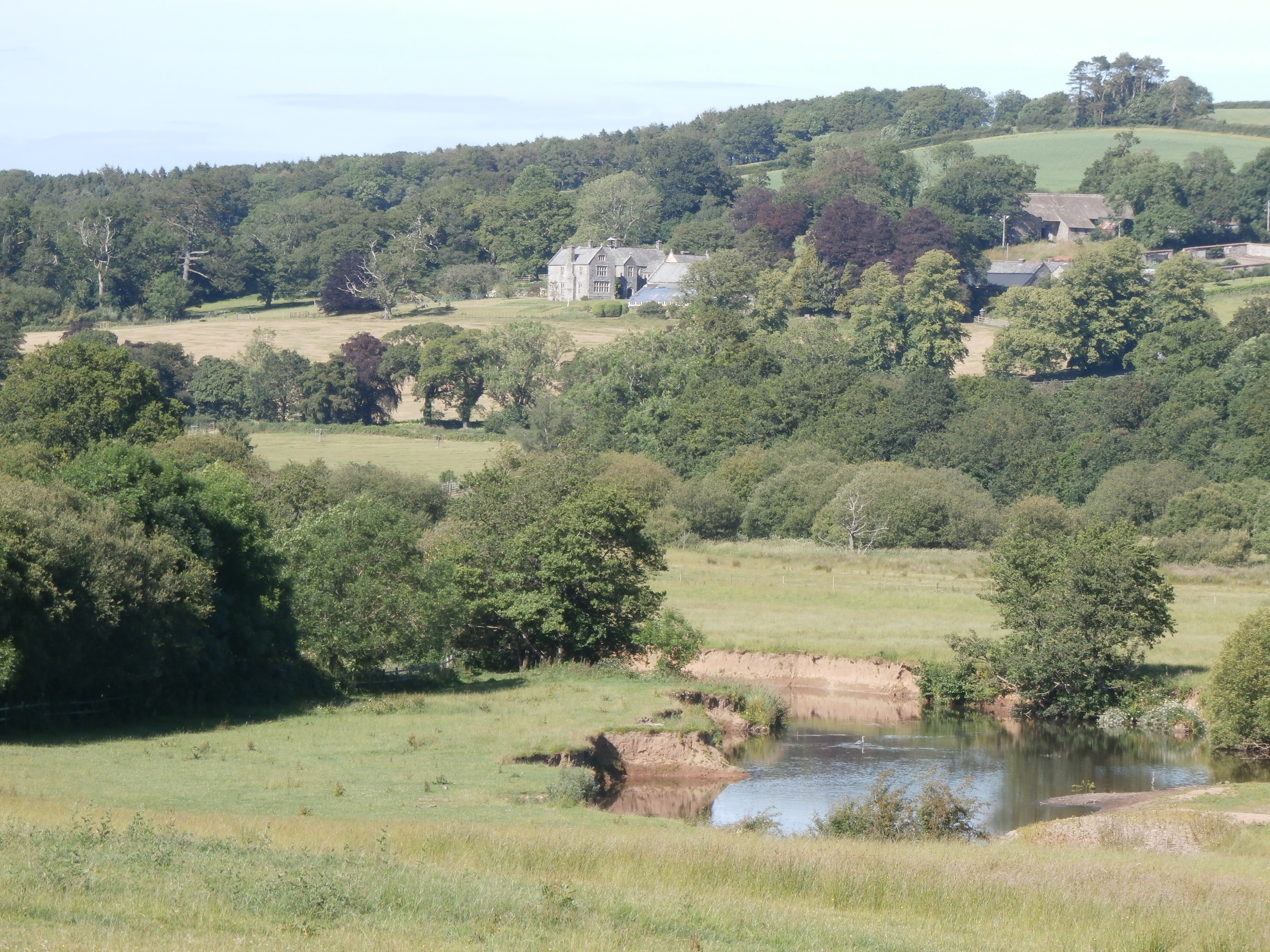
Colleton Barton viewed from south west, showing the River Taw in the valley bottom

Colleton is a hamlet and former manor in the civil parish and ecclesiastical parish of Chulmleigh, in the North Devon district of Devon, England. It is situated on the north side of a valley containing the River Taw. Its nearest town is Chulmleigh, which lies approximately 3.6 miles (5.8 km) to the south-west. It consists of the grade I listed Colleton Barton (the former manor house) and Colleton Mill, the former manorial mill, with another former industrial building situated at the approach to the bridge over the River Taw.

== History ==
=== Ownership ===
According to Pole (died 1635), the earliest records pertaining to ownership of the manor relate to the Cole family, Risdon stated it to have remained in the possession of that family for many generations, until during the reign of King Richard II (1377–1399) it passed by inheritance to an heir general of the Bury family. The last of the Bury family died in 1804, and the property was inherited by Vice-Admiral Richard Incledon (1757–1825), third son of Chichester Incledon (1715–1771) of Barnstaple, a junior branch of the ancient gentry family of Incledon of Incledon, later of Buckland, both in the parish of Braunton, Devon; as required under the terms of his inheritance, he assumed the surname of Bury. Incledon-Bury's third daughter and heiress, Penelope, married Rev. John Russell (1795–1883) (Jack Russell), the "Sporting Parson", vicar of Swimbridge, who developed the Jack Russell Terrier, a variety of the Fox Terrier breed. Russell is said to have had expensive sporting habits both on and off the hunting-field, which drained the substantial resources of his heiress wife and left the estate of Colleton in poor condition. By 1850, Colleton Barton was in use as a farmhouse, which status it retained in 1883.

The property was bought in 1901 by William Pethebridge Martin (1859–1935); since 1987, Colleton has been owned by Simon and Grania Phillips, who have carried out much restoration work and have been rearing North Devon cattle on the estate since about 2000.

== Buildings ==
=== Gatehouse and chapel ===
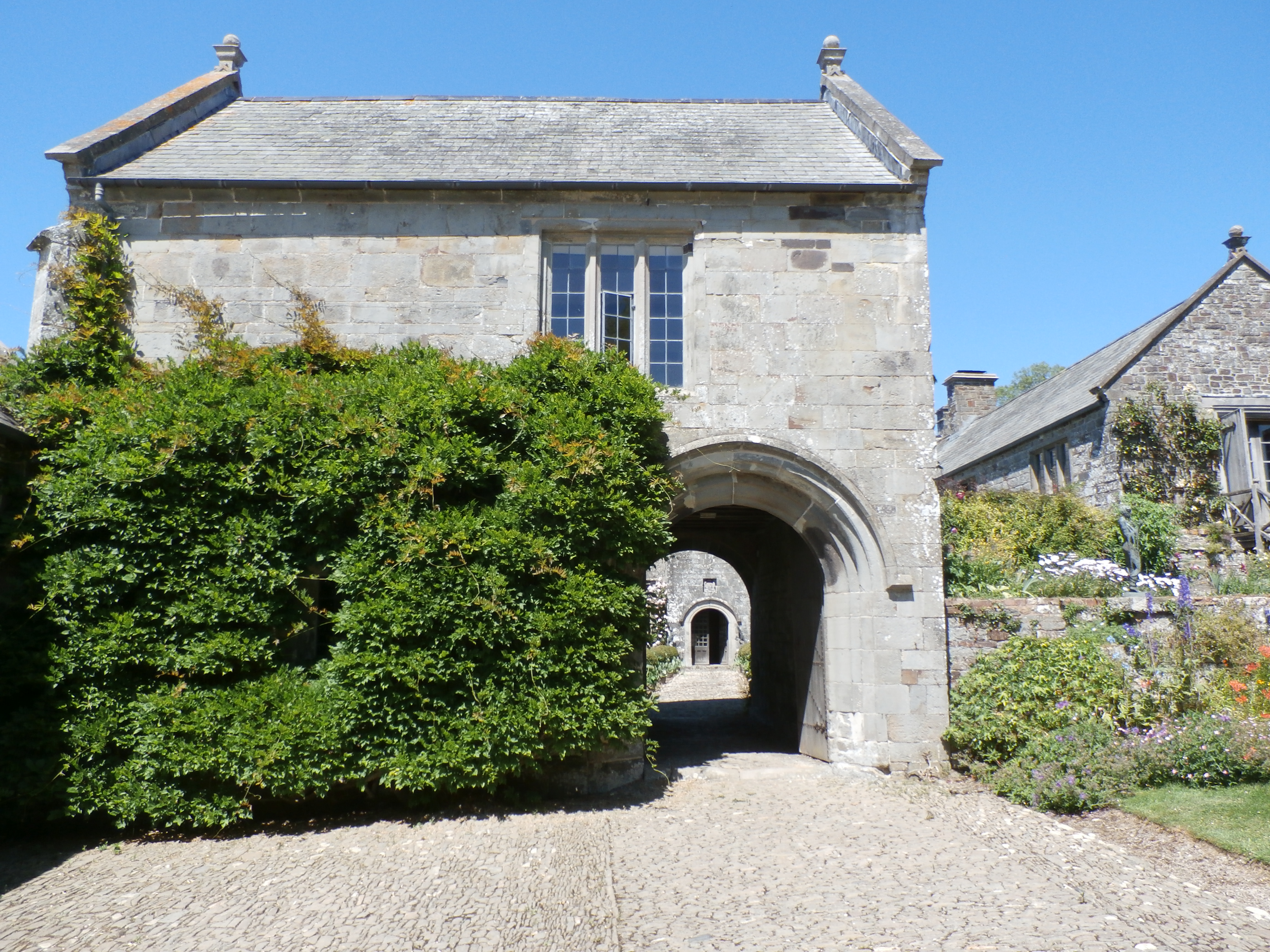
Gatehouse, Colleton Barton, viewed from south, with front door to Colleton Barton visible through gateway beyond

The Gatehouse is probably C15, remodelled in circa C16 or early C17, with minor alterations probably of the early C19 and was repaired in C20. Formerly occupying the upper floor was a chapel dedicated to St. Edmund of Canterbury (Edmund Rich (1175–1240), Archbishop of Canterbury (1233–1240), canonised 1349), licensed in 1402 by Bishop of Exeter Edmund Stafford. The building is orientated on an east-west axis, thus suited for religious usage. The former entrance was up a steep staircase on the north side.

== Sources ==
- Bury, Richard M.B., History of Colleton Barton, 1993
