= MDP syndrome =

- Other names: Mandibular hypoplasia-deafness-progeroid syndrome
- This condition is inherited in an autosomal dominant manner
- Frequency: 0.0001%

MDP syndrome, also known as mandibular dysplasia with deafness and progeroid features, is an extremely rare metabolic disorder that prevents fatty tissue from being stored underneath the skin. It is only known to affect a very small number of people worldwide (fewer than 12 cases have been diagnosed as of December 2014). Research has suggested that it may be caused by an abnormality of the POLD1 gene on chromosome 19, which causes an enzyme crucial to DNA replication to be defective.

== Presentation ==
- mandibular hypoplasia (a small lower jaw),
- deafness,
- tightening of the skin,
- lipodystrophy (a reduction in fat under the skin),
- low testosterone levels in males,
- contractures of the long tendons of the toes resulting in claw toes and joint stiffness.

== Genetics ==
Initially all people that have been identified with this syndrome have an identical genetic change, an inframe single codon deletion in POLD1 resulting in a loss of serine at position 605. The POLD1 gene is expressed in all cells and the particular change seen in most patients results in loss of DNA polymerase activity but only mildly impairs the proof reading exonuclease activity. In 2014 a second genetic change was reported in an Italian patient, a novel heterozygous mutation in exon 13 (R507C).

Most cases identified to date have been caused by a spontaneous genetic change (so the parents of the individual are unaffected).

== Diagnosis ==
The diagnosis of MDP syndrome is suggested by the clinical features. It can be confirmed by finding a mutation in the POLD1 gene, a service offered by the molecular genetics team at the Royal Devon and Exeter NHS Foundation Trust / Exeter University who originally discovered the genetic cause.

== Management ==
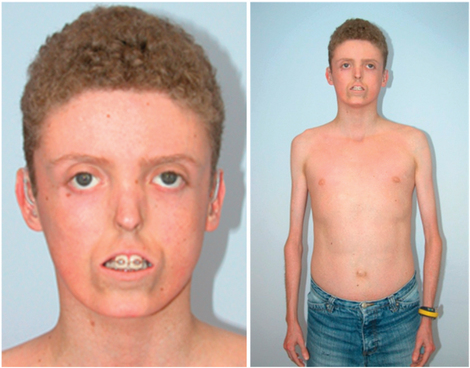
Characteristic appearance of someone with MDP syndrome.

=== General appearance ===
Appearance at birth and during the early years is normal but features become more prominent during later childhood prior to puberty. The main issues appear to be lipodystrophy (see below) and slow growth of cartilage and ligaments. The slow growth of cartilage and ligaments results in a small nose, small mandible (jaw), small ears and tightening of ligaments in the limbs. A small larynx (due to the reduced growth of cartilage) can mean the voice is likely to remain high pitched (even in boys after puberty).

=== Lipodystrophy ===
A major feature is lipodystrophy (a reduction in fat under the skin). The characteristic changes in facial appearance occur from the loss of fat from the cheeks, and around the eyes. Dry eyes and the failure to close eyes during sleep can be a feature due to the loss of fat around the eyes (rather than any excessive prominence of the eyeballs). Limbs appear very thin due to lack of fat storage and also reduced muscle mass. There is a large amount of fat within the abdominal cavity which can be particularly marked in the liver (but not always) and surrounds the other organs. A major result of the lipodystrophy in some people is severe insulin resistance so insulin does not work very well leading to diabetes and high triglyceride levels in the blood. The effect of insulin resistance can be variable and may relate to progression of the lipodystrophy or may reflect variation between individuals.

The skin has a lack of fat and fibrosis. These in turn result in the tight skin on the face and limbs. One direct feature of the lipodystrophy is that the skin is fragile and there is not the protection normally provided by fat under the skin.

==== Management of lipodystrophy ====
As fat cannot be stored under the skin it is important to have a healthy diet without excess fat. Often due to failure to thrive or lack of subcutaneous fat there may have been encouragement to add supplements or fat to the diet however this will not result in any increase in fat under the skin and can easily result in it going into tissues such as the liver or kidney where it is not desired. In people with moderate / severe lipodystrophy a low fat diet would be recommended but in those where the lipodystrophy has not progressed (for example in younger children) a healthy relatively low fat diet may be sufficient. The fat and muscle reduction is not the result of dietary insufficiency and cannot be treated with dietary measures. Apart from diet the other thing that is important is exercise which should be encouraged and will make insulin work more effectively.

In those who have not developed diabetes it is recommended fasting insulin, triglycerides, glucose and HbA1c should be measured annually to monitor insulin resistance and blood glucose.

In those with diabetes it is suggested using metformin in doses of at least 2g/day as it decreases insulin resistance and improves insulin sensitivity, following appropriate clinical consultation.

The thin skin means if there is trauma there should be rapid attention to any wounds to avoid infection and help primary healing as there can be problems with skin ulcers.

=== Low testosterone/hypogonadism in males ===
Some males have had undescended testes but in all cases, whether or not this was corrected, they have hypogonadism (reduced function of the testes) and many may be infertile due to inadequate testicular development. In females normal periods have been observed. Low testosterone will require testosterone replacement. In peri-pubertal males, adequate testosterone replacement is required for its anabolic affects such as growth and also the induction of puberty with high doses. This needs to be coordinated with growth hormone replacement (if given) to avoid early closure of the epitheses (ends of the bones) which would reduce height.

=== Growth ===
Although in the original clinical description short stature was included in the characteristics of MDP syndrome, looking at the data closely it showed that many patients were well within the normal range. If growth is of concern growth hormone therapy could be considered and coordinated with testosterone replacement where appropriate.

=== Deafness ===
Deafness is a feature of MDP syndrome as a result of the nerves not working well and people often have difficulty getting hearing aids because of the small size of their ears. Digital hearing aids can be helpful and audiometry follow up will be needed.

=== Feet/contractures ===
There may be different problems associated with MDP syndrome in the feet. The lack of subcutaneous fat means that there is direct pressure on the skin resulting in callus (hard skin) on the heels and also the weight-bearing parts of the forefoot. This is best managed by trying to find insoles to support the foot but it's difficult to avoid completely. There is no approach that will increase the subcutaneous fat. The second feature is clawed toes as a result of contraction of the long extender tendons. The contractured constrictions can get worse over time. It is worth considering a physiotherapy referral with an aim to establish exercises to try to keep the tendons stretched if possible.

=== Dental ===
The failure of growth of the mandible (lower jaw) can rapidly result in dental overcrowding. In this case it is best to remove teeth early rather than hoping that there will be mandibular (lower jaw) growth. Overcrowding can result in the teeth being severely displaced and again it is best to act early because later correction orthodontically can be extremely difficult.

=== Development ===
Many people with MDP syndrome are high achievers intellectually following careers in law, medicine and computing. A crucial point is that they do not have progeria and there is no evidence of accelerated intellectual decline with age in these patients. Equally life expectancy has not been shown to be reduced. Patients of 65 have been described in the literature and none of the patients are known to have malignancy. Therefore, there are many crucial differences with progeria and the name of progeroid in the title is confusing as this really refers to the lack of fat in the face and taut skin and not any intellectual or other age associated features.

=== General ===
It is helpful to co-ordinate clinical care as much as possible, this may be managed most efficiently by a consultant endocrinologist as the most active management is going to relate to the management of lipodystrophy, insulin resistance, diabetes and testosterone replacement therapy and growth hormone replacement if required. Other local specialists could provide care when this is needed.

== Research ==
The condition was diagnosed by researchers at the University of Exeter Medical School and Molecular Genetics Department at the Royal Devon and Exeter Hospital.

== Society and culture ==
British para-cyclist Tom Staniford is reported to have this condition.
