= Chulmleigh College =

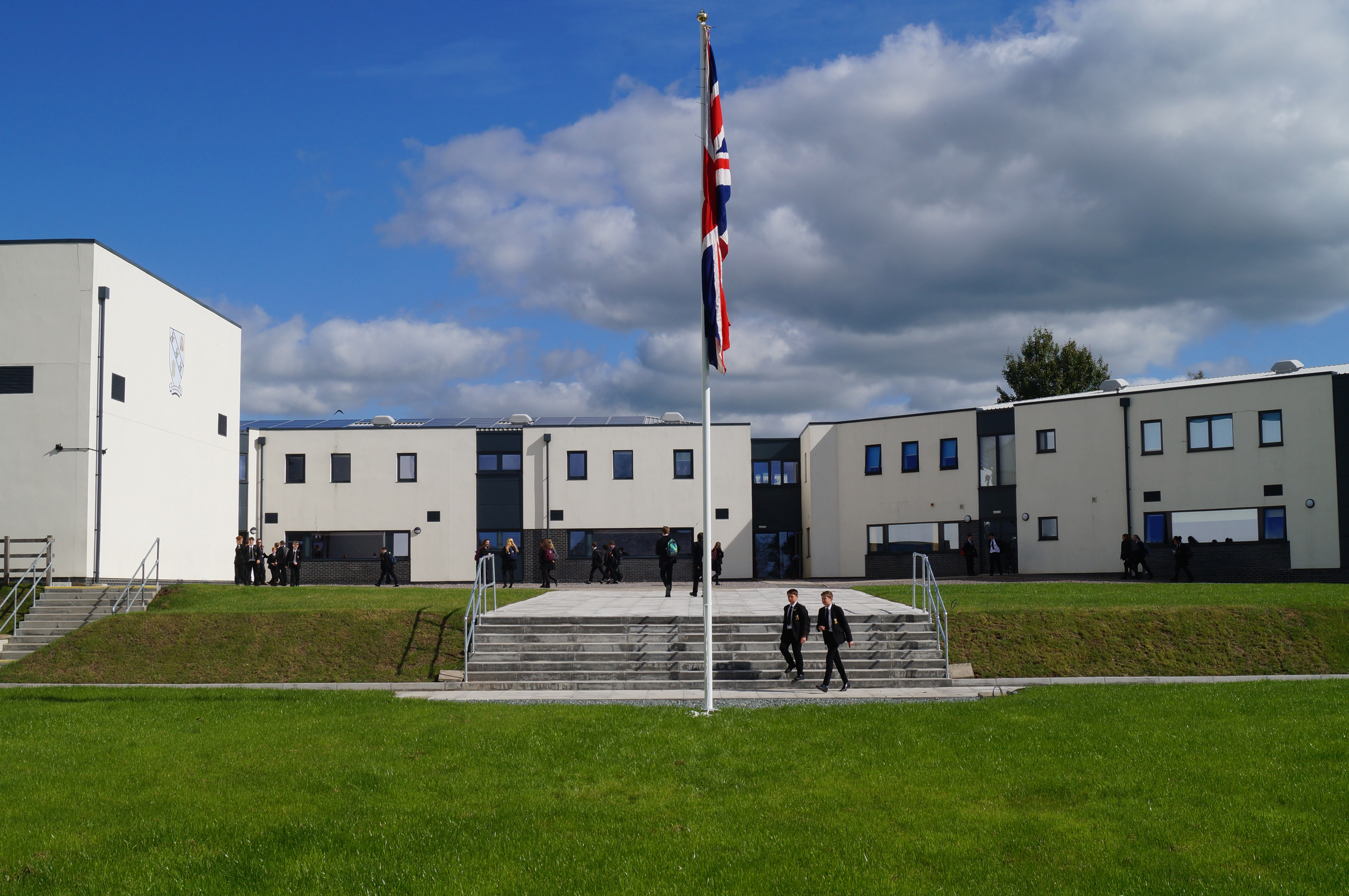
- Chulmleigh College in 2018

Location
- Beacon Road; Chulmleigh, Devon, EX18 7AA; England
- Coordinates: 50.91669°N 3.87025°W

Information
- Type: Academy
- Motto: Nihil Quam Optime (Nothing But Our Best)
- Local authority: Devon County Council
- Trust: Chulmleigh Academy Trust
- Department for Education URN: 137024 Tables
- Ofsted: Reports
- Executive headteacher: Michael Johnson
- Gender: Mixed
- Age range: 11–16
- Enrolment: 565 (2018)
- Capacity: 750
- Houses: Mole Dart Taw Yeo
- Colour
- Website: www.chulmleigh.devon.sch.uk

Chulmleigh College, previously known as Chulmleigh Community College, is an 11–16 co-educational comprehensive secondary school with academy status in Chulmleigh, Devon, England. It was formerly a community school and converted to an academy on 1 August 2011. It continues to coordinate with Devon County Council for admissions.

Between 2014 and 2018 the whole of the school was rebuilt and refurbished during Michael Johnson's tenure as headmaster. There has been much student speculation around the design of the new main building which has the appearance of the letter "J". Some have claimed this to be a deliberate memorial to Johnson himself, with the "J" representing his surname. This, however, is merely speculation.

== Curriculum ==
The school offers GCSEs and BTECs courses as programmes of study. Specialising in an academic curriculum, including French amongst its core subjects at GCSE.

== Reputation ==
The school is rated by Ofsted as "good" and has been rated so since 2010. The school is also ranked as the third best school in Devon with an "above average" rating of 0.43.

== Notable alumni ==
- Tom Staniford, para-cyclist
