= Week, Devon =

Village in Devon, England

Coordinates: 50.937°N 3.805°W

Week
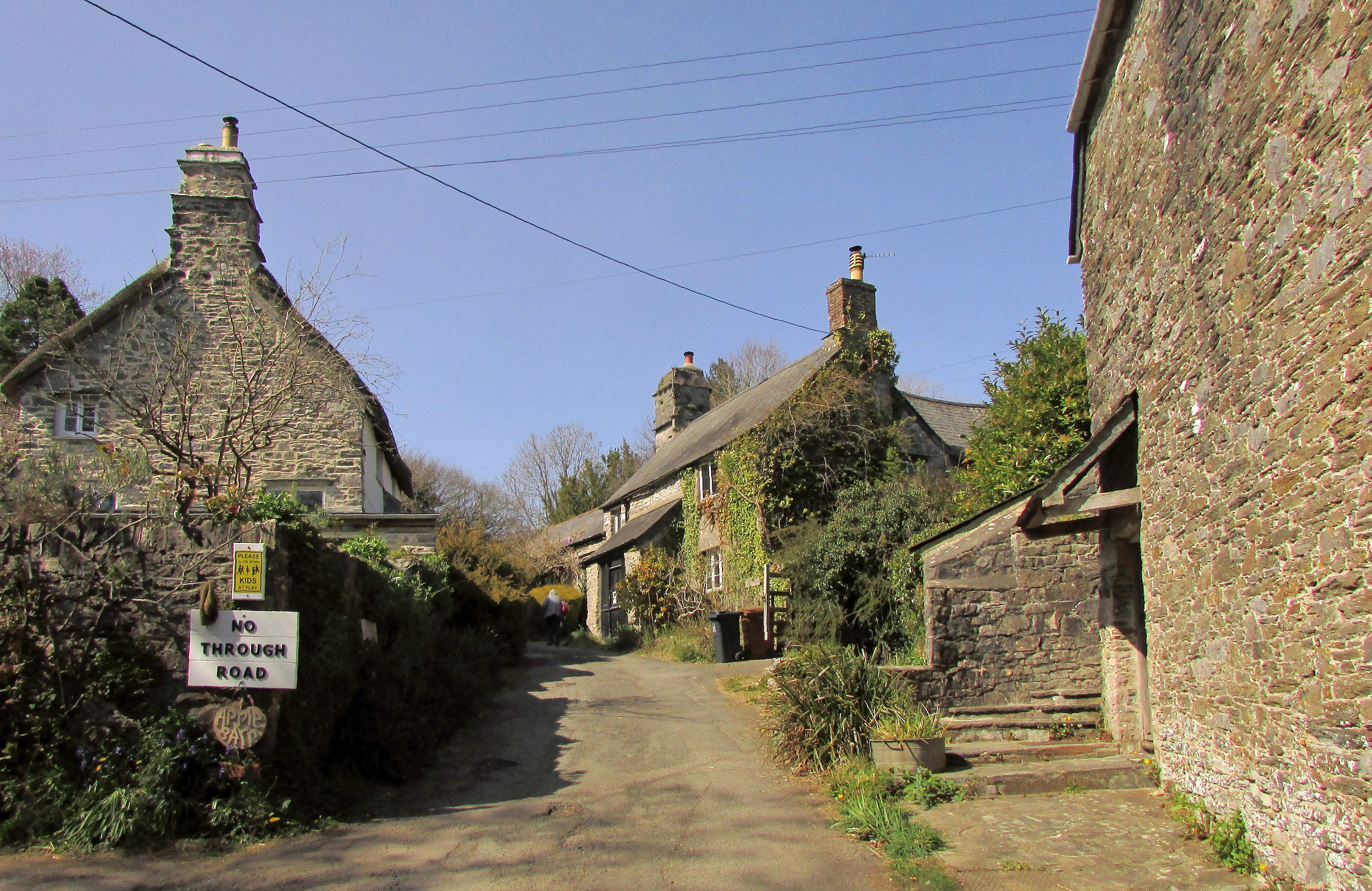
- Cottages at Week

- Location within Devon
- OS grid reference: SS733168
- Civil parish: Chulmleigh
- District: North Devon
- Shire county: Devon
- Region: South West
- Country: England
- Sovereign state: United Kingdom
- Post town: CHULMLEIGH
- Postcode district: EX18
- Dialling code: 01769
- Police: Devon and Cornwall
- Fire: Devon and Somerset
- Ambulance: South Western
- UK Parliament: North Devon

Week is a hamlet in the civil parish of Chulmleigh, in the North Devon district of Devon, England. Its nearest town is Chulmleigh, which lies approximately 3.6 miles (5.8 km) south-west from the village.
