= St Michael and All Angels Church, Bude =

St Michael and All Angels’ Church, Bude
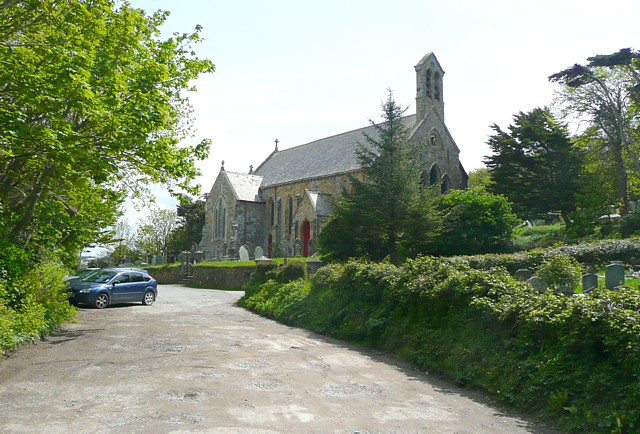
- St Michael and All Angels’ Church, Bude
- St Michael and All Angels’ Church, Bude
- 50°49′35.54″N 4°33′00.22″W
- Location: Bude, Cornwall
- Country: England
- Denomination: Church of England
- Churchmanship: Anglo Catholic

History
- Dedication: St Michael and All Angels

Architecture
- Heritage designation: Grade II listed

Administration
- Province: Province of Canterbury
- Diocese: Diocese of Truro
- Archdeaconry: Bodmin
- Deanery: Stratton
- Parish: Bude Haven

St Michael and All Angels Church is a Grade II listed church in Bude, Cornwall.

== History ==
It was originally built in 1834 by George Wightwick for Sir Thomas Dyke Acland, 10th Baronet as a Chapel of Ease to Stratton Parish Church. The church was expanded in 1878 by Edward Ashworth for Sir Thomas Dyke Acland, 11th Baronet. It became a listed building on 9 September 1985.

== Organ ==
The organ dates from 1923 and was built by G. Jackson. A specification of the organ can be found on the National Pipe Organ Register.
