= Tom Staniford =

English racing cyclist (born 1989)

Personal information
- Full name: Tom Staniford
- Born: 1 July 1989 (age 37) Akrotiri, Cyprus
- Height: 6 ft 3 in (191 cm)
- Weight: 65 kg (143 lb)

Cycling career
- Sport: Cycling
- Current team: CycleFit
- Disciplines: Road and Track
- Role: Rider

Major wins
- National Para-cycling Circuit Race Champion (2011)

Tom Staniford (born 1 July 1989) is an English para-cyclist from Exeter. He was the 2011 National Para-Cycling Circuit Race Champion.

He is provisionally classified by the UCI as a C3 para-cyclist due to connective tissue disorders affecting his feet and hands, almost-total fixation of his ankles, poor flexibility in all his limbs, low testosterone, diabetes type 2, moderate hearing loss in both ears, and lipodystrophy, which affects his metabolism and body fat amongst other things. His condition was diagnosed in 2013 as MDP syndrome, an extremely rare genetic condition.

== Early life ==
Born in the Princess Mary Hospital, Akrotiri, Cyprus, Staniford moved around a lot as a young child, living in; Hamburg (Germany), Greenwich (England), Cyprus, Kuwait, Wales, and Blandford Forum, (Dorset).

== Education ==
Staniford attended Chulmleigh Community College, North Devon, between 2006 and 2007 where he achieved 14 GCSEs. He then went on to study the International Baccalaureate programme at Exeter College.

In June 2012 Staniford graduated from the University of Rennes 1 following completion of his Master 1 (mention Droit Européen) degree. One month later he was also awarded Class 2:1 Honours for his LLB European (Maitrise) degree at the University of Exeter. where he had been the recipient of both a sports scholarship and a Vice-Chancellor's Excellence Scholarship.

== Cycling ==
=== 2005–2006 ===
Staniford bought his first road bike in 2005 and soon became a keen cyclist. In June 2006, he had a head-on collision with a car whilst out training and was left with life-threatening injuries including fractured eye sockets, brain bleeds, cranial trauma, broken teeth, broken collarbone, 4 broken ribs, a collapsed lung and a broken toe. His knees were also severely lacerated due to going through the car windscreen. His heart stopped twice in the air ambulance en route to the Royal Devon and Exeter Hospital, where he was treated for his injuries.

This did not deter Staniford and he used cycling as a form of rehabilitation to help him recover from his injuries. In recognition of Devon Air Ambulance's crucial role in keeping him alive and transporting him to hospital in rapid time, he set out to train for, organise, and compete a 60-mile charity ride that raised £1,000 for the Devon Air Ambulance Trust (DAAT). A further £5,000 was given to the DAAT by Eamonn Holmes and The People newspaper, in recognition of Staniford's courage and the role the DAAT play in the Southwest.

=== 2007–2009 ===
Staniford then joined Bikin Motion CC and was preparing for the Junior Tour of Wales but broke his wrist in a crash whilst racing at Ilton (raf merryfield race course). Unable to compete, Staniford accompanied Bikin Motion nonetheless, and performed soigneur duties for his team. After healing, Staniford continued to ride with Bikin Motion and became increasingly serious about his sport. He was scheduled to represent Great Britain in the 2009 Taipei Deaflympics but unfortunately a crash whilst out training resulted in a broken wrist and head injuries which meant he was unable to attend.

At the end of the 2009 season Staniford was invited to race for Rapha Condor CC.

=== 2010 ===
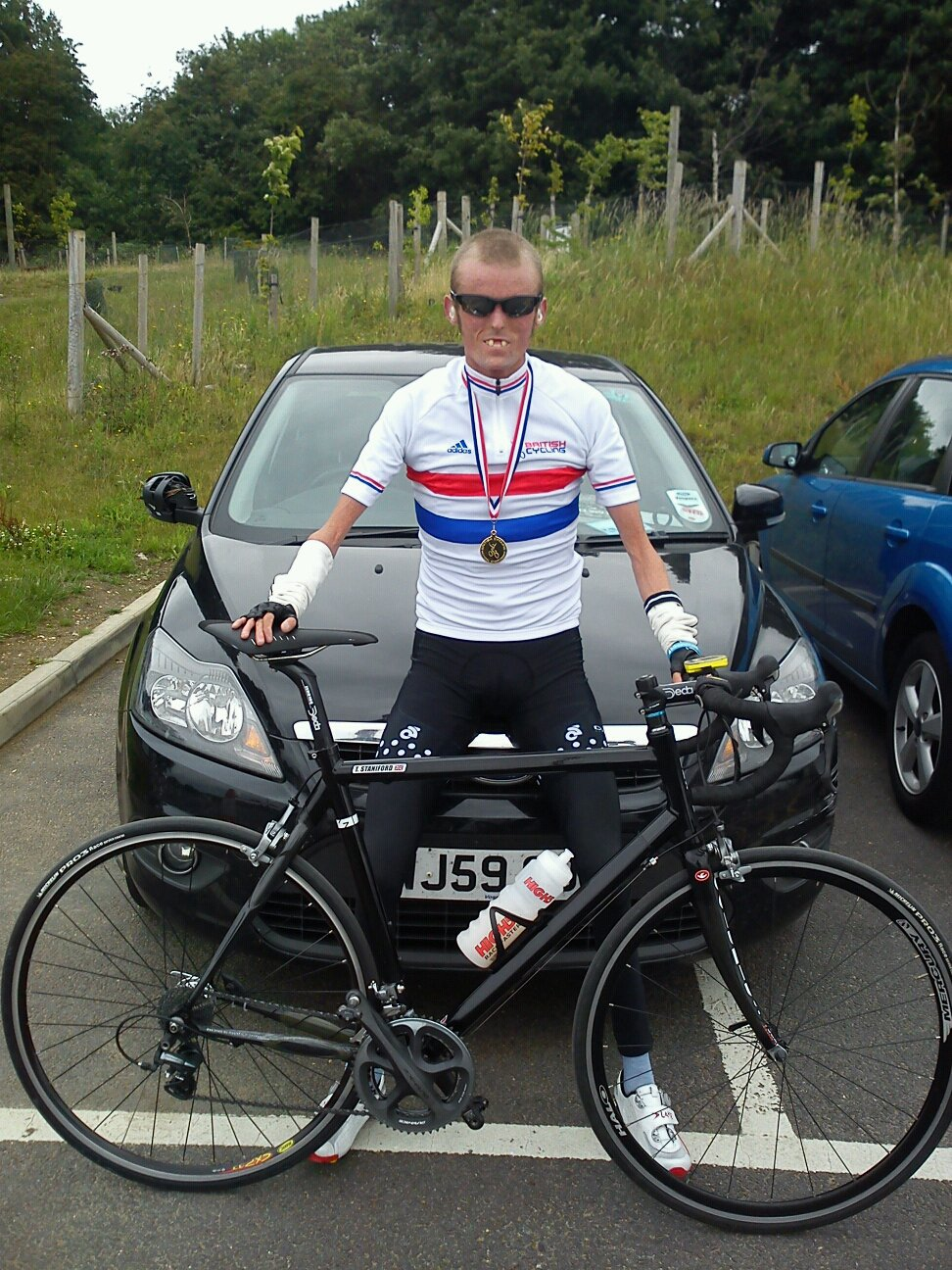
Tom Staniford 2011 National Para-Cycling Circuit Race Champion.

Missing out on the Deaflympics did not discourage Staniford, who soon began investigating para-cycling and managed to attend a second round of British Cycling(BC) para-cycling talent camps and was invited onto the BC Para-cycling Talent Team which develops talented riders and prepares them for transition into higher levels of competition representing Great Britain.

Staniford was provisionally put in the C4 class by the UCI; a harsh decision influenced by the scarcity of knowledge about MDP syndrome and its effects, at that time (it wasn't even a recognized condition).

As part of the BC Para Talent Team Staniford raced in the 2010 UCI Paracycling World Cup Series in Bilbao (Spain) and the 2010 URT 24 Handisport UCI Para-Cycling World Cup Series in Bayonne (France).

Later in the year Staniford also competed in the 2010 Kent International Elite C4-5 Road Race + Elite Time Trial and the 2010 British Cycling National Para-Cycling Track Championships Elite Pursuit.

After the National Track Championships Staniford was provisionally re-classified as a C3 rider by the UCI.

=== 2011 ===
Staniford raced domestically in 2011 for British cycling analysts and custom frame builders CycleFit. On 25 June 2011 he won the National Para-Cycling Circuit Race Championship at Redbridge Cycling Centre to become 2011 National Champion. He remains the youngest ever solo rider to have won the senior title, at 21.

=== 2012 ===
Staniford accomplished very little racing this season due to working hard in France to complete his Maitrise-en-Droit master's degree in European Law.

=== 2013 ===
Staniford returned to the UK and relocated to London for employment. Once settled, he began the 2013 season racing for Trek Bikes UK. He led the National TT Series and the National Circuit Race Series, won 50% of the races he entered, and (with the exception of one race) never finished off the podium. Around this time a global genetic breakthrough also prompted the diagnosis of his condition as MDP syndrome, and he was proud to do all he could to raise awareness of this research and genetic conditions in general. He has since appeared on BBC, Channel 4, and ITV channels in the UK, and over 40 different international newspapers and magazines.

=== 2014 ===
A quiet racing season for Staniford as medical and employment relocation issues disrupted his training and health. He was hoping to compete at the British National TT Championships on 11 October 2014.

=== Clubs and sponsors ===
2013–present Trek SRM ProVision
2012–2013 Trek UK
2010–2012 CycleFit
2009–2010 Rapha Condor CC
2007–2009 Bikin Motion CC

=== Major achievements ===
- 2010 UCI Para-Cycling World Cup Series, Bilbao

Elite Time Trial 11km – 20th
Elite Road Race 52 km – 18th

- 2010 British Track Championships

PB in kilo (1:18)
PB 3k pursuit (4:05)

- 2010 National Disability Circuit Race Series
- 2010 UCI Para-Cycling World Cup Series, Bayonne

Elite Road Race – 12th
Elite Time Trial – 9th

- 2010 Kent International

Elite C4-5 Road Race, 42km – 9th (2nd in C4 class)
Elite Time Trial – 4th

- 2010 British Cycling National Para-Cycling Track Championships

Elite Pursuit C4 – 8th (3rd in C4 class)

- 2011 British National Para-cycling Circuit Race Championship

1st (C3 class)

== Palmarès ==
2011 – 1st National Para-cycling Circuit Race Champion
