= Chulmleigh =

Market town and civil parish in Devon, England

Coordinates: 50°54′46″N 3°52′09″W

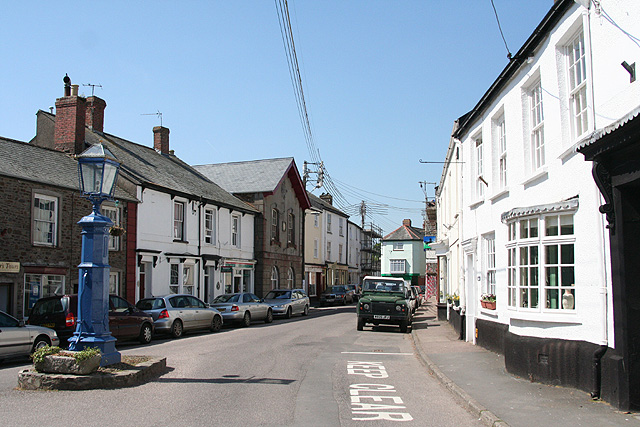
- Main Street in Chulmleigh

- Location within Devon
- Population: 1,017 (2011)
- OS grid reference: SS6814
- Civil parish: Chulmleigh
- District: North Devon
- Shire county: Devon
- Region: South West
- Country: England
- Sovereign state: United Kingdom
- Post town: CHULMLEIGH
- Postcode district: EX18
- Dialling code: 01769
- Police: Devon and Cornwall
- Fire: Devon and Somerset
- Ambulance: South Western
- UK Parliament: North Devon
- Website: Parish Council

Chulmleigh (/ˈtʃʌmli/ CHUM-lee) is a small Saxon hilltop market town (Note: Since at least 1292, Chulmleigh has held the right to hold a regular market, making it a market town. However, the parish council has not elected to give itself the status of a town as it could do under s.245(6) of the Local Government Act 1972, so it does not have a town council and cannot have a town mayor.) and civil parish in North Devon, in the heart of the English county of Devon. It lies 20 miles (32 km) north west of Exeter, just north of the Mid Devon boundary, linked by the A377 and B3096 roads.

== History ==
The first documentary reference to the place is in the Domesday Book of 1086 where it is recorded as Calmonlevge. The name derives from the Old English personal name Ceolmund and the common place-name element leah which has various meanings including "woodland", "a woodland clearing" and "meadow". At the time of Domesday the land was held by Baldwin the Sheriff from whom it passed to the Courtenay family, who made the settlement a borough in the mid-thirteenth century. Situated on the main road between Exeter and Barnstaple, Chulmleigh thrived during the 17th and 18th centuries; it was a centre of wool production, had a good market and three cattle fairs. The wool trade had ceased by the early 19th century, but the road traffic kept the town prosperous until a new turnpike road bypassed the town in about 1830; the opening in 1854 of the North Devon Railway also contributed to its decline.

Colleton is a historic estate within the parish.

== Description ==
The parish includes the hamlets of Cheldon, Colleton and Week. It is surrounded, clockwise from the north, by the parishes of King's Nympton, Romansleigh, Meshaw, East Worlington, Chawleigh, Wembworthy (a short border only), Ashreigney, Burrington, and Chittlehamholt. In 2001 the population of the parish was 1,308, decreasing to 1,017 at the 2011 census. An electoral ward with the same name also exists whose total population at the same census was 2,081.

Because of its former prosperity the town has several fine old buildings, many constructed of cob and thatch. The parish church dedicated to St Mary Magdalene was originally a collegiate church and was founded early. It was completely rebuilt in the 15th century and partially restored in 1881.

Chulmleigh has a retained fire station which is part of Devon and Somerset Fire and Rescue Service. The secondary school is Chulmleigh College. The town's pub is the Old Court House on South Molton Street.

Local businesses and organisations include a health centre, a dentist, a convenience store, newsagent and post office, Chulmleigh Cricket Club, Chulmleigh Tennis Club, Winston Pincombe garage, a deli, a florist, a hair and beauty salon, a bakery, a craft shop, a charity shop, a monthly rural cinema, and Chulmleigh Golf Course.

== Transport ==
Chumleigh is close to the Tarka Line, the railway from Exeter to Barnstaple. Kings Nympton railway station is within the parish although it is around 2 miles (3.2 km) from the town. Eggesford station is closer to the town.

== Twin towns – sister cities ==
Fontenay-le-Marmion is twinned with:

- Fontenay-le-Marmion, France, since 1979.
