= Heavitree stone =

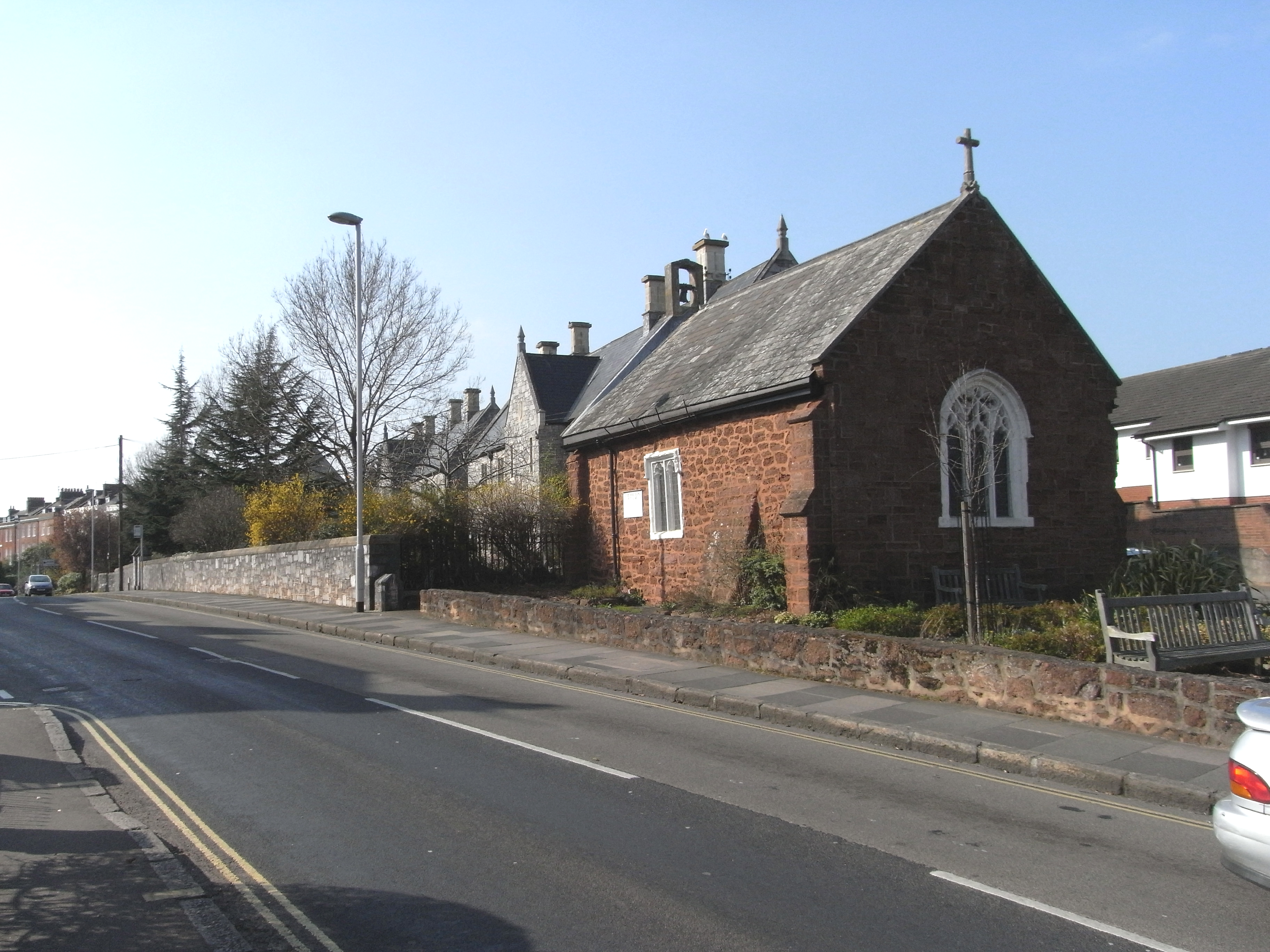
Livery Dole Chapel in Heavitree, built of Heavitree stone

Heavitree stone is a type of breccia stone, red in colour, of very coarse texture and prone to weathering, which occurs naturally in the parish of Heavitree near the City of Exeter in Devon, England. It was quarried in the area from about 1350 to the 19th century, and was used to construct many of Exeter's older buildings, including Exeter Castle, the old city walls, and many of the almshouses and parish churches. Many ancient buildings in Exeter made of Heavitree stone were destroyed by enemy bombing during World War II. It was first referred to by Sir Henry De La Beche in 1839, as the "Conglomerates of Heavitree".

== Quarries ==
The site of the historic quarry is represented today by "Quarry Lane" in Heavitree, where survive two quarry faces, and another quarry existed in nearby Wonford. A quarry is first recorded in 1390.

== Description ==
The stone comprises angular fragments and grains, up to 40mm in diameter, of sandstone, chert, minerals, granite and volcanic rocks, all embedded in a matrix of finer sands and clay. As the stone was formed from sediment laid down by flash flooding in semi-arid conditions, the stone fragments are not rounded by the wearing of water, as are sedimentary deposits laid down in the sea. It dates to the Triassic period, about 280 million years ago.
