= Walrond =

Walrond is a surname. Notable people with the surname include:

- Edmund Walrond (1655–1708), English Member of Parliament
- Emma Maria Walrond (1859–1943), New Zealand painter
- Eric D. Walrond (1898–1966), Harlem Renaissance writer
- Humphrey Walrond (c. 1600 – c. 1670), deputy governor of Barbados
- Sir John Walrond (1818-1889), British politician
- Les Walrond (b. 1976), American baseball player
- Violet Walrond (1905–1996), New Zealand Olympic swimmer
- William Walrond, 1st Baron Waleran (1849–1925), British peer
- William Walrond (politician) (1876–1915), Member of Parliament; son of the above
