= Tiverton by-election =

Tiverton by-election may refer to:

- 1872 Tiverton by-election, following the resignation of George Denman
- 1915 Tiverton by-election, following the death of William Walrond
- 1923 Tiverton by-election, following the death of Herbert Sparkes
- 1960 Tiverton by-election, following the elevation to the Lords of Derick Heathcoat-Amory
- 2022 Tiverton and Honiton by-election, following the resignation of Neil Parish
