= William Walrond =

William Walrond may refer to:

- William Walrond, 1st Baron Waleran (1849–1925), British MP for Tiverton
- William Walrond (politician) (1876–1915), British MP for Tiverton, son of the above
