= Charles Carew =

British politician

Member of Parliament for Tiverton
- In office 1915-1922

Personal details
- Born: 7 June 1853
- Died: 23 March 1939 (aged 85)
- Party: Conservative
- Spouse: Muriel Heathcoat-Amory (m. 1891–1939)
- Children: 5
- Relatives: Carew baronets
- Education: St John's College, Cambridge

Charles Robert Sydenham Carew JP (7 June 1853 – 23 March 1939) was a British Conservative politician.

== Biography ==
Carew was the son of Reverend Robert Baker Carew, Rector of Bickleigh, Devon, grandson of Sir Thomas Carew, 6th Baronet (see Carew baronets). His mother was Augusta Elizabeth, daughter of Thomas Daniel. He was educated at St John's College, Cambridge. Carew served as a justice of the peace for Devon and sat as Conservative member of parliament for Tiverton between 1915 and 1922. He lived at Colliepriest House, Devon.

Carew married Muriel Mary, daughter of Sir John Heathcoat-Amory, 1st Baronet, in 1891. They had two sons and three daughters. She died on 4 March 1939, aged 71. Carew survived her by less than three weeks and died on 23 March 1939, aged 85.

== Notes ==
Parliament of the United Kingdom
Preceded by Hon. William Walrond	Member of Parliament for Tiverton; 1915 – 1922	Succeeded by Herbert Sparkes
