= Charles Hepburn-Stuart-Forbes-Trefusis =

Charles Hepburn-Stuart-Forbes-Trefusis may refer to:

- Charles Hepburn-Stuart-Forbes-Trefusis, 20th Baron Clinton (1834–1904), British politician
- Charles Hepburn-Stuart-Forbes-Trefusis, 21st Baron Clinton (1863–1957), British peer
