= Baron Waleran =

Extinct barony in the Peerage of the United Kingdom

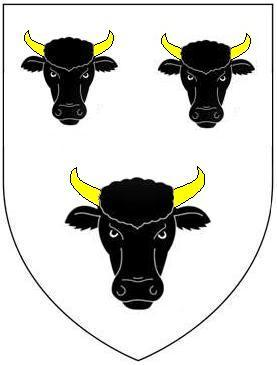
Arms of Walrond of Bradfield, Devon: Argent, three bull's heads cabossed sable armed or; Crest: A heraldic tiger sable pellete

Baron Waleran, of Uffculme in the County of Devon, was a title in the Peerage of the United Kingdom. It was created on 23 December 1905 for the Conservative politician Sir William Walrond, 2nd Baronet, of Bradfield House, Uffculme. The name of the barony, with its spelling being a variant of the family name, appears to have been chosen to suggest a possible ancestry from Waleran the Huntsman, feudal baron of West Dean, Wiltshire, at the time of the Domesday Book of 1086, which was held by the Waleran family until the death of Walter Walerand in 1200/1 leaving three daughters his co-heiresses. His elevation to the peerage did not cause a by-election due to the upcoming general election, where his son, William, succeeded him as the Member of Parliament for Tiverton. The Walrond Baronetcy, of Bradfield and of Newcourt, both in the County of Devon, was created in the Baronetage of the United Kingdom on 24 February 1876 for the first Baron's father, John Walrond, who also represented Tiverton in Parliament. The title was named after the family's manor of Bradfield, Uffculme, Devon, held by them since the 13th century. The baronetcy and barony became extinct on the death of the first Baron's grandson, the second Baron, on 4 April 1966.

== Walrond baronets, of Bradfield (1876) ==
- Sir John Walrond Walrond, 1st Baronet (1818–1889)
- Sir William Hood Walrond, 2nd Baronet (1849–1925) (created Baron Waleran in 1905)

== Barons Waleran (1905) ==
- William Hood Walrond, 1st Baron Waleran (1849–1925)
  - Hon. William Lionel Charles Walrond (1876–1915)
- William George Hood Walrond, 2nd Baron Waleran (1905–1966)

Baronetage of the United Kingdom
Preceded by Hardy baronets	Walrond baronets of Bradfield House; 24 February 1876	Succeeded by Codrington baronets
