= Sir John Walrond, 1st Baronet =

British Conservative Party politician

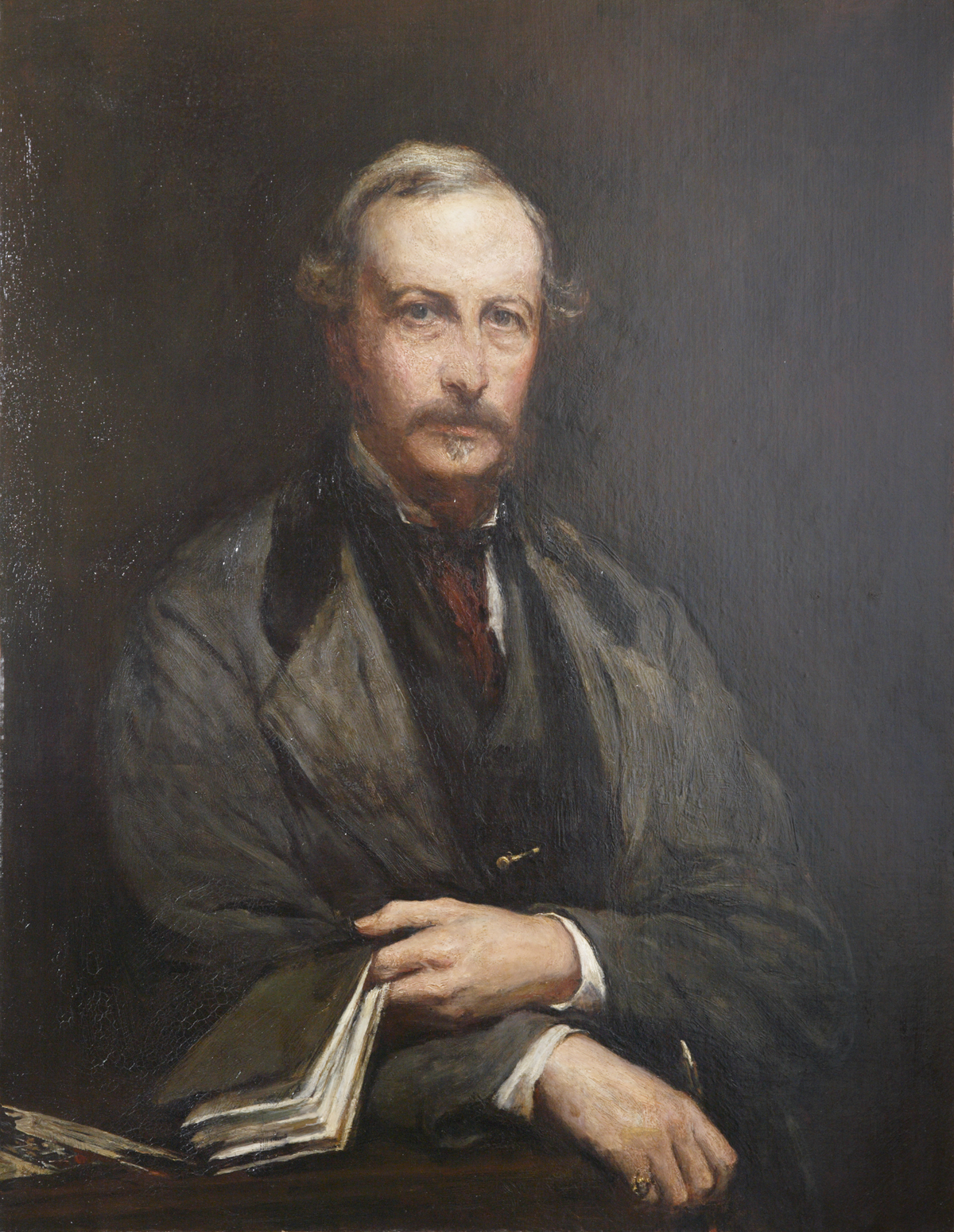
Sir John Walrond Walrond, 1st Baronet, portrait by George Frederic Watts post 1874

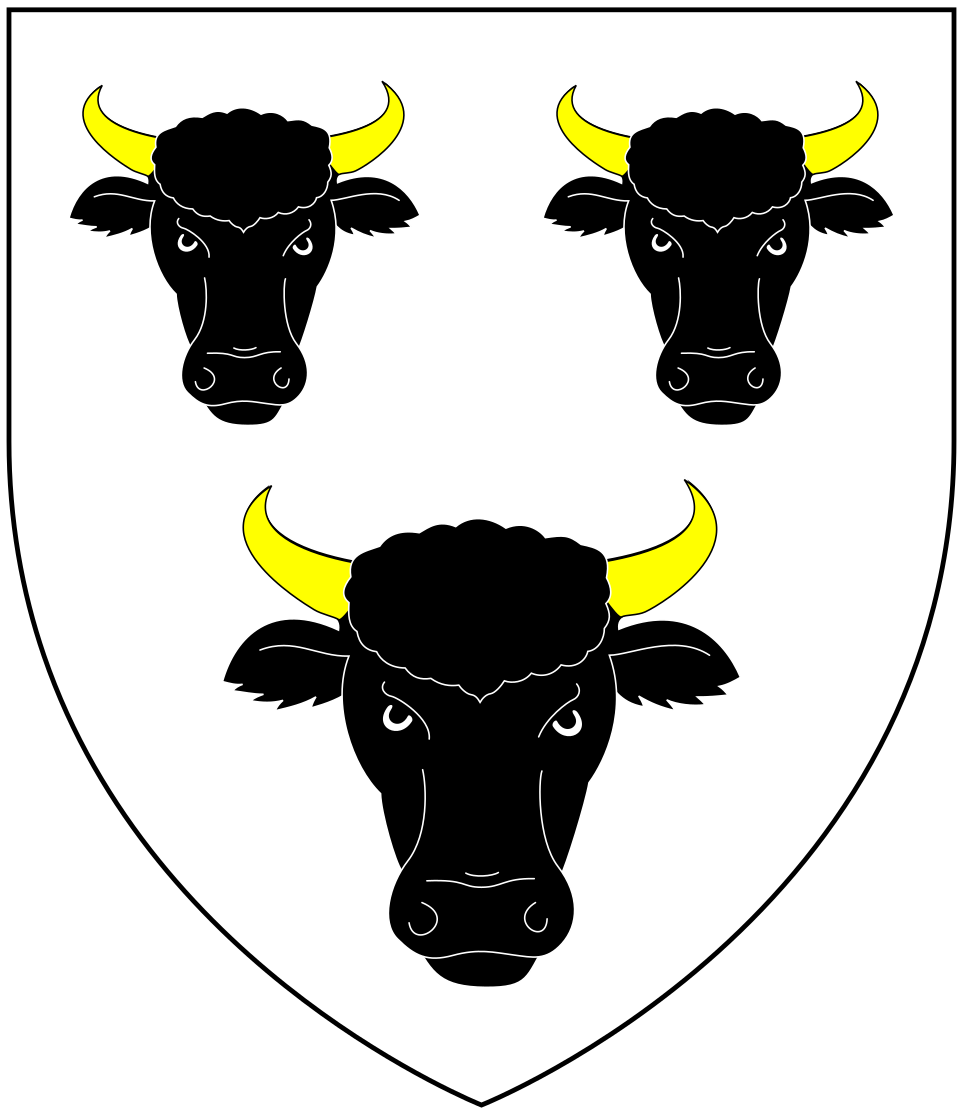
Arms of Walrond: Argent, three bull's heads cabossed sable armed or. Adopted by the 1st Baronet together with the surname Walrond

Sir John Walrond Walrond, 1st Baronet (1 March 1818 – 23 April 1889), of Bradfield House, Uffculme in Devon (known as John Walrond Dickinson until 22 April 1845), was a British Conservative Party politician.

== Origins ==
He was born on 1 March 1818 as "John Walrond Dickinson", the son and heir of Benjamin Bowden Dickinson (1793–1851), JP, DL, of Tiverton in Devon, Sheriff of Devon in 1824, the son of John Dickinson (died 1813) (by his wife Harriet Bowden), of Knightshayes Court, near Tiverton, a wealthy merchant in that town.

John's mother was Frances Walrond, eldest daughter and eventual sole heiress of William Henry Walrond (born 1762) of Bradfield (near Tiverton) in Devon, by his wife Mary Alford of Sandford in Devon. The Walronds were an ancient gentry family seated at Bradfield since the reign of King Henry III (1216-1272), inherited by marriage to the heiress of the "de Bradfield" family. At least six years after his marriage and following his wife's inheritance, by royal licence dated 21 April 1845 Benjamin changed his surname to Walrond.

== Career ==
In 1865 he was elected as the Member of Parliament for Tiverton, Devon, a major cloth manufacturing town near Bradfield where his family had much influence, but he stood down at the next election in 1868. He stood for the seat a number of times over the next 12 years – in 1872, 1874 and 1880 – but without success. He was selected Sheriff of Devon for 1874–75. He was created 1st Baronet "of Bradfield, Devon" on 24 February 1876.

== Marriage and issue ==
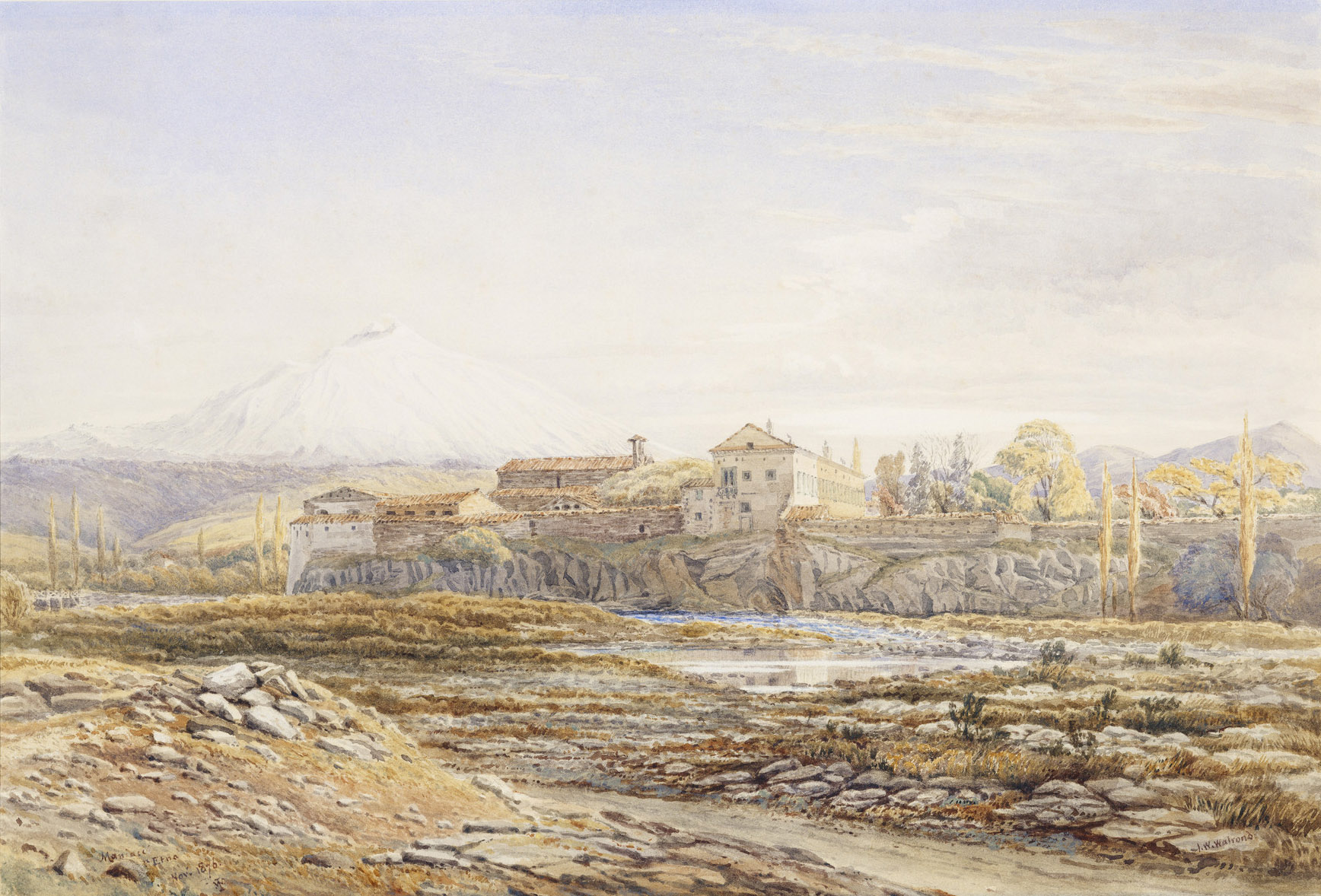
Painting made by the 1st Baronet in 1876 of the Castello di Maniace near Bronte in Sicily, caput of his mother-in-law's vast Sicilian dukedom, painted 3 years after her death. Royal Collection

On 20 May 1845 Walrond married Frances Caroline Hood, a daughter of Samuel Hood, 2nd Baron Bridport (1788-1868), of Cricket St Thomas in Somerset, by his wife Charlotte Nelson, suo jure 3rd Duchess of Bronté (1787-1873), niece and eventual heiress of the great Admiral Horatio Nelson, 1st Viscount Nelson, 1st Duke of Bronte (1758-1805), by whom he had five children, two sons and three daughters as follows:

- William Hood Walrond, 1st Baron Waleran, 2nd Baronet (1849-1925), eldest son and heir, created Baron Waleran in 1905;
- Arthur Melville Walrond (1861-1946);
- Katherine Mary Walrond (1846-1934), wife of Charles Arthur Williams Troyte (1842–1896), builder of Huntsham Court in Devon;
- Margaret Walrond (1850-1930), wife of Charles Hepburn-Stuart-Forbes-Trefusis, 20th Baron Clinton of Heanton Satchville, Huish in Devon;
- Gertrude Walrond (1853-1920), wife of Sir Thomas Dyke Acland, 12th Baronet, of Holnicote in Devon, who died without issue.
- Dame Edith Benyon (1857-1919), hospital commandant

== Illegitimate daughter and Death ==
- (Mary Caroline, illegitimate, by unknown mother.)

Funeral. The funeral of Sir John Walrond, who died at Cannes, took place 30 May 1889 at Bradfield near Tiverton, the family seat. Chief mourners were The Hon. Lady Walrond, Col. Sir W H Walrond (who succeeded to the Title), Mr & Mrs Arthur Walrond, Col. & Mrs Troyte, Lord & Lady Clinton, Major & Mrs Holbech, Mr & Mrs Herbert Fellowes, Mrs Edward Drew, Lady Hotham, Rev. John Dickinson, and Mr Hall M.P. The interment took place at the burying ground attached to the chapel, which was endowed by the decease. (Source: The Queen, The Lady's newspaper. 4 May 1889).

Parliament of the United Kingdom
Preceded by George Denman; Henry John Temple	Member of Parliament for Tiverton; 1865–1868; With: George Denman (1866–1868); Henry John Temple (1865–1866)	Succeeded by George Denman; John Heathcoat-Amory
Baronetage of the United Kingdom
New creation	Baronet (of Bradfield); 1876–1889	Succeeded by William Walrond
