= Charles Hepburn-Stuart-Forbes-Trefusis, 20th Baron Clinton =

British Conservative politician

The Right Honourable The Lord Clinton
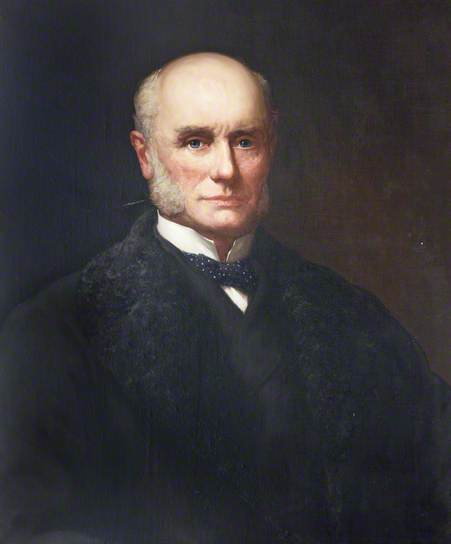
- Portrait by unknown artist, collection of Devon County Council, Larkbeare House, Exeter

Under-Secretary of State for India
- In office 31 July 1867 – 25 February 1868
- Monarch: Victoria
- Prime Minister: The Earl of Derby; Benjamin Disraeli
- Preceded by: Sir James Ferguson, Bt
- Succeeded by: M. E. Grant Duff

Personal details
- Born: Charles Henry Rolle Trefusis; 2 March 1834 Rome, Papal States
- Died: 29 March 1904 (aged 70) Cairo, Egypt
- Party: Conservative
- Spouses: Harriet Hepburn-Forbes (m. 1858; died 1869) Margaret Walrond (m. 1875)
- Education: Christ Church, Oxford

Arms of the 20th Baron Clinton

Charles Henry Rolle Hepburn-Stuart-Forbes-Trefusis, 20th Baron Clinton (2 March 1834 – 29 March 1904), styled The Honourable Charles Trefusis between 1832 and 1866, was a British Conservative politician. He served as Under-Secretary of State for India from 1867 to 1868.

== Early life and education ==
Clinton was born in Rome in 1834, the eldest son of the eight children of Charles Trefusis, 19th Baron Clinton, and Lady Elizabeth Georgiana Kerr, daughter of William Kerr, 6th Marquess of Lothian. His father was at the time suffering financial difficulties as the estates inherited from his own father were heavily mortgaged, partly to pay jointures and allowances to other family members. His younger brother was Hon. Mark Rolle (1835–1907) (born Mark George Kerr Trefusis), of Stevenstone, St Giles in the Wood, Devon, High Sheriff of Devon in 1864, a DL of Devon and High Steward of Barnstaple, who due to an inheritance at the age of six from his uncle by marriage, John Rolle, 1st Baron Rolle (1750–1842), acquired a life interest in the largest private estate in Devon, amounting to about 55,000 acres and producing a high annual income. As Mark Rolle died without male progeny, his brother Lord Clinton became (in his issue) his heir, under the terms of the entail created by Lord Rolle. The bulk of his father's Devon estates and the title Baron Clinton had been inherited by marriage from the wealthy Rolle family of Heanton Satchville, Petrockstowe, a junior branch of the even wealthier Rolles of Stevenstone. When the Rolle mansion of Heanton Satchville burnt down, the then Lord Clinton purchased an estate on the opposite side of the valley in the small parish of Huish, and renamed the existing mansion there Heanton Satchville.

Clinton was educated at Eton College. In 1854, he graduated with first-class honours in law and modern history from Christ Church, Oxford.

== Political career ==
Clinton was elected to the House of Commons for Devon North in 1857, a seat he held until he succeeded his father in the peerage in 1866 and entered the House of Lords.

In July 1867, he was appointed Under-Secretary of State for India in the Conservative administration of the Earl of Derby. He retained this office also when Benjamin Disraeli became Prime Minister in February 1868. The government fell in December of the same year. Clinton never held political office again but served as a Charity Commissioner from 1874 to 1880. Apart from his political career he was also Lord Lieutenant of Devon between 1887 and 1904. He had served as chairman of the Devon Quarter Sessions, the local government body for Devon, and served as the first Chairman of its replacement, the newly formed Devon County Council from 1889 to 1901.

== Landholdings and wealth ==
In later life, Lord Clinton owned estates in England of 18,135 acres, of which 14,431 were in Devon, worth £23,246 per annum, and in Scotland 16,655 acres worth £14,230 per annum. This contrasted with his former meagre annual allowance received from his father at the time of his first marriage of £700 per annum.

== Marriage and issue ==
Lord Clinton married twice. First, in 1858 at Fasque, near Fettercairn in Scotland, he wed his first cousin Harriet Williamina Hepburn-Forbes (d. 1869), daughter and heiress of Sir John Stuart Hepburn-Forbes, 8th Baronet (d.1867), of Fettercairn and Pitsligo, Scotland. The mothers of each were daughters of William Kerr, Marquess of Lothian, and their families initially opposed the match on the grounds of consanguinity. In 1867, in accordance with his father-in-law's will, he assumed by royal licence the additional surnames and arms of Hepburn-Stuart-Forbes. By Harriet he had five children:

- Charles Hepburn-Stuart-Forbes-Trefusis, 21st Baron Clinton (18 January 1863 – 5 July 1957)
- Lieutenant-Colonel Hon. Henry Walter Hepburn-Stuart-Forbes-Trefusis (8 December 1864 – 2 June 1948)
- Hon. Ada Harriet Hepburn-Stuart-Forbes-Trefusis (died unmarried 14 October 1945)
- Hon. Mary Elizabeth Hepburn-Stuart-Forbes-Trefusis (died unmarried 7 June 1954)
- Hon. Margaret Adela Hepburn-Stuart-Forbes-Trefusis, married Rt Rev Leonard Jauncey White-Thomson, Bishop of Ely (died 20 March 1939). They were the parents of Ian White-Thomson.

Harriet died in 1869, and in 1875 Lord Clinton remarried, to Margaret Walrond (d.1930), daughter of Sir John Walrond, 1st Baronet, of Bradfield House, Uffculme, Devon. As Lady Clinton, Margaret organised the 'Ladies of Devonshire' wedding gift of pearl earrings to Mary of Teck, the future Queen Mary. By Margaret he had seven further children:

- Brigadier-General Hon. John Frederick Hepburn-Stuart-Forbes-Trefusis, DSO (14 January 1878 – died of wounds 24 October 1915)
- Lieutenant-Colonel Hon. Walter Alexander Hepburn-Stuart-Forbes-Trefusis (1 July 1879 – 11 July 1926)
- Hon. Schomberg Charles Hepburn-Stuart-Forbes-Trefusis (22 March 1882 – 11 October 1974)
- Hon. Robert Henry Hepburn-Stuart-Forbes-Trefusis (1 July 1888 – 1 July 1958)
- Hon. Edith Hepburn-Stuart-Forbes-Trefusis (12 February 1876 – 13 April 1934)
- Hon. Evelyn Mary Hepburn-Stuart-Forbes-Trefusis (3 July 1883 – 5 January 1963), married Colonel Harry Stuart Ravenhill
- Hon. Harriet Margaret Hepburn-Stuart-Forbes-Trefusis (b 20 March 1891 – 2 February 1975), married Lieutenant-Colonel Eustace Maurice Widdrington-Bell

== Death ==
Lord Clinton died of heart failure in Cairo in March 1904, aged 70, where he had gone for health reasons, and was buried at St Andrew's Church, South Huish, which he had rebuilt in memory of his first wife Harriet. He was succeeded in the barony by his eldest son from his first marriage, Charles Hepburn-Stuart-Forbes-Trefusis, 21st Baron Clinton.

Parliament of the United Kingdom
Preceded by Sir Thomas Dyke Acland, Bt; Lewis William Buck	Member of Parliament for North Devon; 1857–1866; With: James Wentworth Buller 1857–1865; Sir Thomas Dyke Acland, Bt 1865–1866	Succeeded by Sir Thomas Dyke Acland, Bt; Sir Stafford Northcote, Bt
Political offices
Preceded by Sir James Ferguson, Bt	Under-Secretary of State for India; 1867–1868	Succeeded by M. E. Grant Duff
Honorary titles
Preceded by The Earl of Iddesleigh	Lord Lieutenant of Devon; 1887–1904	Succeeded by Viscount Ebrington
Peerage of the United Kingdom
Preceded by Charles Rodolph Trefusis	Baron Clinton; 1866–1904	Succeeded by Charles Hepburn-Stuart-Forbes-Trefusis
