= Hugh Fortescue, 4th Earl Fortescue =

English politician (1854–1932)

The Right Honourable The Earl Fortescue KCB
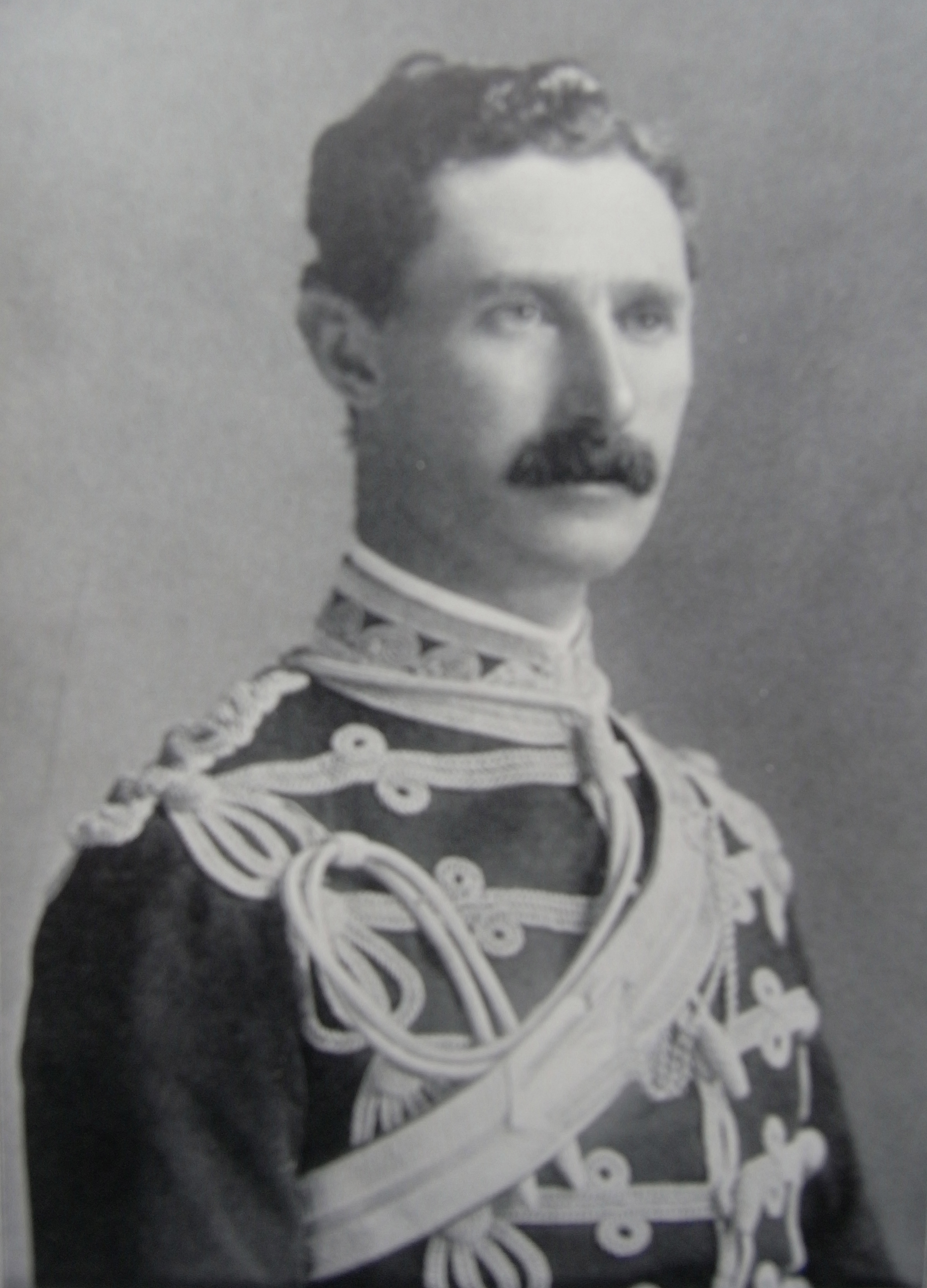
- Hugh Fortescue, 4th Earl Fortescue (1854–1932), KCB, ADC, Lord Lieutenant of Devon, Lt. Col. of Royal North Devon Hussars

Member of Parliament for Tiverton
- In office 1881–1885 Serving with John Heathcote-Amery
- Preceded by: William Massey; John Heathcote-Amery
- Succeeded by: Sir William Walrond

Member of Parliament for Tavistock
- In office 1885–1892
- Preceded by: Lord Arthur Russell
- Succeeded by: Hugh Luttrell

Lord Lieutenant of Devon
- In office 1904–1928
- Preceded by: The Lord Clinton
- Succeeded by: The Lord Mildmay of Flete

Personal details
- Born: 16 April 1854
- Died: 29 October 1932 (aged 78)
- Party: Liberal; Liberal Unionist
- Spouse: Hon. Emily Ormsby-Gore (m. 1886)
- Children: 3
- Parents: Hugh Fortescue, 3rd Earl Fortescue (father); Lady Georgiana Dawson-Damer (mother)
- Relatives: George Lionel Dawson-Damer (maternal grandfather); Lionel Dawson-Damer (uncle); Hugh William Fortescue (son); Denzil George Fortescue (son); George Dawson-Damer (cousin)
- Education: Harrow School; Trinity College, Cambridge

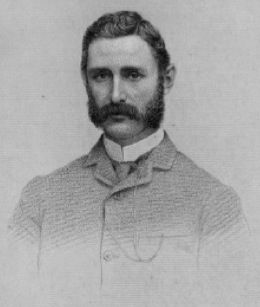
Hugh Fortescue, 4th Earl Fortescue (1854–1932). Engraving by Joseph Brown from a photograph by John Mayall

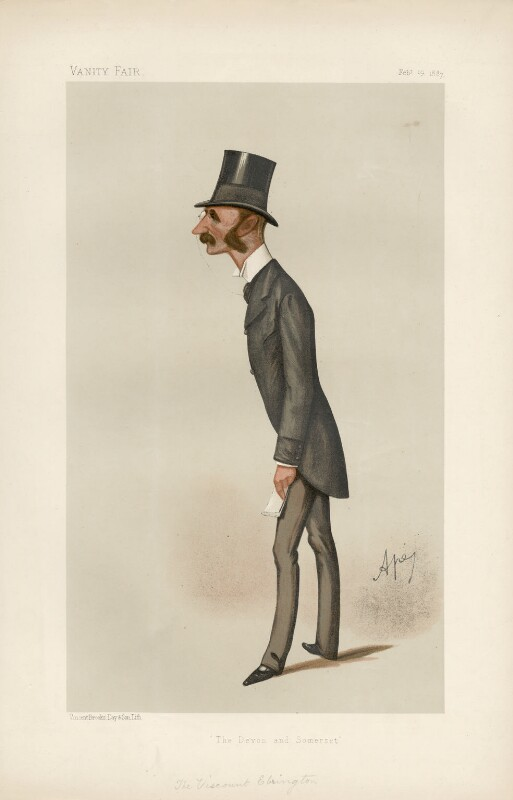
"The Devon and Somerset", caricature of Viscount Ebrington by Ape, Vanity Fair 19 February 1887

Hugh Fortescue, 4th Earl Fortescue KCB (16 April 1854 – 29 October 1932), styled Viscount Ebrington from 1861 to 1905, was an English Liberal and Liberal Unionist politician who sat in the House of Commons from 1881 until 1892 and later in the House of Lords having inherited his father's peerages. He was a famous sportsman in the hunting-field.

== Origins ==
Fortescue was the son of Hugh Fortescue, 3rd Earl Fortescue (1818–1905), whose main seat was Castle Hill, Filleigh, Devon, by his wife Lady Georgiana Augusta Charlotte Caroline Dawson-Damer, daughter of George Lionel Dawson-Damer and sister of Lionel Dawson-Damer, 4th Earl of Portarlington. He was known by his courtesy title of Viscount Ebrington until his father's death in 1905, when he inherited the earldom.

== Career ==
=== Education ===
He was educated at Harrow School and Trinity College, Cambridge. At Cambridge, he was treasurer of the University Pitt Club.

=== Local career in Devon ===
He was a captain in the North Devon Hussar Yeoman Cavalry and became Colonel of the North Devon Yeomanry. He was a J.P. for Devon and for South Molton, the town close to the family seat of Castle Hill, Filleigh. He served as Deputy Lieutenant for Devon and was Lord-Lieutenant of Devon from 1903 to 1928. He was also Chairman of Devon County Council. He was Provincial Grand Master of Freemasons in Devon. He was Master of the Devon and Somerset Staghounds.

=== National career ===
He was at one time private secretary to Lord President of the Council Earl Spencer. He was ADC to King Edward VII from 1903 to 1910 and received a KCB in 1911. He was ADC to King George V from 1910 to 1921. He served as president and chairman of the Territorial Force Advisory Council.

=== Parliamentary career ===
In 1881 Fortescue was elected as a Liberal Member of Parliament (MP) for Tiverton and held the seat until 1885 when representation was reduced to one member under the Redistribution of Seats Act 1885. In 1885 he was elected MP for Tavistock. When the Liberals split in 1886 over Home Rule for Ireland, he joined the breakaway Liberal Unionists. He held the seat until 1892.

== Purchases Exmoor Forest ==
When Viscount Ebrington he purchased the reversion of about 20,000 acres comprising the former royal forest of Exmoor from Sir Frederick Knight (1812–1897) who with his father John Knight (d.1851) had introduced livestock farming to that previously undeveloped and barren moorland. Following the early death of Knight's son Frederick Sebright Winn Knight (1851–1879) in 1879 aged 28, Knight sold the reversion of Exmoor Forest to Ebrington, that is to say he retained a life interest. Ebrington used the residence constructed by James Boevey in 1654 at Simonsbath, ten miles NE of Castle Hill, as a hunting lodge and for his work in continuing agricultural development. He instituted an annual horse show at Exford, which helped to increase the quality of hunters used on Exmoor.

== Death and burial ==
He died at the age of 78.

== Marriage and children ==
Fortescue married his cousin, Hon. Emily Ormsby-Gore, daughter of William Ormsby-Gore, 2nd Baron Harlech, on 15 July 1886. They had three children:

- Hugh William Fortescue, 5th Earl Fortescue (1888–1958)
- Geoffrey Faithful Fortescue (1891–1900), died young.
- Denzil George Fortescue, 6th Earl Fortescue (1893–1977)

Parliament of the United Kingdom
Preceded by William Massey; John Heathcote-Amery	Member of Parliament for Tiverton; 1881–1885; With: John Heathcote-Amery	Succeeded by Sir William Walrond
Preceded by Lord Arthur Russell	Member of Parliament for Tavistock; 1885–1892	Succeeded by Hugh Luttrell
Honorary titles
Preceded by The Lord Clinton	Lord Lieutenant of Devon; 1904–1928	Succeeded by The Lord Mildmay of Flete
Peerage of Great Britain
Preceded by Hugh Fortescue	Earl Fortescue; 1905–1932	Succeeded by Hugh Fortescue
