= 1872 Tiverton by-election =

UK Parliamentary by-election

The 1872 Tiverton by-election was fought on 4 November 1872. The by-election was fought due to the Resignation (Justice of the Court of Common Pleas) of the incumbent MP of the Liberal Party, George Denman. It was won by the Liberal candidate William Massey.
