= Bradfield House =

Country house in Devon, England

Coordinates: 50.88130°N 3.34905°W

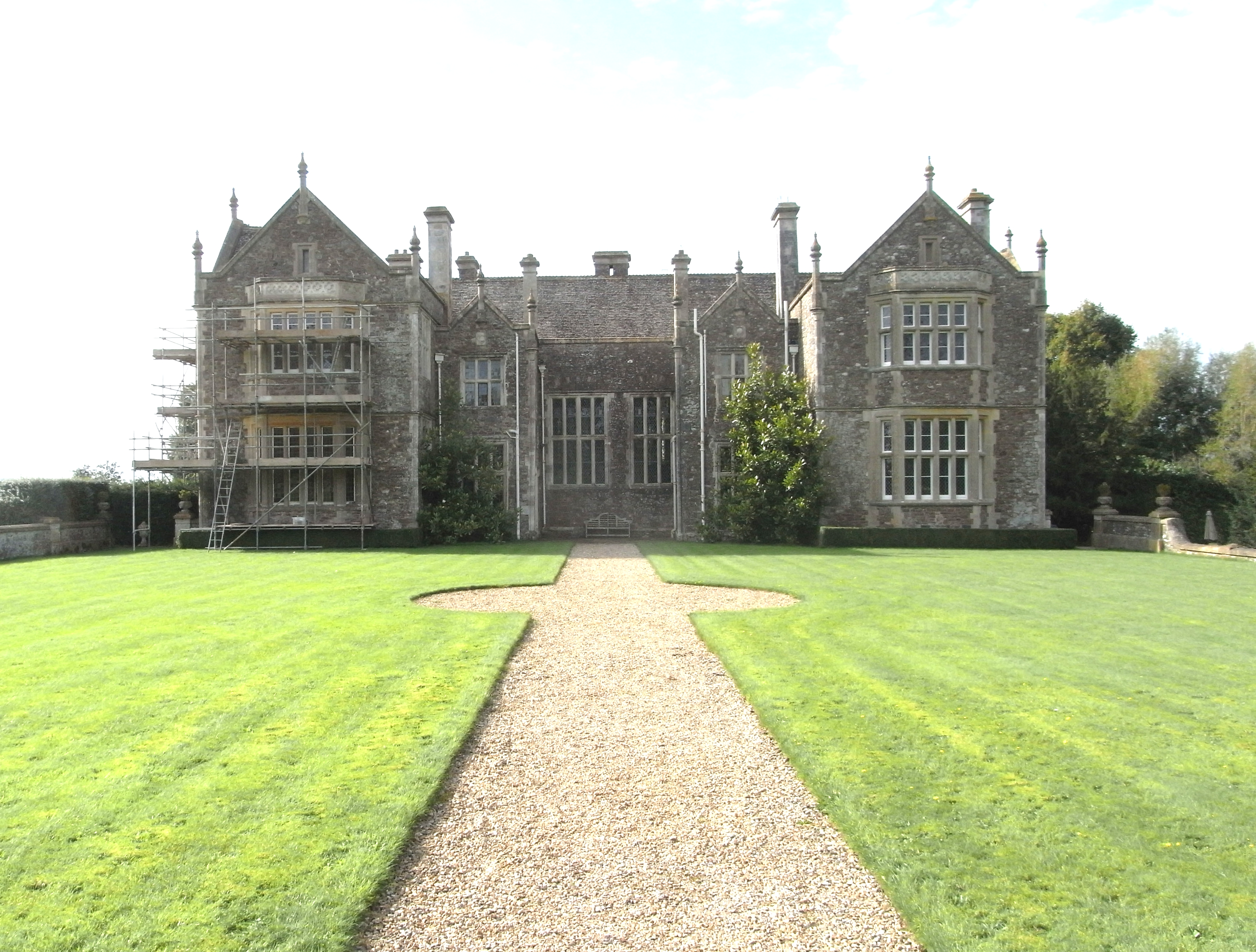
Bradfield House, east front. In the centre is the mediaeval great hall; the projecting gables are from circa 1600, left the drawing room, right the "Spanish Room". The smaller projections in the angles of the corners are left: the original entrance porch, right: the "Oriel Room"

Bradfield House is a Grade I listed country house situated in the parish of Uffculme, Devon, England, 2 miles (3.2 km) south-west of the village of Uffculme.

It is one of the largest mansions in Devon, having been substantially enlarged in about 1860 by Sir John Walrond Walrond, 1st Baronet (1818–1889), to the design of the architect John Hayward, and incorporates within the Victorian structure the original mediaeval great hall, one of the largest, most ornate and best preserved in the county.

== Description ==
The mediaeval great hall forms the core of the house and its tall windows are visible in the centre of the eastern front. The drawing room and Spanish Room were added as projecting gable wings to the south and north ends respectively in the 16th century, and these project forward beyond the original external wall of the hall. A small square porch and Oriel Room were added in 1604 and 1592 respectively and sit within the two corners formed by the projecting gables. In about 1860 a major expansion was made, by the addition of a service wing to the west, almost doubling the size of the house, and a new entrance front, with three storey central porch, was created on the south side.

=== Interior ===
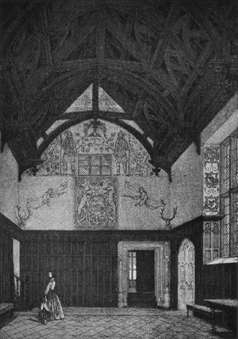
Great Hall, Bradfield House, Devon, looking toward the north gable wall showing the arms of King James I and a crudely executed wall-painting of two soldiers. The Walrond arms can be seen painted on the window splays to the right The door in the back wall leads to the "Spanish Room" via the internal porch. The door to the right leads to the "Oriel Room"

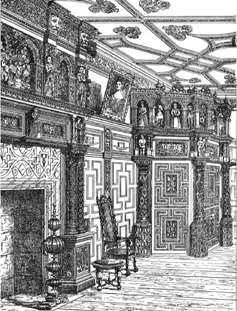
The Parlour or "Spanish Room", Bradfield House, Uffculme, Devon. Showing inner porch

The house contains several remarkable features. The Great Hall with an early 16th-century hammerbeam roof, one of the most ornate in Devon, comparable to those at Weare Giffard Hall and Orleigh Court. It was repaired in 1860. On the wall is linen-fold paneling and a frieze of Renaissance-period heads within square panels. Several heraldic shields of members of the Walrond family impaled with the armorials of their wives are painted on the walls. The Music Room, as it was called by the Walrond family in 1910, Parlour or "Spanish Room" contains a highly decorated plasterwork ceiling with ribs and pendants and exceptionally elaborately carved woodwork. Above the paneling is a frieze of Spanish leather.

=== Grounds ===
The house is surrounded by parkland which retains many magnificent specimen cedar trees. Nearby is the former Home Farm, with a long brick facade pierced by a tall arch leading into the yard. A stable block with bell-tower and clock is located to the west of the house. In 1875, the Walronds built All Saints Chapel, designed by Hayward, to the east of the house with roadside access, slightly to the south of the eastern entrance gate.

== Bradfield Manor ==
The manor of Bradfield was from the 13th century until the early 20th century the principal seat of the Walrond family. Devon seats of cadet lines of this family included Bovey House in the parish of Beer, purchased c. 1670 from Sir William Pole of Shute and inherited from his first wife by John Rolle, 1st Baron Rolle (died 1842)of Bicton, Dunchideock House, the inheritance of Elizabeth Pitman the wife of the 2nd Baron Waleran, and Tidwell House in East Budleigh, from about 1730. In 1876 the Walrond baronetcy "of Bradfield" was created for Sir John Walrond Walrond, 1st Baronet (1818–1899) and the title Baron Waleran, with variant spelling, was created for his son William Walrond, 1st Baron Waleran (1849–1925). On the death of his son the second baron in 1966, the titles became extinct and the family became extinct in the male line.

=== Descent of the manor ===
==== Walrond ====
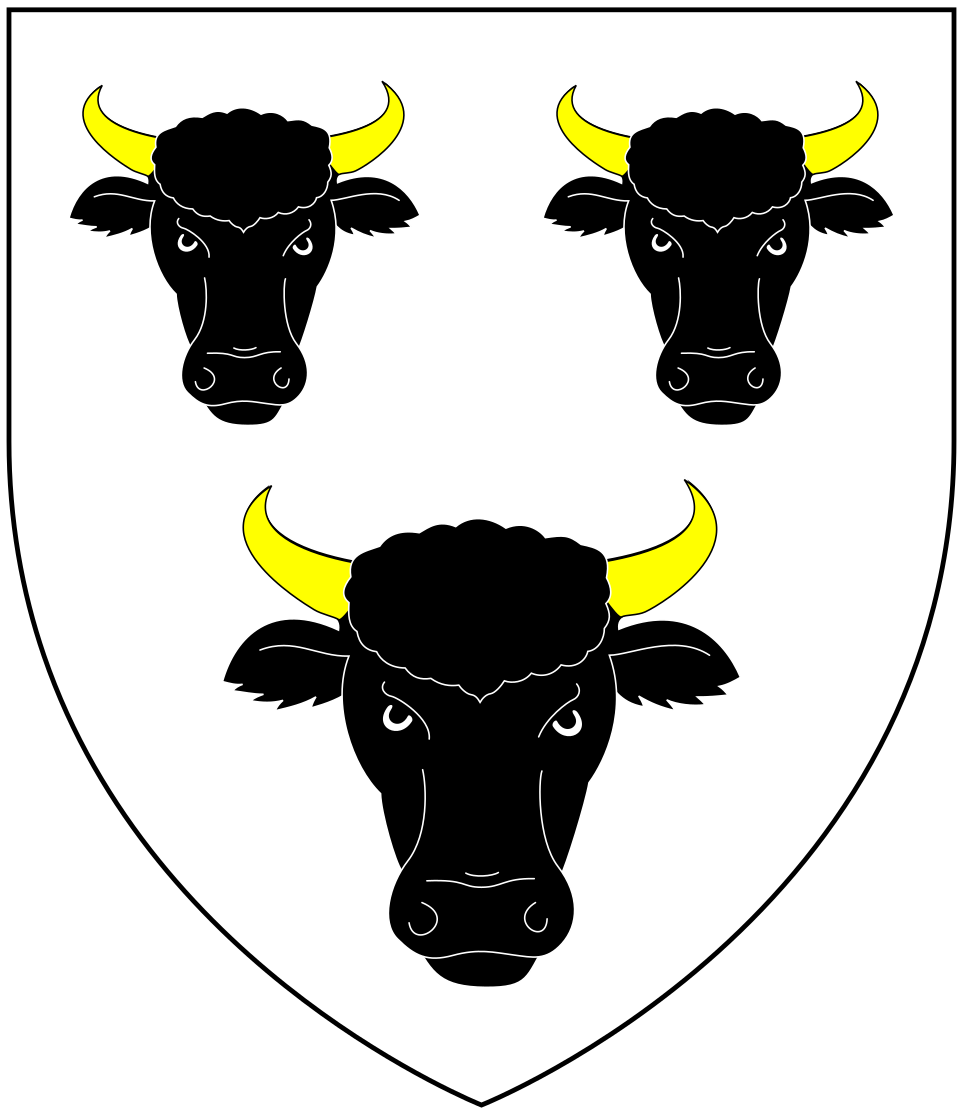
Arms of Walrond of Bradfield, Devon: Argent, three bull's heads cabossed sable armed or; Crest: A heraldic tiger sable pellete

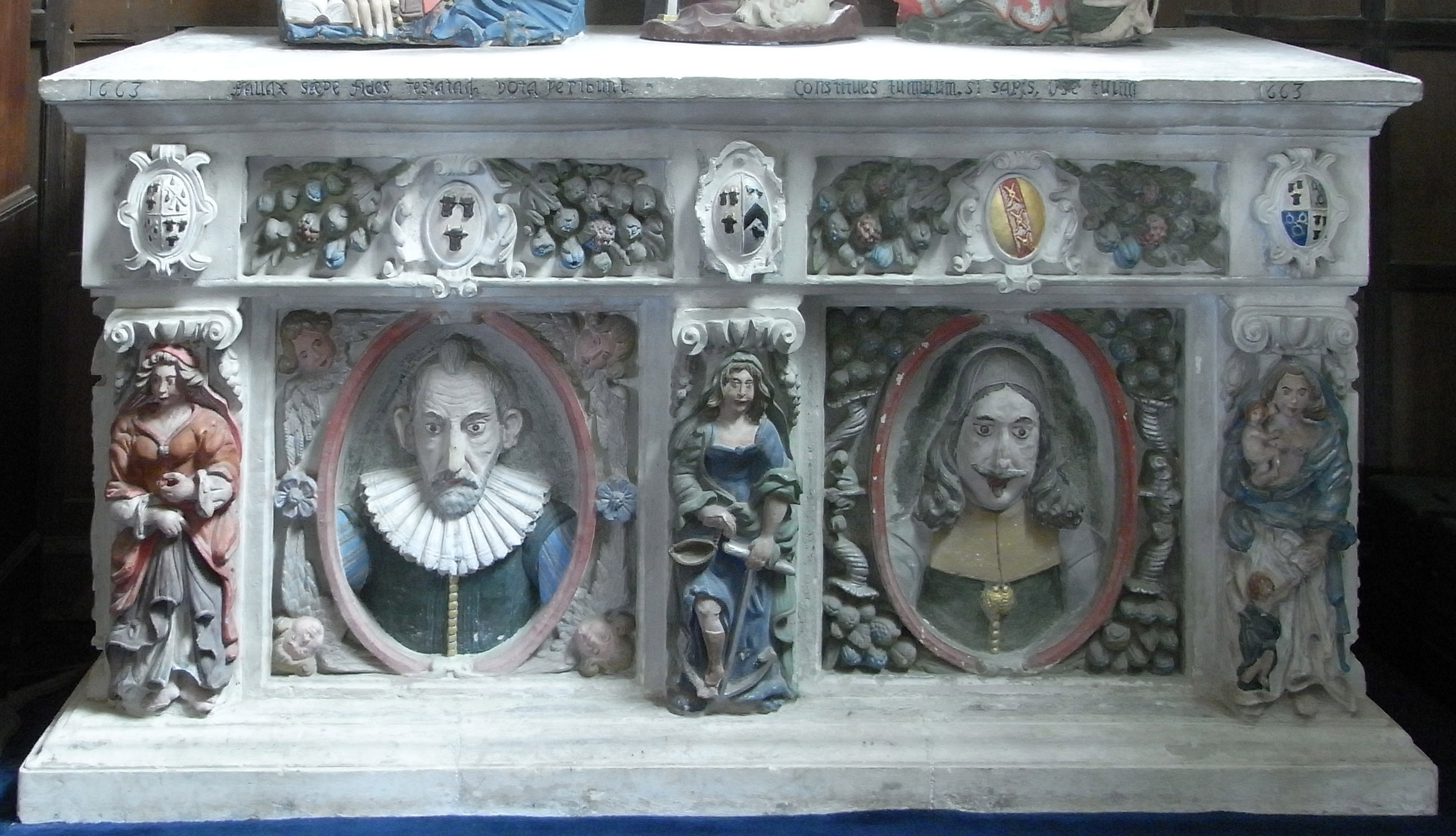
Tomb chest in Bradfield Chapel, north aisle, Uffculme Church, Devon, probably of William Walrond (1610–1669)

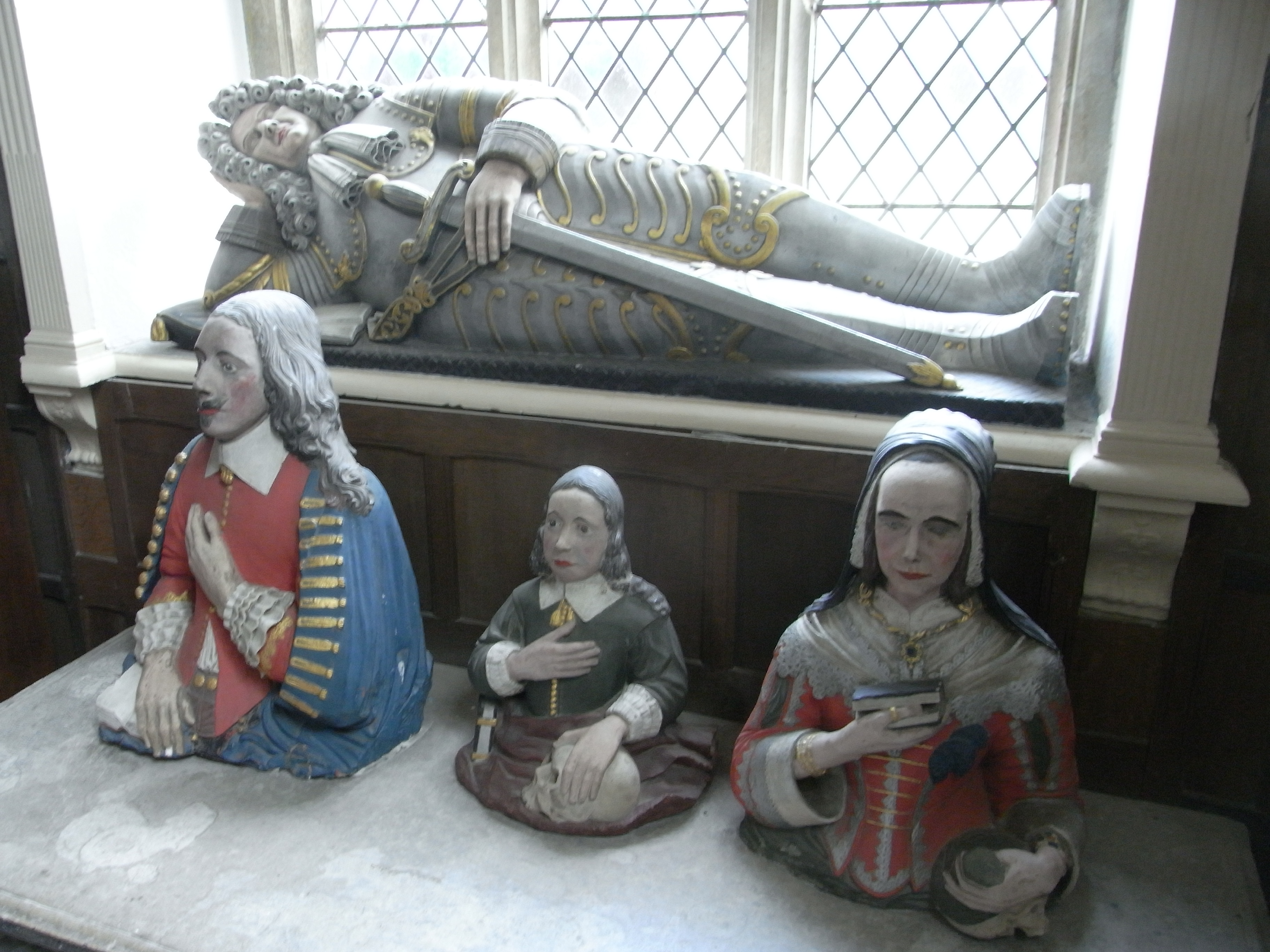
Reclining effigy described by Pevsner as "c. 1700", presumed to be of Sir William Walrond (1639–1689) of Bradfield House. Not in its original position, it was probably formerly surrounded by an elaborate canopy, and the now separate half-figures of mourners, probably representing his wife and children, are now placed in front of him on top of a chest tomb inscribed with the date 1663, probably of his grandfather William Walrond (1610–1669), husband of Ursula Specott

Risdon, writing in about 1630, states that the first occupier of Bradfell was Robert de Bradfell, but by the reign of King Henry III (1216–1272) Richard Walrond was lord of the manor. They added to their holding through the acquisition of the manor of Hurst. The manor of Wood came to the family through their marriage to the heiress Agnes Whiting. The descent of Walrond of Bradfield is thus:

- Richard Walrond, tempore King Henry III (1216–1272). He was the son of Richard de Bradfelle, living tempore King Richard (1189–1199)
- William Walrond (son)
- John Walrond (son)
- John Walrond (son), married Joan Stofford, daughter and heiress of John Stoffard of Stoffard
- William Walrond (son), married a certain Juliana, of unknown family.
- John Walrond (son), married Alice Ufflett, daughter and heiress of John Ufflett by his wife Agnes Fishaker, daughter and heiress of Sir Martyn Fishaker.
- John Walrond (son), married Margaret Moore, daughter of John Moore (died 1510) of nearby Moor Hayes in the parish of Cullompton, by his wife Elizabeth Clivedon (died 1515), whose monument exists in Cullompton (?) Church, daughter and co-heiress of John Clivedon of Willond Burlescombe, a nearby parish. Margaret's brother was Richard More (died 1516), Archdeacon of Exeter and Treasurer of Exeter Cathedral, where his monument exists. John IV's 2nd son Humphry Walrond founded the Walrond family of Clist.
- John Walrond (eldest son)
- Humphrey Walrond, married Elinor Ogan, daughter of Henry Ogan of Saltwinch, Somerset.
- Henry Walrond (died 1550) (son), married Agnes Whitinge, 2nd daughter and co-heiress of John Whitinge (died 1529) of Woode, in the nearby parish of Kentisbeare. John Whitinge was a member of the Merchant Venturers and his elaborately panelled chest tomb survives in Kentisbeare Church, in the chapel at the east end of the south aisle, which he built. The two monumental brasses which were originally affixed to the monument are now lost, but his armorials survive sculpted on the wooden screen. John Whiting left four daughters and co-heiresses. Wood passed to the Walrond family, and appears to have been used as a secondary residence and dower house as several members of the family were subsequently buried in Kentisbeare Church.
- Humphrey Walrond (died 1586) (son), married Mary Willoughby (died 1556), daughter of Sir Thomas Willoughby, Justice of the Common Pleas. Had 6 sons, son William Inherited.
- William Walrond (c1550 – c. 1627) (son), married Mary Sandford (died 1587), daughter of Nicholas Sandford and widow of John Warre of Somerset
- Henry Walrond (1584–1650) (son), a lawyer admitted to the Inner Temple in 1603, married Penelope Sydenham, daughter of Humphry Sydenham of Dulverton, Somerset. He was buried at Kentisbeare. He had 4 sons and 9 daughters, one of whom, Anne Walrond, in 1646 married Robert Shapcote (b. 1621), four times Member of Parliament for Tiverton in 1646–1649, 1654, 1656 and 1660 and Attorney-General for Ireland.
- William Walrond (1610-1667/9) (eldest son), who in 1637 married Ursula Specott (died 1698), daughter of Humphrey Specott of Launcells in Cornwall. Ursula was buried at Kentisbeare. A chest tomb exists in Bradfield Chapel, north aisle, Uffculme Church. The arms above the relief bust figure on the right are those of Specott (Or, on a bend gules three millrinds of the first) and the bust portrays William. His grandfather, also William, is shown on the left side in a relief bust below a cartouche with the Walrond arms. Five standing female figures are shown, at the west end, a blindfolded Justice, also Faith Hope & Charity. The chest tomb is complete in itself, and the half-figures presently placed on top of it belong to a former now broken up monument, probably that of the reclining Sir William Walrond (died 1689), whose effigy now occupied the window-ledge above. On the top slab is inscribed:

"This lowe built chamber to each obvious eye
Seemes like a little chapell where he lye
Here in this tumbe my flesh shall rest in hope
When ere I dye this is my aime & scope".

On the front edge of the top slab is written: "1663 ffalax saepe fides testam. vota peribunt constitues tumulum si sapis ipse tuum fulim? 1663" (faith often fails, testamentary vows perish, ....).

- Sir William Walrond (1639–1689) (son), served as a Cavalier, was knighted on 25 May 1671 at Bedford and served as Sheriff of Devon. He built the chapel, no longer existing, to the north side of the house, as evidenced by a deed quoted in the "Walrond Papers" (1913): "Licence to publicly read morning and evening prayer in the chapel newly erected by William Walrond, knight, at Bradfield". He died unmarried but clearly intended at some time to marry Dinah Mompesson, daughter of Thomas Mompesson, Esquire, of Corton, Wiltshire, as is evidenced by the existence of a marriage settlement dated 1671/2. The Walrond Papers state that no marriage took place but rather only a romance, from which there survived in 1910 a letter written on gold leaf enclosed in a petit-point jewelled envelope, with the top part of a gauntlet glove with some lady's gloves. Sir William Walrond appears to be represented by the reclining effigy dressed in a full wig and full armour in the Bradfield Chapel, Uffculme Church, which now occupies the window ledge, but was no doubt originally surrounded by an elaborate canopy, long since dismantled. His heir was his younger brother Henry.

Arms of Walrond impaling Floyer (Sable, a chevron between three arrows argent). Detail from pulpit in St Mary the Virgin church, Uffculme. This refers to the marriage of Henry III Walrond (d.1724) to his second wife Elizabeth Floyer (d.1749), a daughter of William Floyer of Floyer Hayes near Exeter

- Col. Henry Walrond (died 1724) (brother), who succeeded his elder brother Sir William Waldron (1639–1689). He trained as a lawyer and was admitted to the Inner Temple in 1662. He was the owner of Bradfield House when William of Orange landed at Torbay on 6 November 1688. One of the Prince's generals used the house for his headquarters as is evidenced by a report written in Dutch addressed to unknown persons: "We have taken up our quarters in the house of Col. Hendric Waldron which quarters we desire shall be kept open as long as the troops of his highness shall remain in this town or neighbourhood. We have also left in the care of the aforesaid Col. Hendric Waldron two black horses and one grey mare which shall be kept for us. Signed by Sir Van Ginkel, Lt-General of the cavalry of the United Netherlands, in the service of his highness William Prince of Orange". He married twice, firstly in 1698 to Elizabeth Strode, a daughter by his 1st wife of Sir William Strode (1614–1676), MP, of Newnham, Plympton St Mary and widow of Joseph (or Capt. Francis)Maynard of Tavistock, only surviving son of Sir John Maynard. He married secondly Elizabeth Floyer (died 1749), daughter of William Floyer of Floyer Hayes in the parish of St Thomas, Exeter, and widow of James Holway of Uffculme. The marriage was without children. The Floyer armorials are Sable, a chevron between three arrows argent and can be seen impaled with Walrond sculpted on the wooded pulpit in Uffculme Church, and on the chest-tomb presumed to be of his father William Walrond (died 1667/9).
- William Walrond (died 1745/6) (son), married Ann Courtenay, a daughter of Francis Courtenay (1652–1699) of Powderham and Forde House, Wolborough, by his wife Mary Bovey. The Courtenays were the leading gentry family of Devon. Francis was the eldest son of Sir William Courtenay, 1st Baronet (died 1702), but predeceased his father and thus did not inherit the baronetcy.
- Courtenay Walrond (died 1761) (eldest son), married the daughter of a certain Mr Saunders of Bradninch but died without children. His heir was his younger brother Henry.
- Rev. Henry Walrond (died 1787) (brother), Rector of Woolfardisworthy, married Dorothy Milford.
- William Henry Walrond (1762–1845) (son), married in 1759 Mary Alford of Sandford in Devon, who left no male children but two daughters his co-heiresses, Margaret the youngest who died unmarried and Frances Walrond who in 1815 married Benjamin Bowden Dickinson (1793–1851), JP, DL, Sheriff of Devon in 1824, the son of John Dickinson (died 1813), by his wife Harriet Bowden, a wealthy Tiverton merchant, who assumed by royal licence on the death in 1845 of his father-in-law, the name and arms of Walrond. John Dickinson was the son of Benjamin Dickinson (1737–1806), three times mayor of Tiverton, who opened the first bank in that town near St George's Church, which he played a part in the construction of and where is located his mural monument. Benjamin's mother was of the Peard family, the sister of Oliver Peard (1700–1764), three times mayor, "the greatest merchant who ever lived in Tiverton". He was a serge trader via Topsham with the Netherlands. In 1764 Peard tore up his will and "blasted his face off with a blunderbuss" in Fore Street, where his business was based. His fortune passed to his sister Mary, and thence to the Dickinson family.

==== Dickinson / Walrond ====
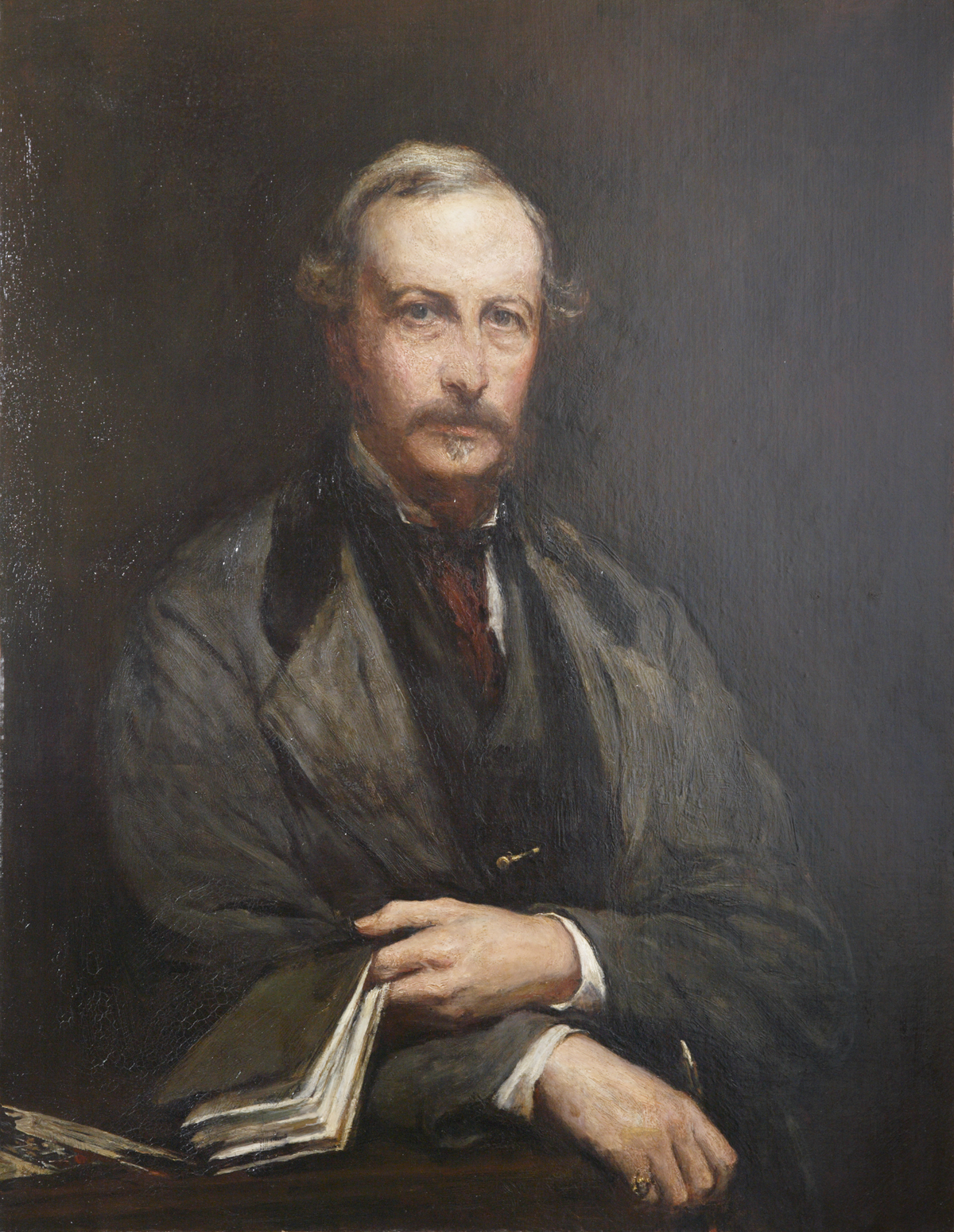
Sir John Walrond, 1st Baronet (1818–1889), President of the Royal Devon and Exeter Hospital (1874), and Benefactor. Portrait by George Frederic Watts (1817–1904). Commissioned by the Trustees of the Royal Devon and Exeter Hospital. Collection of the Royal Devon and Exeter Hospital, Exeter, Devon

- Sir John Walrond Walrond, 1st Baronet (1818–1889) (son), Conservative MP for Tiverton in 1866, born John Walrond Dickinson, who assumed the surname and arms of Walrond in 1845 at the same time as did his father. He was the son of Benjamin Bowden Dickinson (1793–1851) by his wife the heiress Frances Walrond. He was created a baronet "of Bradfield" in 1876. He married Hon. Frances Caroline Hood, daughter of Samuel Hood, 2nd Baron Bridport (1788–1868). On inheriting Bradfield House he found it in a state of disrepair and decided to restore it. In about 1860 he greatly expanded the house by adding the west service wing, at the same time he restored the Tudor aspect of the east front. In 1867, perhaps to assist in financing his works, he sold the Knightshayes estate, long a Dickinson possession, to the Amory family. He was a benefactor of the Royal Devon and Exeter Hospital in Exeter and served as its president in 1874. His portrait by George Frederic Watts (1817–1904) survives in the hospital's collection.
- William Hood Walrond, 1st Baron Waleran (1849–1925) (son), Captain, Grenadier Guards, Lt- Col. of the Devon Rifle Volunteers, MP for East Devon in 1880, created "Baron Waleran of Uffculme" in 1905. His eldest son Hon. William Lionel Thomas Waleran (1876–1915), MP, predeceased him.
- William George Hood Walrond, 2nd Baron Waleran (1905–1966), grandson of Sir John Walrond, 1st Bt. He died without male issue, whereupon the titles and male line of Walrond of Bradfield became extinct.

==== Recent ownership ====
After having been vacated by the Walrond family, Mr Lytebaum established at Bradfield a boys' school, known as "Bradfield House School" which it remained until its closure on 23 July 1997 It was a residential boys' schools catering for boys with emotional and behavioural problems, the last establishment having been run by Devon County Council. In 1996 the police with child protection officers opened an investigation into allegations of sexual and physical abuse in the school, but no evidence was discovered to support such claims. In 1997, the year it of its closure, Government statistics revealed that of all youths appearing at nearby Cullompton Magistrates' Court, one third gave Bradfield House as their address. The once ornate formal topiary gardens were destroyed during this period. The house is now maintained as a private residence.

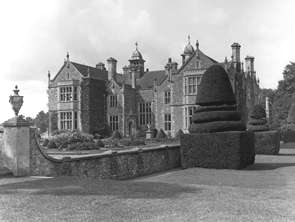
Bradfield House, east front, photographed from NE in 1904, when still occupied by the Walrond family, showing the formal topiary garden

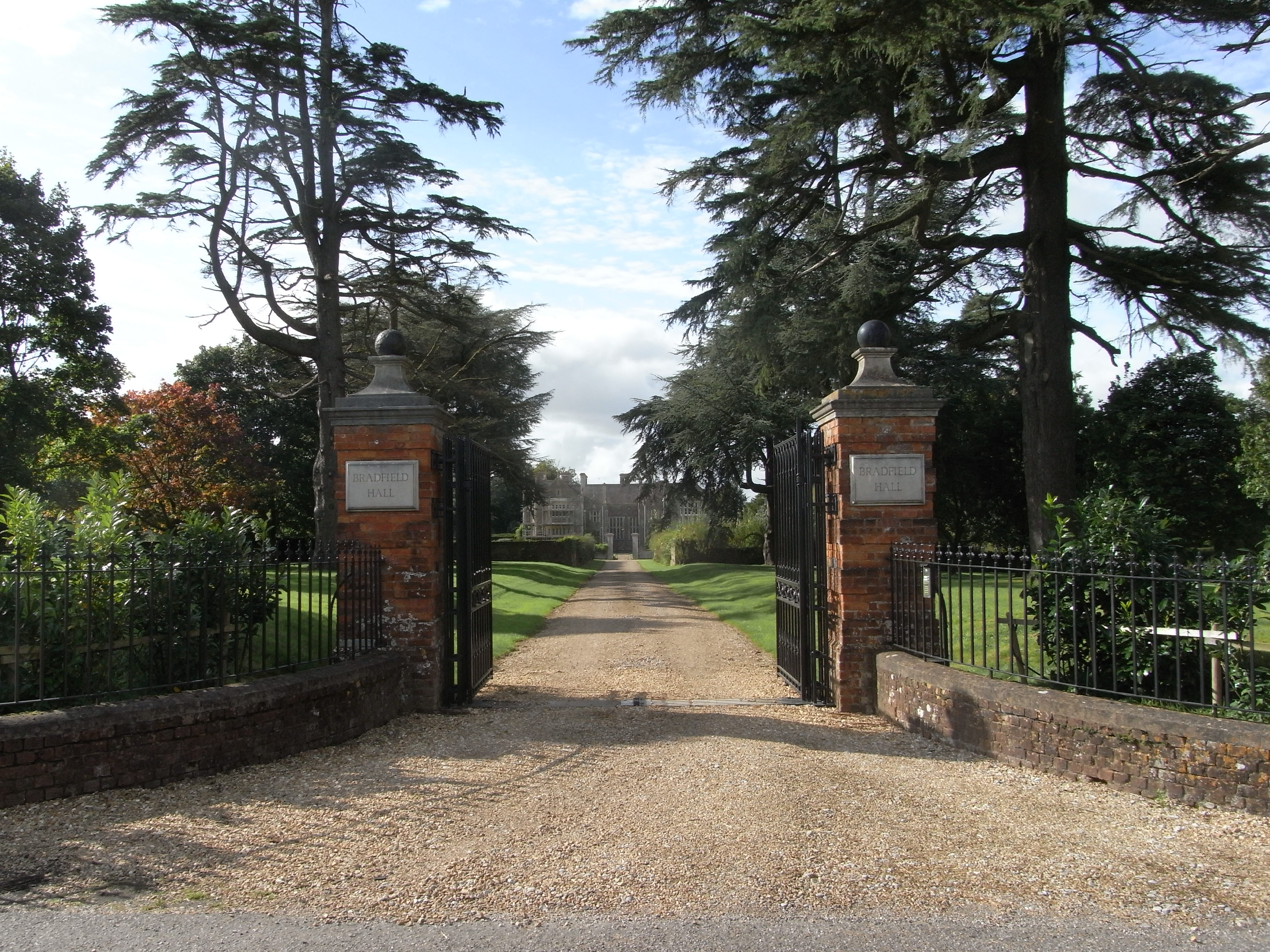
Eastern approach

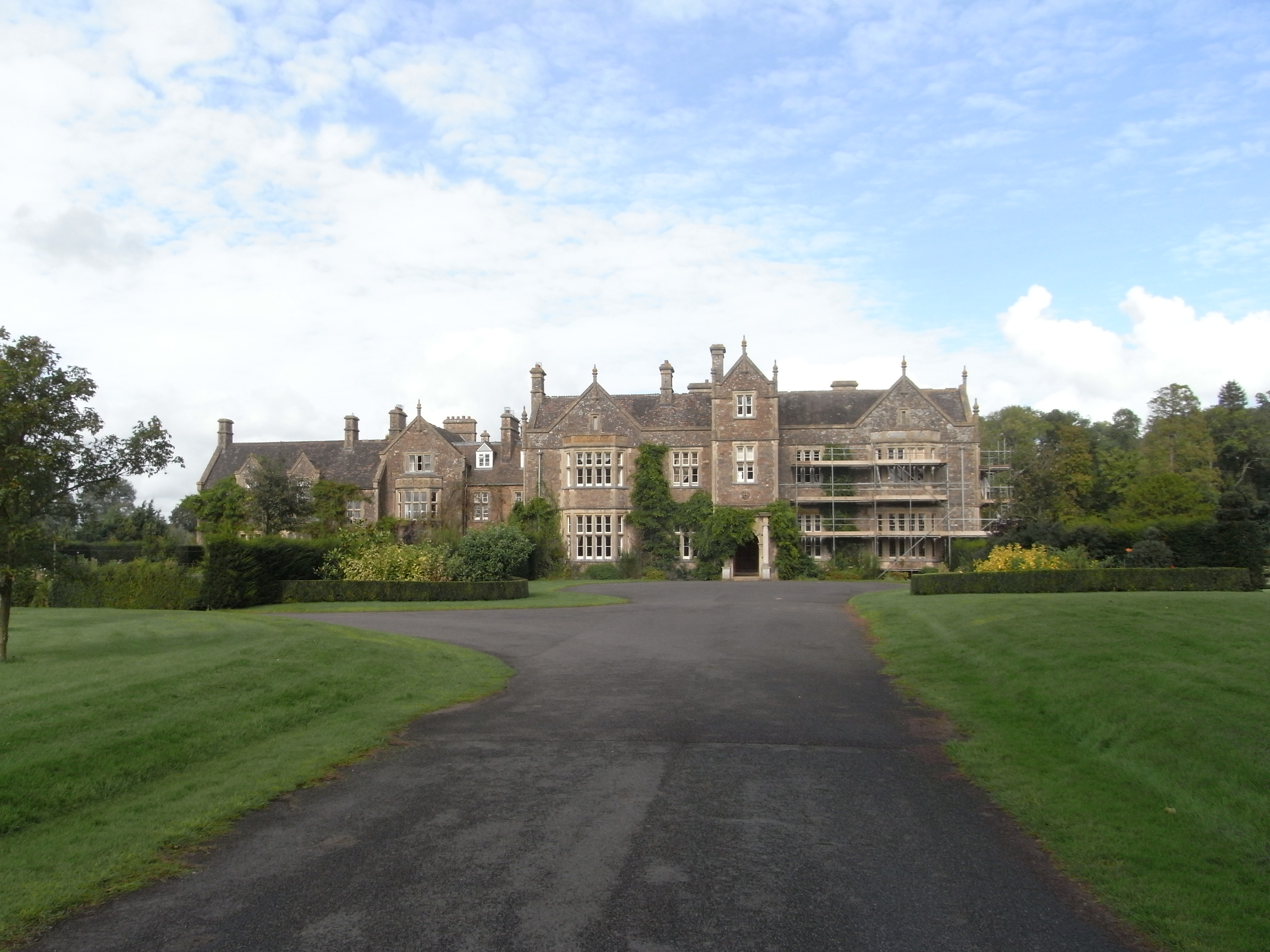
The Victorian south front, c. 1860. The service wing is to the left (west), set back from the main entrance front

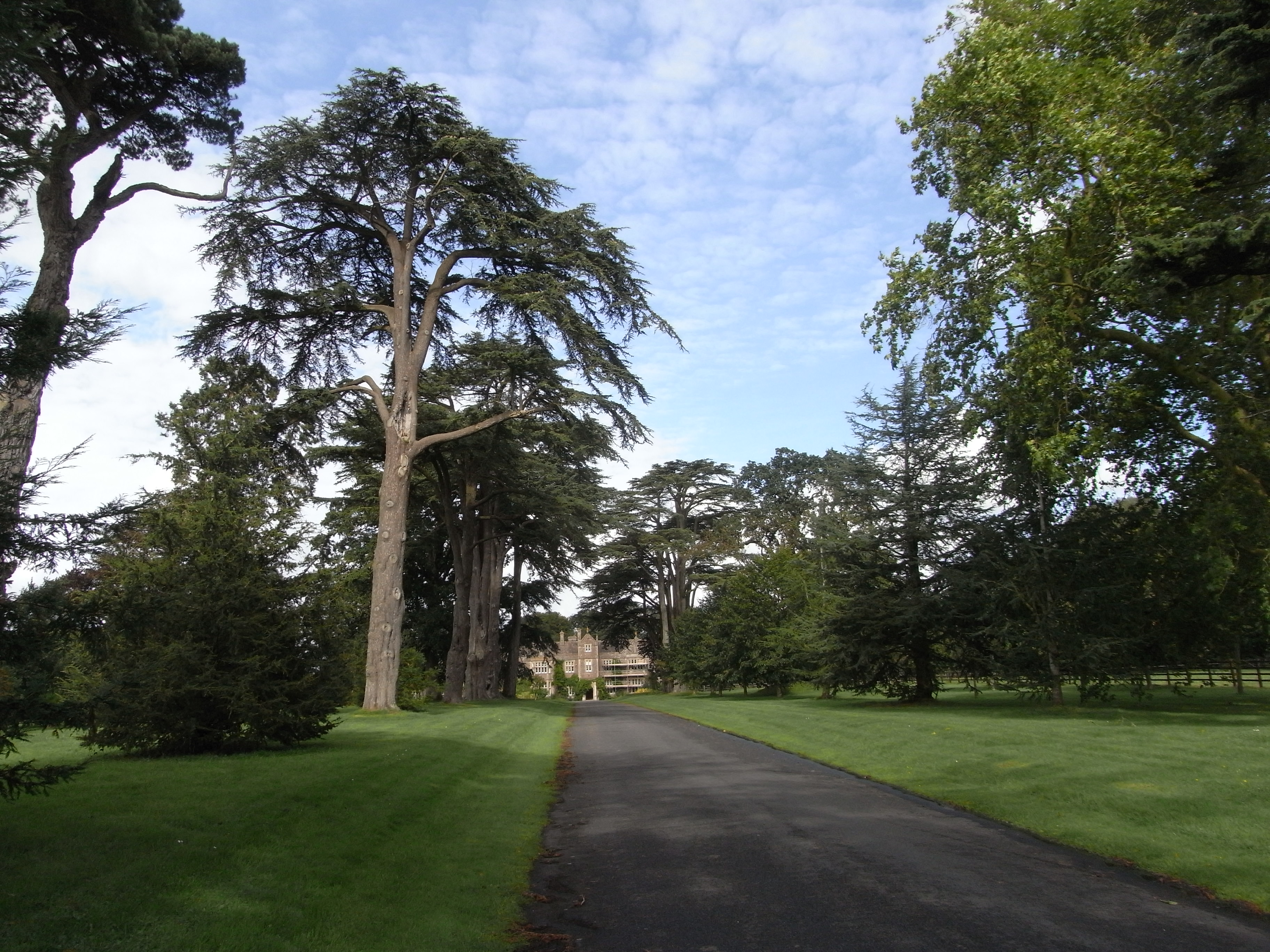
Approach from southern entrance lodge

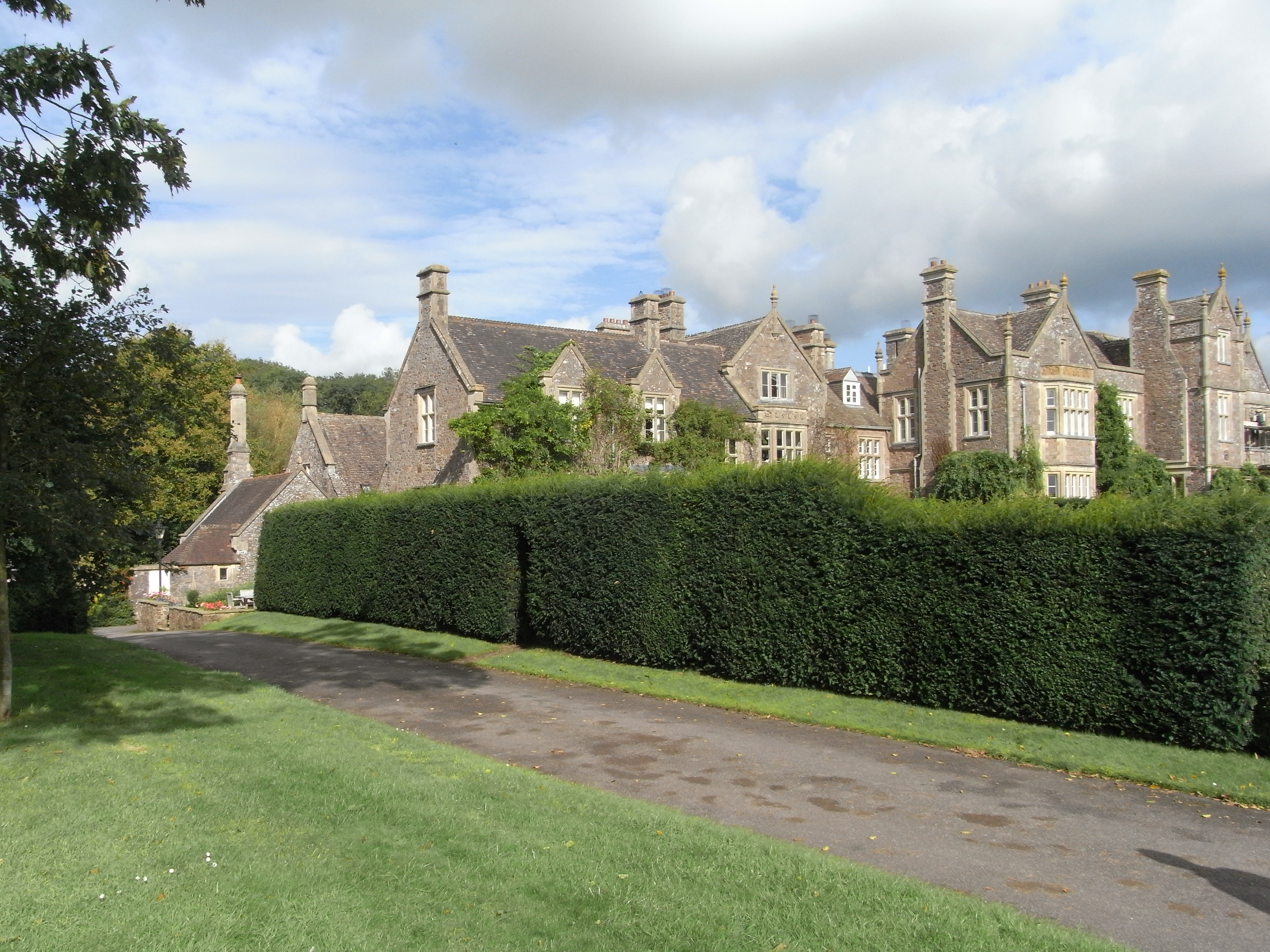
Victorian west (service) wing, c. 1860, viewed from SW
