= Tiverton (constituency) =

Former parliamentary constituency in the United Kingdom

- Former county constituency for the House of Commons
- Tiverton in Devon 1983-1997
- County: Devon

1885–1997
- Seats: One
- Replaced by: Tiverton & Honiton

1621–1885
- Seats: Two
- Type of constituency: Borough constituency

Tiverton in Devon 1885-1918

Tiverton was a constituency located in Tiverton in east Devon, formerly represented in the House of Commons of England until 1707, Great Britain until 1800 and after 1801 the Parliament of the United Kingdom. Enfranchised as a parliamentary borough in 1615 and first represented in 1621, it elected two Members of Parliament (MPs) by the first past the post system of election until 1885. The name was then transferred to a county constituency electing one MP. (Between 1885 and 1918, the constituency was alternatively called Devon, North East.)

In 1997, it was merged with the neighbouring constituency of Honiton to form the Tiverton and Honiton constituency.

Prime Minister Lord Palmerston was a former MP for the seat.

== Boundaries ==
1885–1918: The Municipal Borough of Tiverton, and the Sessional Divisions of Cullompton and Wonford.

1918–1950: The Municipal Borough of Tiverton, the Urban Districts of Bampton and Dawlish, the Rural Districts of Oulmstock and Tiverton, and parts of the Rural Districts of Newton Abbot and St Thomas.

1950–1974: The Municipal Borough of Tiverton, the Urban Districts of Dawlish and Teignmouth, the Rural District of Tiverton, and part of the Rural District of St Thomas.

1974–1983: The Municipal Borough of Tiverton, the Urban Districts of Crediton, Dawlish, and Teignmouth, the Rural Districts of Crediton and Tiverton, and part of the Rural District of St Thomas.

1983–1997: The District of Mid Devon wards of Boniface, Bradninch, Cadbury, Canal, Canonsleigh, Castle, Clare, Cullompton Outer, Cullompton Town, Culm, East Creedy, Halberton, Lawrence, Lowman, Newbrooke, Paullet, Sandford, Shuttern, Silverton, Upper Culm, Upper Yeo, Westexe North, Westexe South, Willand, and Yeo, and the District of East Devon wards of Broadclyst, Clystbeare, Clyst Valley, Exe Valley, Ottery St Mary Rural, Ottery St Mary Town, and Tale Vale.

== Members of Parliament ==
=== Tiverton borough, 1621–1885 ===
Year	First member	First party	Second member	Second party
1621–1622	John Bampfield		John Davie	
1624-March 1625	Sir George Chudleigh		Humphrey Were	
April–August 1625	Rowland St John		John Francis	
December 1625 – 1626	John Drake sat for Devon replaced by Richard Oliver		Peter Ball	
1628–1629	John Bluett		Peter Ball	
No Parliament summoned 1629-40
April 1640	Peter Sainthill	Royalist	Peter Ball	
November 1640	Peter Sainthill	Royalist	George Hartnall	Royalist
January 1644	Sainthill and Hartnall disabled from sitting - both seats vacant			
1646	Robert Shapcote		John Elford	
December 1648	Shapcote excluded in Pride's Purge - seat vacant		Elford not recorded as sitting after Pride's Purge	
1653	Tiverton was unrepresented in the Barebones Parliament			
1654	Robert Shapcote		Tiverton had only one seat in the First and Second Parliaments of the Protectorate	
1656	Robert Shapcote		Tiverton had only one seat in the First and Second Parliaments of the Protectorate	
January 1659	Francis Warner		Sir Coplestone Bampfylde	
May 1659	Not represented in the restored Rump			
April 1660	Robert Shapcote		Thomas Bampfylde	
July 1660	Robert Shapcote		Roger Colman	
November 1660	Robert Shapcote		Henry Newte	
1661	Sir Thomas Carew, Bt		Sir Thomas Stucley	
1664	Sir Thomas Carew, Bt		Sir Henry Ford	
1673	Samuel Foote		Sir Henry Ford	
1685	Sir Hugh Acland		William Colman	
1689	Samuel Foote		William Colman	
1690	Samuel Foote		Thomas Bere	
1691	Sir Anthony Keck		Thomas Bere	
1695	Lord Spencer	Whig	Thomas Bere	
1702	Robert Burridge		Thomas Bere	
1708	Richard Mervin		Thomas Bere	
1710	Sir Edward Northey		John Worth	
1715	Sir Edward Northey		Thomas Bere	
1722	Arthur Arscott		Thomas Bere	
1726	Arthur Arscott		George Deane	
1727	Arthur Arscott		Sir William Yonge, Bt	Whig
1728 by-election	Arthur Arscott		James Nelthorpe	
1734	Arthur Arscott		(Sir) Dudley Ryder	
July 1747	Sir William Yonge, Bt	Whig	(Sir) Dudley Ryder	
December 1747 by-election	Henry Conyngham		(Sir) Dudley Ryder	
1754	Sir William Yonge, Bt	Whig	Henry Pelham	
1755 by-election	Thomas Ryder		Henry Pelham	
1756 by-election	Nathaniel Ryder		Henry Pelham	
1758 by-election	Nathaniel Ryder		Sir Edward Hussey-Montagu	
1762 by-election	Nathaniel Ryder		Charles Gore	
1768	Nathaniel Ryder		Sir John Duntze, Bt	
1776 by-election	John Eardley Wilmot		Sir John Duntze, Bt	
1784	Hon. Dudley Ryder	Tory	Sir John Duntze, Bt	
1795 by-election	Hon. Dudley Ryder	Tory	Hon. Richard Ryder	Tory
1803 by-election	William Fitzhugh	Tory	Hon. Richard Ryder	Tory
1819 by-election	Viscount Sandon	Tory	Hon. Richard Ryder	Tory
1830	Viscount Sandon	Tory	Hon. Granville Ryder	Tory
1831	Spencer Perceval	Tory	Hon. Granville Ryder	Tory
1832	John Heathcoat	Whig	James Kennedy	Radical
1835 by-election	John Heathcoat	Whig	The Viscount Palmerston	Whig
1859	Hon. George Denman	Liberal	The Viscount Palmerston	Liberal
1865	John Walrond, of Bradfield, Uffculme	Conservative	The Viscount Palmerston	Liberal
1866 by-election	John Walrond, of Bradfield, Uffculme	Conservative	Hon. George Denman	Liberal
1868	John Heathcoat-Amory	Liberal	Hon. George Denman	Liberal
1872 by-election	John Heathcoat-Amory	Liberal	William Nathaniel Massey	Liberal
1881 by-election	John Heathcoat-Amory	Liberal	Viscount Ebrington	Liberal
1885	Reduced to one member			

=== County constituency, 1885–1997 ===
Election	Member	Party
1885	Sir William Walrond	Conservative
1906	Hon. William Walrond	Conservative
1915 by-election	Charles Carew	Conservative
1922	Herbert Sparkes	Conservative
1923 by-election	Sir Francis Dyke Acland, Bt	Liberal
1924	Gilbert Acland-Troyte	Conservative
1945	Derick Heathcoat-Amory	Conservative
1960 by-election	Robin Maxwell-Hyslop	Conservative
1992	Angela Browning	Conservative
1997	constituency abolished: see Tiverton & Honiton	

== Election results ==
=== Elections in the 1830s ===
General election 1830: Tiverton (2 seats)
Party	Candidate	Votes	%
Tory	Viscount Sandon	Unopposed	
Tory	Granville Ryder	Unopposed	
Registered electors		24	
Tory hold			
Tory hold			

General election 1831: Tiverton (2 seats)
Party	Candidate	Votes	%
Tory	Spencer Perceval (junior)	Unopposed	
Tory	Granville Ryder	Unopposed	
Registered electors		24	
Tory hold			
Tory hold			

General election 1832: Tiverton (2 seats)
Party	Candidate	Votes	%
Whig	John Heathcoat	376	51.1
Radical	James Kennedy	265	36.0
Whig	Benjamin Wood	55	7.5
Whig	Charles Chichester	40	5.4
Turnout		402	87.0
Registered electors		462	
Majority		111	15.1
Whig gain from Tory			
Majority		210	28.5
Radical gain from Tory			

Kennedy's election was declared void on petition, causing a by-election.

By-election, 24 May 1833: Tiverton
Party	Candidate	Votes	%	±%
Radical	James Kennedy	214	69.3	+33.3
Whig	Benjamin Wood	95	30.7	−33.3
Majority		119	38.6	+10.1
Turnout		309	66.9	−20.1
Registered electors		462		
Radical hold		Swing	+33.3	

General election 1835: Tiverton (2 seats)
Party	Candidate	Votes	%	±%
Whig	John Heathcoat	366	49.1	−2.0
Radical	James Kennedy	184	24.7	−11.3
Whig	Charles Chichester	134	18.0	+12.6
Conservative	J Langmead	62	8.3	New
Turnout		c. 373	c. 78.9	c. −8.1
Registered electors		473		
Majority		182	24.4	+9.3
Whig hold		Swing	+1.8	
Majority		50	6.7	−21.8
Radical hold		Swing	−11.0	

Kennedy resigned, causing a by-election.

By-election, 1 June 1835: Tiverton
Party	Candidate	Votes	%
Whig	Viscount Palmerston	Unopposed	
Whig gain from Radical			

General election 1837: Tiverton (2 seats)
Party	Candidate	Votes	%	±%
Whig	John Heathcoat	323	43.1	−6.0
Whig	Viscount Palmerston	246	32.8	+14.8
Conservative	Benjamin Bowden Dickinson	180	24.0	+15.7
Majority		66	8.8	N/A
Turnout		420	84.3	c. +5.4
Registered electors		498		
Whig hold		Swing	−6.9	
Whig gain from Radical		Swing	+3.5	

=== Elections in the 1840s ===
General election 1841: Tiverton (2 seats)
Party	Candidate	Votes	%	±%
Whig	Viscount Palmerston	Unopposed		
Whig	John Heathcoat	Unopposed		
Registered electors		478		
Whig hold				
Whig hold				

Palmerston was appointed Secretary of State for Foreign Affairs, requiring a by-election.

By-election, 10 July 1846: Tiverton
Party	Candidate	Votes	%	±%
Whig	Viscount Palmerston	Unopposed		
Whig hold				

General election 1847: Tiverton (2 seats)
Party	Candidate	Votes	%	±%
Whig	John Heathcoat	148	53.8	N/A
Whig	Viscount Palmerston	127	46.2	N/A
Chartist	George Julian Harney	0	0.0	New
Majority		127	46.2	N/A
Turnout		138 (est)	30.9 (est)	N/A
Registered electors		445		
Whig hold		Swing	N/A	
Whig hold		Swing	N/A	

=== Elections in the 1850s ===
General election 1852: Tiverton (2 seats)
Party	Candidate	Votes	%	±%
Whig	Viscount Palmerston	Unopposed		
Whig	John Heathcoat	Unopposed		
Registered electors		461		
Whig hold				
Whig hold				

Palmerston was appointed Home Secretary, requiring a by-election.

By-election, 3 January 1853: Tiverton
Party	Candidate	Votes	%	±%
Whig	Viscount Palmerston	Unopposed		
Whig hold				

Palmerston became Prime Minister and First Lord of the Treasury, requiring a by-election.

By-election, 12 February 1855: Tiverton
Party	Candidate	Votes	%	±%
Whig	Viscount Palmerston	Unopposed		
Whig hold				

General election 1857: Tiverton (2 seats)
Party	Candidate	Votes	%	±%
Whig	Viscount Palmerston	Unopposed		
Whig	John Heathcoat	Unopposed		
Registered electors		482		
Whig hold				
Whig hold				

General election 1859: Tiverton (2 seats)
Party	Candidate	Votes	%	±%
Liberal	Viscount Palmerston	Unopposed		
Liberal	George Denman	Unopposed		
Registered electors		506		
Liberal hold				
Liberal hold				

Palmerston became Prime Minister and First Lord of the Treasury, requiring a by-election.

By-election, 27 June 1859: Tiverton
Party	Candidate	Votes	%	±%
Liberal	Viscount Palmerston	Unopposed		
Liberal hold				

=== Elections in the 1860s ===
Temple was appointed Constable of Dover Castle and Lord Warden of the Cinque Ports, requiring a by-election.

By-election, 28 March 1861: Tiverton
Party	Candidate	Votes	%	±%
Liberal	Viscount Palmerston	Unopposed		
Liberal hold				

General election 1865: Tiverton (2 seats)
Party	Candidate	Votes	%	±%
Liberal	Viscount Palmerston	261	37.4	N/A
Conservative	John Walrond	220	31.5	New
Liberal	George Denman	217	31.1	N/A
Majority		3	0.4	N/A
Turnout		349 (est)	75.1 (est)	N/A
Registered electors		465		
Liberal hold		Swing	N/A	
Conservative gain from Liberal		Swing	N/A	

Lord Palmerston's death in October 1865 caused a by-election.

By-election, 28 February 1866: Tiverton (1 seat)
Party	Candidate	Votes	%	±%
Liberal	George Denman	232	55.5	−13.0
Conservative	John Dalrymple-Hay	186	44.5	+13.0
Majority		46	11.0	+10.6
Turnout		418	89.9	+14.8
Registered electors		465		
Liberal hold		Swing	−13.0	

General election 1868: Tiverton (2 seats)
Party	Candidate	Votes	%	±%
Liberal	George Denman	Unopposed		
Liberal	John Heathcoat-Amory	Unopposed		
Registered electors		1,155		
Liberal hold				
Liberal gain from Conservative				

=== Elections in the 1870s ===
Denman resigned after being appointed a Judge of Court of Common Pleas.

By-election, 6 Nov 1872: Tiverton (1 seat)
Party	Candidate	Votes	%	±%
Liberal	William Nathaniel Massey	577	51.3	N/A
Conservative	John Walrond	547	48.7	New
Majority		30	2.6	N/A
Turnout		1,124	89.3	N/A
Registered electors		1,258		
Liberal hold		Swing	N/A	

General election 1874: Tiverton (2 seats)
Party	Candidate	Votes	%	±%
Liberal	John Heathcoat-Amory	677	35.4	N/A
Liberal	William Nathaniel Massey	629	32.9	N/A
Conservative	John Walrond	605	31.7	N/A
Majority		24	1.2	N/A
Turnout		1,258 (est)	97.2 (est)	N/A
Registered electors		1,294		
Liberal hold		Swing	N/A	
Liberal hold		Swing	N/A	

=== Elections in the 1880s ===
General election 1880: Tiverton (2 seats)
Party	Candidate	Votes	%	±%
Liberal	John Heathcoat-Amory	743	36.6	+1.2
Liberal	William Nathaniel Massey	699	34.4	+1.5
Conservative	John Walrond	590	29.0	−2.7
Majority		109	5.4	+4.2
Turnout		1,229 (est)	93.1 (est)	−4.1
Registered electors		1,320		
Liberal hold		Swing	+1.3	
Liberal hold		Swing	+1.4	

Massey's death caused a by-election.

By-election, 15 Nov 1881: Tiverton (1 seat)
Party	Candidate	Votes	%	±%
Liberal	Viscount Ebrington	705	60.9	−10.1
Conservative	Robert Frederick Loosemore	453	39.1	+10.1
Majority		252	21.8	+16.4
Turnout		1,158	82.4	−10.7
Registered electors		1,405		
Liberal hold		Swing	−10.1	

Representation was reduced to one member.

General election 1885: Tiverton
Party	Candidate	Votes	%	±%
Conservative	William Walrond	4,563	56.9	+27.9
Liberal	Sydney Stern	3,460	43.1	−27.9
Majority		1,103	13.8	N/A
Turnout		8,023	85.8	−7.3 (est)
Registered electors		9,349		
Conservative gain from Liberal		Swing	+27.9	

General election 1886: Tiverton
Party	Candidate	Votes	%	±%
Conservative	William Walrond	Unopposed		
Conservative hold				

Walrond was appointed a Lord Commissioner of the Treasury, requiring a by-election.

By-election, 12 Aug 1886: Tiverton
Party	Candidate	Votes	%	±%
Conservative	William Walrond	Unopposed		
Conservative hold				

=== Elections in the 1890s ===
General election 1892: Tiverton
Party	Candidate	Votes	%	±%
Conservative	William Walrond	4,433	58.8	N/A
Liberal	John Budd Phear	3,101	41.2	New
Majority		1,332	17.6	N/A
Turnout		7,534	84.0	N/A
Registered electors		8,972		
Conservative hold		Swing	N/A	

General election 1895: Tiverton
Party	Candidate	Votes	%	±%
Conservative	William Walrond	Unopposed		
Conservative hold				

=== Elections in the 1900s ===
General election 1900: Tiverton
Party	Candidate	Votes	%	±%
Conservative	William Walrond	Unopposed		
Conservative hold				

By-election, 1902: Tiverton
Party	Candidate	Votes	%	±%
Conservative	William Walrond	Unopposed		
Conservative hold				

Reed

General election 1906: Tiverton
Party	Candidate	Votes	%	±%
Conservative	Lionel Walrond	4,455	52.9	N/A
Liberal	William Henry Reed	3,970	47.1	New
Majority		485	5.8	N/A
Turnout		8,425	91.1	N/A
Registered electors		9,248		
Conservative hold		Swing	N/A	

=== Elections in the 1910s ===
Walrond

General election January 1910: Tiverton
Party	Candidate	Votes	%	±%
Conservative	Lionel Walrond	4,945	54.4	+1.5
Liberal	Sir Ian Murray Heathcoat-Amory, 2nd Baronet	4,153	45.6	−1.5
Majority		792	8.8	+3.0
Turnout		9,098	94.2	+3.1
Registered electors		9,660		
Conservative hold		Swing	+1.5	

General election December 1910: Tiverton
Party	Candidate	Votes	%	±%
Conservative	Lionel Walrond	5,033	59.3	+4.9
Liberal	Alfred Trestrail	3,455	40.7	−4.9
Majority		1,578	18.6	+9.8
Turnout		8,488	87.9	−6.3
Registered electors		9,660		
Conservative hold		Swing	+4.9	

General Election 1914–15:

Another General Election was required to take place before the end of 1915. The political parties had been making preparations for an election to take place and by July 1914, the following candidates had been selected;

- Unionist: Lionel Walrond
- Liberal:

1915 Tiverton by-election
Party	Candidate	Votes	%	±%
Unionist	Charles Carew	Unopposed		
Unionist hold				

General election 1918: Tiverton
Party		Candidate	Votes	%	±%
C	Unionist	Charles Carew	9,598	57.2	−2.1
	Liberal	Edward Penton	4,827	28.7	−12.0
	Labour	Donald B. Fraser	2,377	14.1	New
Majority			4,771	28.5	+9.9
Turnout			16,802	64.8	−23.1
	Unionist hold		Swing	+5.0	
C indicates candidate endorsed by the coalition government.

=== Elections in the 1920s ===
Francis Acland

General election 1922: Tiverton
Party	Candidate	Votes	%	±%
Unionist	Herbert Sparkes	10,304	46.9	–10.3
Liberal	Francis Dyke Acland	10,230	46.5	+17.8
Labour	Frederick Brown	1,457	6.6	–7.5
Majority		74	0.4	–28.1
Turnout		21,991	80.1	+5.3
Unionist hold		Swing	–14.0	

1923 Tiverton by-election
Party	Candidate	Votes	%	±%
Liberal	Francis Dyke Acland	12,041	49.8	+3.3
Unionist	Gilbert Acland-Troyte	11,639	48.1	+1.2
Independent Labour	Frederick Brown	495	2.0	–4.6
Majority		402	1.7	N/A
Turnout		24,174	88.1	+8.0
Liberal gain from Conservative		Swing	+1.0	

8

General election 6 December 1923: Tiverton
Party	Candidate	Votes	%	±%
Liberal	Francis Dyke Acland	12,303	50.0	+3.5
Unionist	Gilbert Acland-Troyte	12,300	50.0	+3.1
Majority		3	0.0	N/A
Turnout		24,603	87.4	+7.3
Liberal gain from Conservative		Swing	+0.2	

General election 1924: Tiverton
Party	Candidate	Votes	%	±%
Unionist	Gilbert Acland-Troyte	13,601	53.2	+3.2
Liberal	Francis Dyke Acland	11,942	46.8	–3.2
Majority		1,659	6.4	N/A
Turnout		25,543	90.2	+2.8
Unionist gain from Liberal		Swing	+3.2	

General election 1929: Tiverton
Party	Candidate	Votes	%	±%
Unionist	Gilbert Acland-Troyte	15,423	50.5	–2.7
Liberal	Dingle Foot	12,908	42.3	–4.5
Labour	Heyman Wreford Wreford-Glanville	2,199	7.2	New
Majority		2,515	8.2	+1.8
Turnout		30,530	86.2	–4.0
Unionist hold		Swing	+0.9	

=== Elections in the 1930s ===
General election 1931: Tiverton
Party	Candidate	Votes	%	±%
Conservative	Gilbert Acland-Troyte	Unopposed	N/A	N/A
Conservative hold				

General election 1935: Tiverton
Party	Candidate	Votes	%	±%
Conservative	Gilbert Acland-Troyte	Unopposed	N/A	N/A
Conservative hold				

=== Elections in the 1940s ===
General Election 1939–40: Another General Election was required to take place before the end of 1940. The political parties had been making preparations for an election to take place from 1939 and by the end of this year, the following candidates had been selected;

- Conservative: Gilbert Acland-Troyte
- Independent Progressive: Michael Pinney

General election 1945: Tiverton
Party	Candidate	Votes	%	±%
Conservative	Derick Heathcoat-Amory	16,919	51.3	N/A
Labour	GC Tompson	8,634	26.2	New
Liberal	Cyril Harry Blackburn	7,418	22.5	New
Majority		8,285	25.1	N/A
Turnout		32,971	74.0	N/A
Conservative hold		Swing	N/A	

=== Elections in the 1950s ===
General election 1950: Tiverton
Party	Candidate	Votes	%	±%
Conservative	Derick Heathcoat-Amory	20,606	52.11	
Labour	Patrick Duffy	12,055	30.48	
Liberal	Cyril Harry Blackburn	6,885	17.41	
Majority		8,551	21.63	
Turnout		46,536	84.98	
Conservative hold		Swing		

General election 1951: Tiverton
Party	Candidate	Votes	%	±%
Conservative	Derick Heathcoat-Amory	24,532	63.53	
Labour	Patrick Duffy	14,084	36.47	
Majority		10,448	27.06	
Turnout		38,616	81.26	
Conservative hold		Swing		

General election 1955: Tiverton
Party	Candidate	Votes	%	±%
Conservative	Derick Heathcoat-Amory	23,475	64.27	
Labour	Patrick Duffy	13,051	35.73	
Majority		10,424	28.54	
Turnout		36,526	76.32	
Conservative hold		Swing		

General election 1959: Tiverton
Party	Candidate	Votes	%	±%
Conservative	Derick Heathcoat-Amory	21,714	55.6	−8.7
Labour	John Dunwoody	9,836	25.2	−10.5
Liberal	James J Collier	7,504	19.2	New
Majority		11,878	30.4	+1.9
Turnout		39,054	80.7	+4.4
Conservative hold		Swing		

=== Elections in the 1960s ===
1960 Tiverton by-election
Party	Candidate	Votes	%	±%
Conservative	Robin Maxwell-Hyslop	15,308	45.7	−9.9
Liberal	James J Collier	12,268	36.7	+17.5
Labour	Raymond F H Dobson	5,895	17.6	−7.6
Majority		3,040	9.0	−21.4
Turnout		33,471	68.4	−12.3
Conservative hold		Swing		

General election 1964: Tiverton
Party	Candidate	Votes	%	±%
Conservative	Robin Maxwell-Hyslop	19,280	47.3	−8.3
Liberal	James J Collier	14,053	34.5	+15.3
Labour	John T Mitchard	7,393	18.2	−7.0
Majority		5,227	12.8	−17.6
Turnout		40,726	80.1	−0.6
Conservative hold		Swing		

General election 1966: Tiverton
Party	Candidate	Votes	%	±%
Conservative	Robin Maxwell-Hyslop	20,351	48.57	
Labour	F Keith Taylor	11,325	27.03	
Liberal	Frank J Suter	10,225	24.40	
Majority		9,026	21.54	
Turnout		41,901	80.72	
Conservative hold		Swing		

=== Elections in the 1970s ===
General election 1970: Tiverton
Party	Candidate	Votes	%	±%
Conservative	Robin Maxwell-Hyslop	24,689	55.18	
Labour	Roy Hewetson	10,823	24.19	
Liberal	Frank J Suter	9,229	20.63	
Majority		13,866	30.99	
Turnout		44,741	77.01	
Conservative hold		Swing		

General election February 1974: Tiverton
Party	Candidate	Votes	%	±%
Conservative	Robin Maxwell-Hyslop	27,164	47.58	
Liberal	Frank J Suter	21,623	37.87	
Labour	Roy Hewetson	8,308	14.55	
Majority		5,541	9.69	
Turnout		57,095	82.36	
Conservative hold		Swing		

General election October 1974: Tiverton
Party	Candidate	Votes	%	±%
Conservative	Robin Maxwell-Hyslop	25,265	46.68	
Liberal	Frank J Suter	19,911	36.79	
Labour	M Phillips	8,946	16.53	
Majority		5,354	9.89	
Turnout		54,122	77.45	
Conservative hold		Swing		

General election 1979: Tiverton
Party	Candidate	Votes	%	±%
Conservative	Robin Maxwell-Hyslop	33,444	56.74	
Liberal	David J Morrish	17,215	29.21	
Labour	AWF Cook	8,281	14.05	
Majority		16,229	27.53	
Turnout		58,940	79.25	
Conservative hold		Swing		

=== Elections in the 1980s ===
General election 1983: Tiverton
Party	Candidate	Votes	%	±%
Conservative	Robin Maxwell-Hyslop	27,101	54.78	
Liberal	David J Morrish	19,215	38.84	
Labour	David A Gorbutt	3,154	6.38	
Majority		7,886	15.94	
Turnout		49,470	77.51	
Conservative hold		Swing		

General election 1987: Tiverton
Party	Candidate	Votes	%	±%
Conservative	Robin Maxwell-Hyslop	29,875	54.95	
Liberal	David Morrish	20,663	38.00	
Labour	Jean Northam	3,400	6.25	
Independent	William Jones	434	0.80	New
Majority		9,212	16.95	
Turnout		54,372	79.71	
Conservative hold		Swing		

=== Elections in the 1990s ===
General election 1992: Tiverton
Party	Candidate	Votes	%	±%
Conservative	Angela Browning	30,376	51.5	―3.4
Liberal Democrats	David N Cox	19,287	32.7	―5.3
Labour	SC Gibb	5,950	10.1	+3.9
Liberal	David J Morrish	2,225	3.8	New
Green	Peter Foggitt	1,007	1.7	New
Natural Law	BC Rhodes	96	0.2	New
Majority		11,089	18.8	+1.9
Turnout		58,941	83.3	+3.6
Conservative hold		Swing	+0.9	

== See also ==
- List of parliamentary constituencies in Devon

== Sources ==
- Robert Beatson, A Chronological Register of Both Houses of Parliament (London: Longman, Hurst, Res & Orme, 1807)
- D Brunton & D H Pennington, Members of the Long Parliament (London: George Allen & Unwin, 1954)
- Cobbett's Parliamentary history of England, from the Norman Conquest in 1066 to the year 1803 (London: Thomas Hansard, 1808)
- F W S Craig, British Parliamentary Election Results 1832-1885 (2nd edition, Aldershot: Parliamentary Research Services, 1989)
- Henry Stooks Smith, The Parliaments of England from 1715 to 1847, Volume 1 (London: Simpkin, Marshall & Co, 1844)
- Willis, Browne (1750). Notitia Parliamentaria, Part II: A Series or Lists of the Representatives in the several Parliaments held from the Reformation 1541, to the Restoration 1660 ... London. p. 1.

Parliament of the United Kingdom
Vacant since 1852 Title last held by City of London	Constituency represented by the prime minister 1855–1858	Vacant until 1859 Title next held by Tiverton
Vacant since 1858 Title last held by Tiverton	Constituency represented by the prime minister 1859–1865	Vacant until 1868 Title next held by Buckinghamshire
Preceded by Monmouth	Constituency represented by the chancellor of the Exchequer; 1958–1960	Succeeded by Wirral
