= 1915 Tiverton by-election =

UK Parliamentary by-election

Tiverton in Devon, 1915

The 1915 Tiverton by-election was held on 30 November 1915. The by-election was held due to the death of the incumbent Conservative MP, Hon. William Walrond. It was won by the Conservative candidate Charles Carew who was unopposed due to a War-time electoral pact.
