= Sir John Heathcoat-Amory, 1st Baronet =

British businessman and politician (1829–1914)

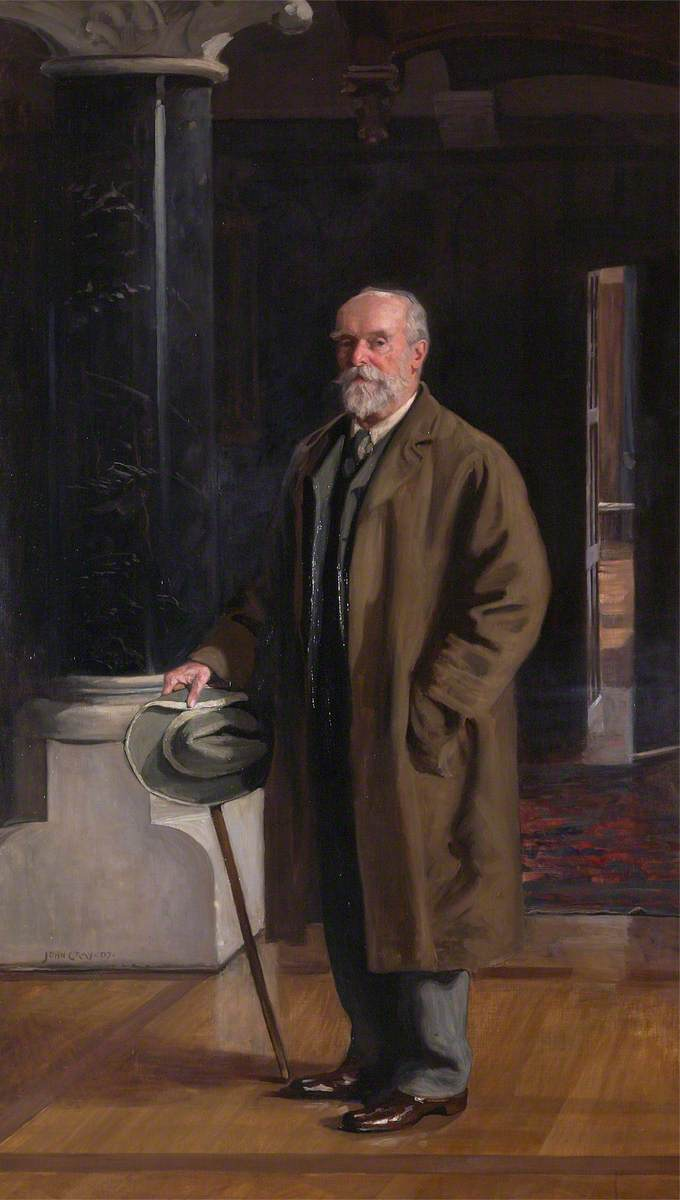
Portrait by John Gray, 1907

Sir John Heathcoat Heathcoat-Amory, 1st Baronet, DL (4 May 1829 – 26 May 1914), was a British businessman and Liberal politician.

Born John Amory, he was the maternal grandson of John Heathcoat, Member of Parliament for Tiverton, and assumed the additional surname of Heathcoat by Royal licence. He was a partner of J. Heathcoat & Co, lace manufacturers, and also represented Tiverton in the House of Commons between 1868 and 1885. In 1874 he was created a baronet, of Knightshayes Court in Tiverton in the County of Devon. In 1867 he commissioned the country house of Knightshayes Court under the design of William Burges.

Heathcoat-Amory married Henrietta Mary Unwin in 1863. They had nine children (five sons and four daughters), of whom six reached adulthood. Derick Heathcoat-Amory, 1st Viscount Amory, was their grandson while David Heathcoat-Amory is their great-grandson. Heathcoat-Amory died in May 1914, aged 85, and was succeeded in the baronetcy by his second but eldest surviving son Ian. Lady Heathcoat-Amory died in November 1923.

Parliament of the United Kingdom
Preceded by John Walrond; George Denman	Member of Parliament for Tiverton; 1868 – 1885; With: George Denman 1868–1872; William Nathaniel Massey 1872–1881; Viscount Ebrington 1881–1885	Succeeded by William Walrond (representation reduced to one member 1885)
Baronetage of the United Kingdom
New creation	Baronet (of Knightshayes); 1874–1914	Succeeded by Ian Murray Heathcoat-Amory
