= George Denman =

English barrister, High Court judge and Liberal politician

The Right Honourable George Denman
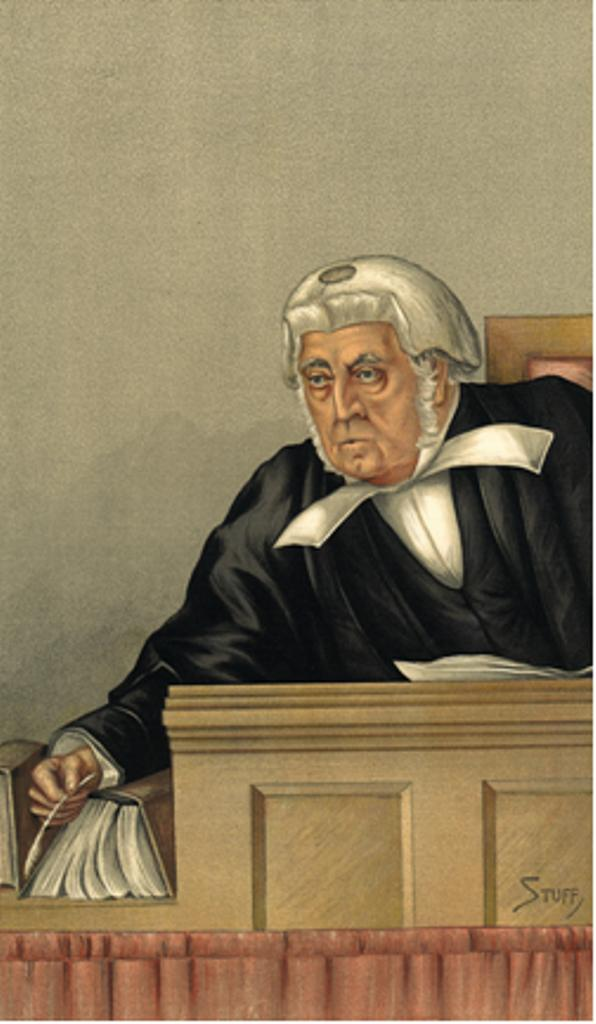

George Denman (23 December 1819 – 21 September 1896) was an English barrister, High Court judge, and Liberal politician.

== Early life ==
Denman was born at 50 Russell Square, London, the fourth son of Thomas Denman, 1st Baron Denman, of Dovedale, and his wife Theodosia Anne Vevers. He was educated at Repton School and at Trinity College, Cambridge, where he was a pupil of Joseph Blakesley. Denman became a Fellow of Trinity College. A student at Lincoln's Inn from November 1843, he read in the chambers of Peter Bellinger Brodie. In November 1844 he became a pupil of Barnes Peacock, and was called to the Bar in November 1846.

== Legal career ==
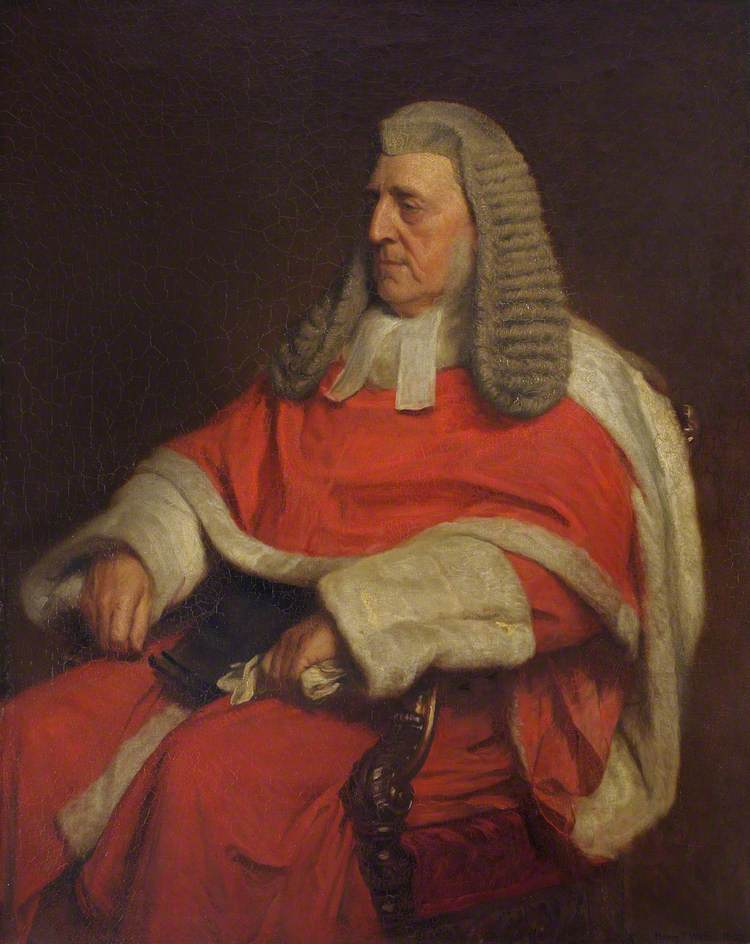
George Denman, 1893 portrait

Denman was appointed Cambridge University counsel in 1857. He became a Queen's Counsel (QC) in 1861. In 1872 he was appointed Justice of the Court of Common Pleas and resigned his seat in the House of Commons. In 1875, he was appointed a Judge of the High Court, turning down the customary knighthood because he was the son of a peer.

In 1878, he sentenced Selina Wadge to death in Cornwall for the murder of her son. He retired as a judge in 1892 and in 1893 was invested as a Privy Counsellor.

It was said of Denman that "He looked a model Judge. But he was never quite so good a Judge as he looked."

== In politics ==
In 1856, Denman stood for Parliament unsuccessfully for Cambridge University. He was elected Member of Parliament for Tiverton at the 1859 general election and held the seat until 1865. In 1866, he was re-elected MP for Tiverton.

Denman was known as a criminal law reformer. He gave evidence, however, to the Royal Commission on Capital Punishment 1864–66, supporting the retention of public executions. In parliament he interested himself in the reform of the law of evidence in criminal trials, and on 20 June 1860 moved the second reading of the Felony and Misdemeanor Bill, which aimed to assimilate proceedings for a criminal trial to those current in civil trials (at nisi prius). The bill passed the Commons, but was abandoned after alteration in the Lords. Five years later, 22 February 1865, he successfully carried through a similar measure, the Felony and Misdemeanor Evidence and Practice Bill. The Evidence Further Amendment Act 1869 (32 & 33 Vict. c. 68), popularly known as Denman's Act, was his personal initiative. It meant that witnesses professing no religious belief were able to affirm in courts of justice, and parties previously incompetent were able to give evidence.

== Death and legacy ==
Denman died at Cranley Gardens, London, S.W., on 21 September 1896, and was buried in the churchyard at Willian, near Hitchin. A brass with an inscription by John Edwin Sandys was placed in the chapel of Repton School to his memory, and a memorial scholarship founded at the school by public subscription.

== Works ==
Denman translated Gray's Elegy into Greek and dedicated the work in 1871 to Sir Alexander Cockburn, the Lord Chief Justice. He also translated Alexander Pope's Iliad into Latin and in 1873 dedicated it to W. E. Gladstone, the Prime Minister.

== Oarsman ==
At Cambridge Denman was an energetic rower and in 1840 rowed for Trinity in the Grand Challenge Cup at Henley Royal Regatta. In 1841 he rowed for Cambridge in the Boat Race. Four days before the event he was injured in a collision on the river in a training outing with his brother. He was leeched by the junior footman and recovered sufficiently that Cambridge won the race. He was also bow in the Cambridge Subscription Rooms crew that won the Grand Challenge Cup that year. In 1842, he won the Colquhoun Sculls, stroked his college boat to the head of the Cam, and rowed for Cambridge again in the Boat Race and in the Grand at Henley. In 1843 he rowed for Trinity again in the Grand in a crew down to seven oarsmen because the stroke went ill and substitutions were not permitted. Trinity lost to a full Oxford University eight that won by two lengths.

In 1881 Denman provided an English translation of Herbert Kynaston's Latin hexameters written for the fiftieth anniversary of the Boat Race. It was published in his book, Intervalla, published in 1898; pages 67–77

== Family ==
Denman married Charlotte Hope, daughter of Samuel Hope, on 19 February 1852.

Children of Rt. Hon. George Denman and Charlotte Hope:

Charlotte Edith Denman d. 29 Dec 1884; Grace Denman d. 16 Apr 1935; George Lewis Denman b. 5 May 1854, d. 26 May 1929; Sir Arthur Denman b. 1 May 1857, d. 15 Dec 1931; Commander Launcelot Baillie Denman b. 15 Jan 1861, d. 29 Aug 1935; Francis Richard Amory Denman b. 5 Dec 1862, d. 5 May 1900.

Denman's brother Joseph Denman was an admiral. A daughter, Edith, was the first wife of Rev. William Henry Draper, who wrote the English translation of All Creatures of Our God and King.

== See also ==
- List of Cambridge University Boat Race crews

Parliament of the United Kingdom
Preceded by John Heathcoat; Lord Palmeston	Member of Parliament for Tiverton; 1859–1865; With: Lord Palmeston	Succeeded by John Walrond; Lord Palmeston
Preceded by Lord Palmeston; John Walrond	Member of Parliament for Tiverton; 1866–1872; With: John Walrond 1866–1868; John Heathcoat-Amory 1868–1872	Succeeded by William Nathaniel Massey; John Heathcoat-Amory
