= William Walrond, 1st Baron Waleran =

British politician

The Right Honourable The Lord Waleran PC DL JP
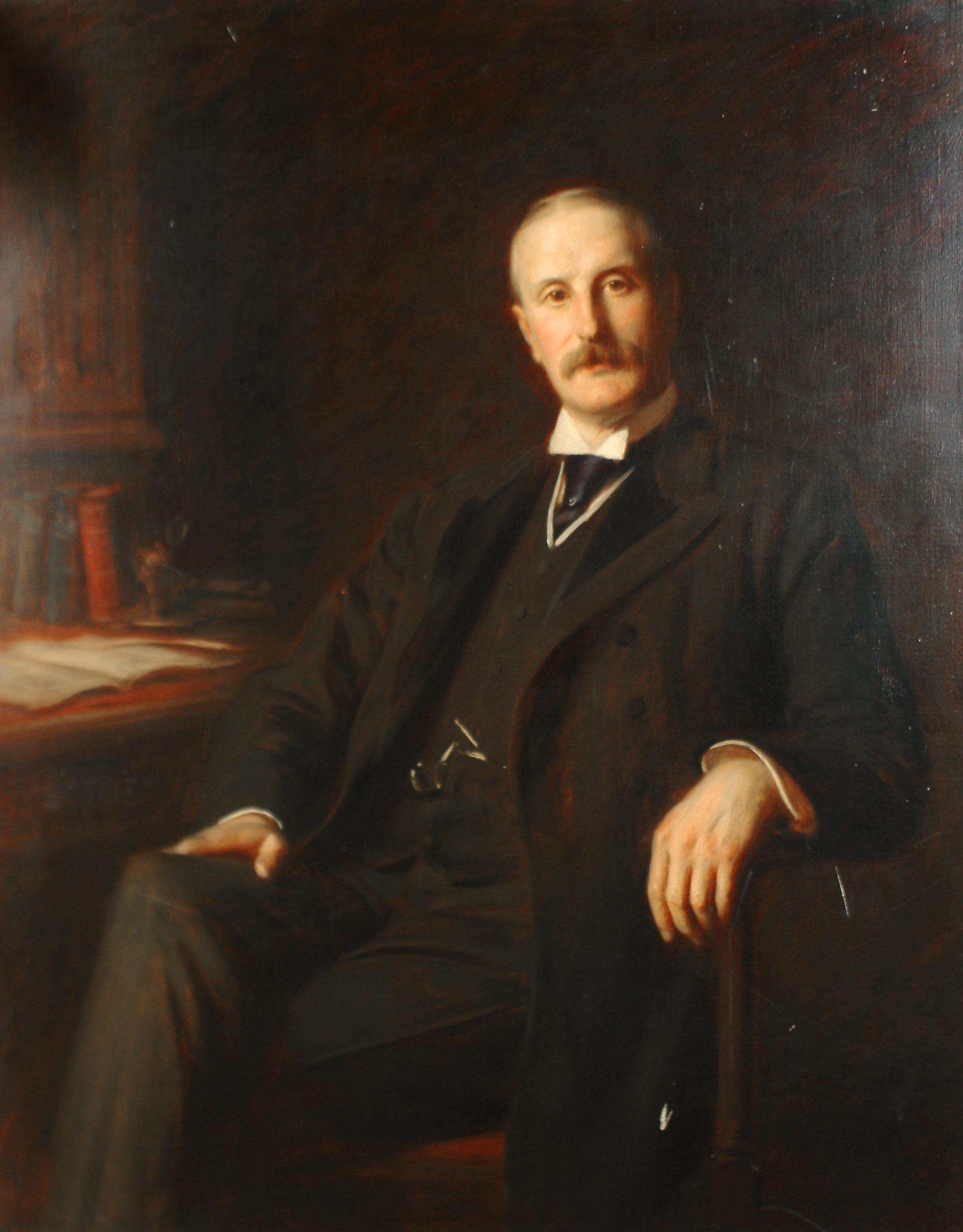
- William Walrond, 1st Baron Waleran, as painted by Sir Hubert von Herkomer.

Parliamentary Secretary to the Treasury
- In office 29 June 1895 – 8 August 1902
- Monarchs: Victoria; Edward VII
- Prime Minister: The Marquess of Salisbury; Arthur Balfour
- Preceded by: T. E. Ellis
- Succeeded by: Sir Alexander Fuller-Acland-Hood, Bt

Chancellor of the Duchy of Lancaster
- In office 11 August 1902 – 4 December 1905
- Monarch: Edward VII
- Prime Minister: Arthur Balfour
- Preceded by: The Lord James of Hereford
- Succeeded by: Henry Fowler

Personal details
- Born: 26 February 1849
- Died: 17 May 1925 (aged 76)
- Party: Conservative
- Spouse(s): (1) Elizabeth Pitman (2) Helene Morrison

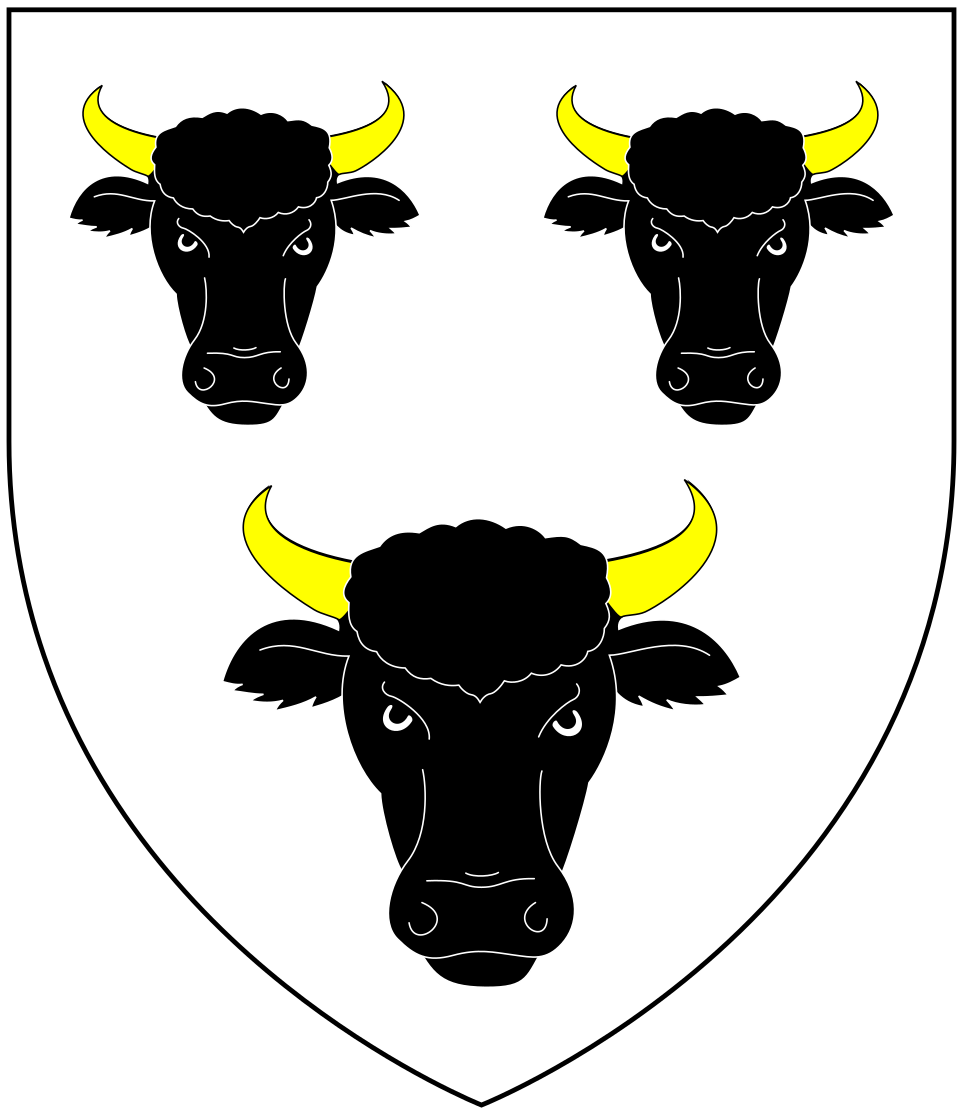
Arms of Walrond of Bradfield, Devon: Argent, three bull's heads cabossed sable armed or; Crest: A heraldic tiger sable pellete

William Hood Walrond, 1st Baron Waleran, PC, DL, JP (26 February 1849 – 17 May 1925), known as Sir William Walrond, Bt, between 1889 and 1905, of Bradfield House, Uffculme, Devon, was a British Conservative Party politician who sat in the House of Commons from 1880 until 1906 when he was raised to the peerage. He served as Parliamentary Secretary to the Treasury between 1895 and 1902 and as Chancellor of the Duchy of Lancaster between 1902 and 1905.

== Background ==
Walrond was the son of Sir John Walrond, 1st Baronet of Bradfield House, Uffculme, Devon and the Hon. Frances Caroline Hood, youngest daughter of Samuel Hood, 2nd Baron Bridport. He was educated at Eton and served as a captain in the Grenadier Guards in 1872. He was Lieutenant-Colonel commanding the 1st (Exeter and South Devon) Devonshire Rifle Volunteer Corps from 9 June 1877, and a J.P. and DL for Devon.

== Cricket ==
Walrond was also an active cricketer. He was in the Eton first XI in 1866 and 1867 and played for numerous amateur teams for many years subsequently including Quidnuncs, I Zingari, Gentlemen of Devon and Marylebone Cricket Club. He played one game for MCC in 1868 which was classified as first-class.

== Political career ==
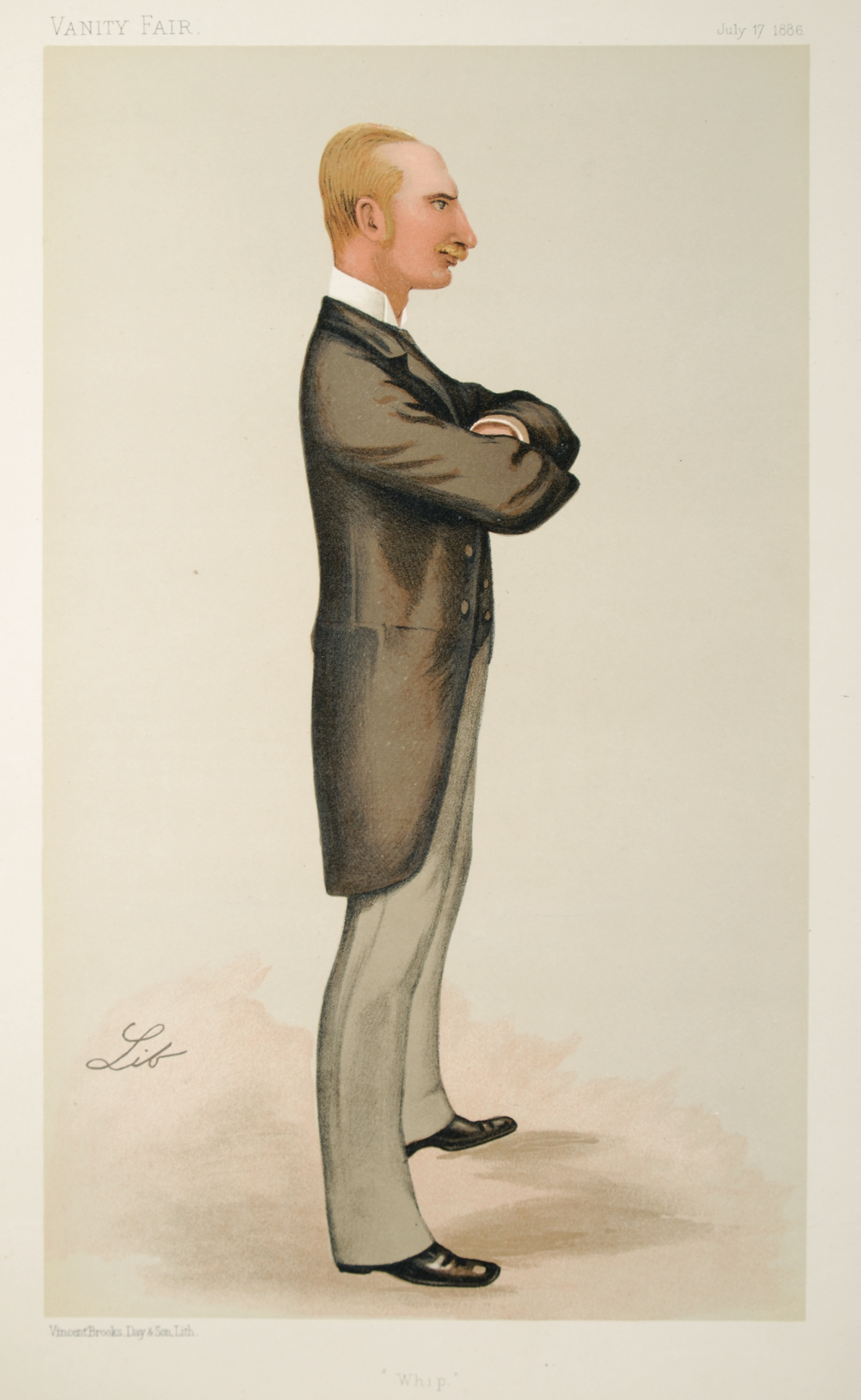
Walrond caricatured by Lib in Vanity Fair, 1886

Walrond was elected as a Member of Parliament (MP) for East Devonshire in the 1880 general election and held the seat until 1885 when it was replaced under the Redistribution of Seats Act 1885. In the 1885 general election he was elected MP for Tiverton which he held until 1906. Walrond served as a Junior Lord of the Treasury from 1885 to 1886 under Lord Salisbury, and from 1886 to 1892 under Salisbury and then under Arthur Balfour. He was Parliamentary Secretary to the Treasury and Chief Whip under Balfour from 1895 to 1902 and Chancellor of the Duchy of Lancaster from 11 August 1902 to 1905. He was sworn of the Privy Council in 1899.

In 1889 he succeeded his father in the baronetcy and in 1905 he was raised to the peerage as Baron Waleran, of Uffculme in the County of Devon.

== Family ==
Walrond's sister, Mary Caroline Walrond, married firstly Lt.-Col. Sir George Clay, 3rd Bt., and secondly Lt.-Col. Walter Henry Holbech. Her son from her second marriage was William Holbech, who, like his uncle, played first-class cricket.

Walrond married twice, first in 1871 Elizabeth Katharine Pitman; after her death in October 1911 he married secondly in 1913 Helene Margaret Morrison, daughter of F. Morrison. There were children by the first marriage:

- Hon. Evelyn Maud Walrond, OBE (1872–1944); married at Bradfield, Collumpton, Devon on 27 August 1901 George Russell Northcote, a descendant of the Earls of Iddesleigh.
- John Neville Hood Walrond (26 Nov 1874 – 30 Dec 1902), who died unmarried at Sanremo 28 years old in 1902.
- Hon. William Lionel Charles Walrond (1876–1915), succeeded his father as Member of Parliament for Tiverton but was killed in action in the First World War. His son succeeded to the title.
- Hon. Dorothy Katherine Walrond (d.1952); married in 1897 Arthur Robert Pyers Southwell, 5th Viscount Southwell (1872–1944), and left children including later Viscounts Southwell.

Lord Waleran died in May 1925, aged 76, and was succeeded in his titles by his grandson, William. Lady Waleran died in February 1956.

Parliament of the United Kingdom
| Preceded by Sir Lawrence Palk, Bt; Sir John Henry Kennaway, Bt | Member of Parliament for Devon East; 1880 – 1885; With: Sir John Henry Kennaway, Bt | Constituency abolished |
| Preceded by Sir John Heathcoat-Amory, Bt; Viscount Ebrington | Member of Parliament for Tiverton; 1885 – 1906 | Succeeded by Hon. William Walrond |
Political offices
| Preceded by Thomas Edward Ellis | Parliamentary Secretary to the Treasury; 1895 – 1902 | Succeeded by Sir Alexander Acland-Hood, Bt |
| Preceded by The Lord James of Hereford | Chancellor of the Duchy of Lancaster; 1902 – 1905 | Succeeded by Henry Fowler |
Baronetage of the United Kingdom
| Preceded by John Walrond | Baronet (of Bradfield); 1899–1925 | Succeeded by William George Hood Walrond |
Peerage of the United Kingdom
| New creation | Baron Waleran; 1905 – 1925 | Succeeded by William George Hood Walrond |
