= William Walrond (politician) =

British politician

Lionel Walrond in 1906

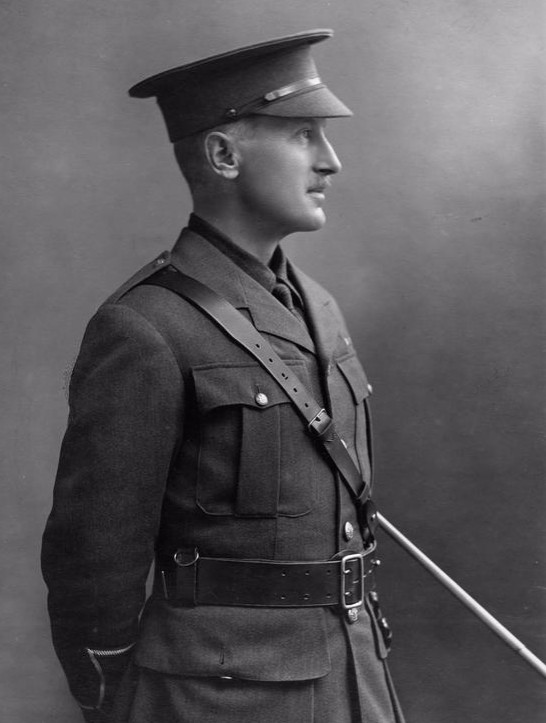
Walrond in military uniform during the First World War

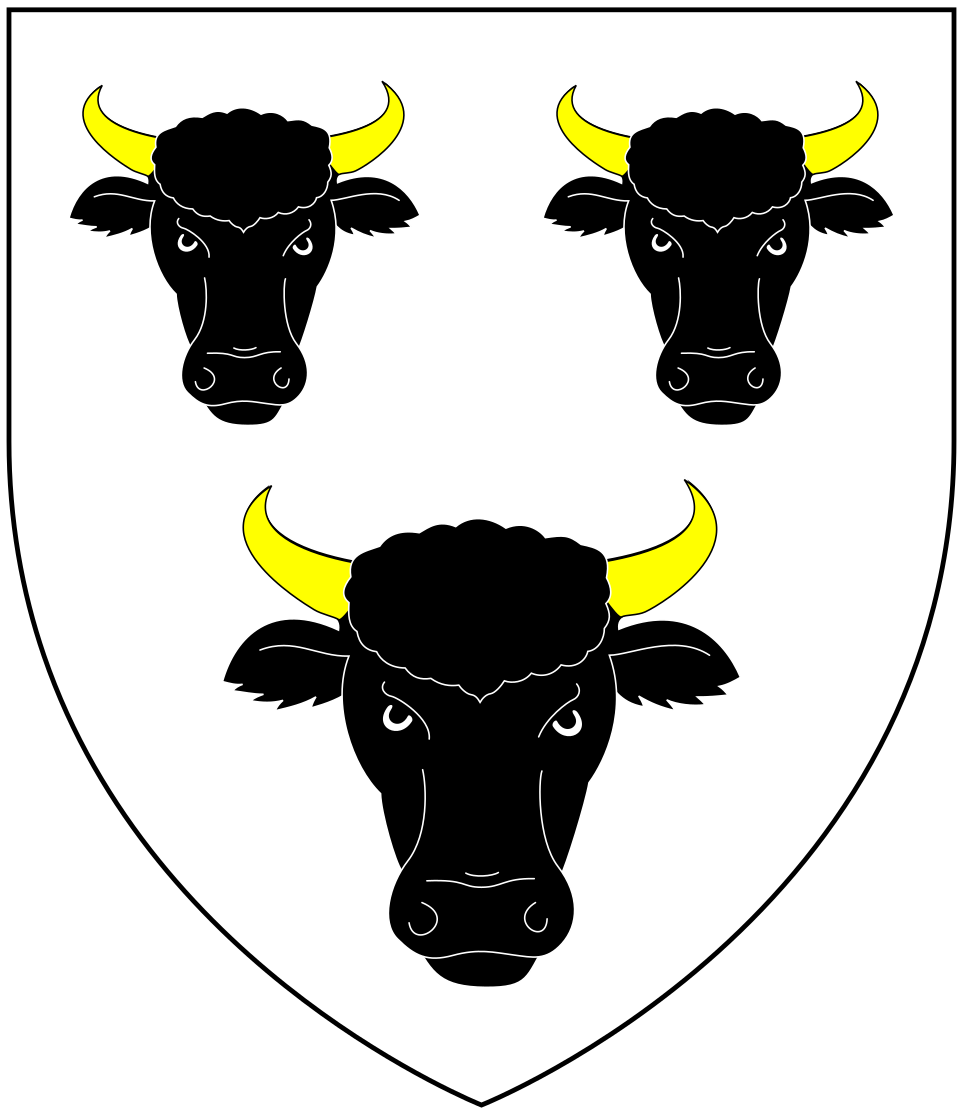
Arms of Walrond of Bradfield, Devon: Argent, three bull's heads cabossed sable armed or; Crest: A heraldic tiger sable pellete

The Honourable William Lionel Charles Walrond (22 May 1876 – 2 November 1915) was a British Conservative politician. Did not die from wounds, but from illness while on sick leave in the UK.

== Life ==
Walrond was the second but eldest surviving son of William Walrond, 1st Baron Waleran, by Elizabeth Katharine Pitman, daughter of James Samuel Pitman, of Dunchideock House, Devon, High Sheriff of Devon in 1856.

In August 1902 he was appointed First secretary to Sir Alexander Acland-Hood, Parliamentary Secretary to the Treasury. He succeeded his father as Member of Parliament (MP) for Tiverton in 1906, as seat he held until his death in 1915. He served as Secretary to the First Lord of the Treasury.

Walrond married Charlotte Margaret Lothian Coats, daughter of George Coats, later Baron Glentanar, in 1904. They had two sons, one of whom William Walrond eventually succeeded in the barony of Waleran.

He died, aged 39, of wounds received in action on 2 November 1915 while serving as a lieutenant with the Royal Army Service Corps during the First World War. He is buried in the churchyard at All Saints' Chapel, Bradfield, the chapel to Bradfield House, at the time the seat of the Walrond family. Walrond is commemorated on Panel 8 of the Parliamentary War Memorial in Westminster Hall, one of 22 MPs that died during World War I to be named on that memorial. Walrond is one of 19 MPs who fell in the war who are commemorated by heraldic shields in the Commons Chamber. A further act of commemoration came with the unveiling in 1932 of a manuscript-style illuminated book of remembrance for the House of Commons, which includes a short biographical account of the life and death of Walrond.

Parliament of the United Kingdom
Preceded by Sir William Walrond	Member of Parliament for Tiverton; 1906 – 1915	Succeeded by Charles Carew
