= List of MPs elected to the English Parliament in 1660 =

This is a list of members of Parliament (MPs) in the Convention Parliament which began at Westminster on 25 April 1660, and was held until 29 December 1660. It was elected as a "free parliament", i.e. with no oath of allegiance to the Commonwealth or to the monarchy. The last parliament called by Royal Authority was originally the Long Parliament called on 3 November 1640, but subsequently reduced to the Rump parliament under Pride's Purge. There were four intervening parliaments called under the Commonwealth. The restored Rump Parliament had finally voted for its own dissolution on 16 March and summoned the new Convention Parliament.

The Convention Parliament was predominantly Royalist in its membership and called back the King, and restored the Constitution in Church and State. After the Declaration of Breda had been received, Parliament proclaimed on 8 May that King Charles II had been the lawful monarch since the death of Charles I in January 1649. The Convention Parliament then proceeded to conduct the necessary preparation for the Restoration Settlement.

== List of constituencies and members ==
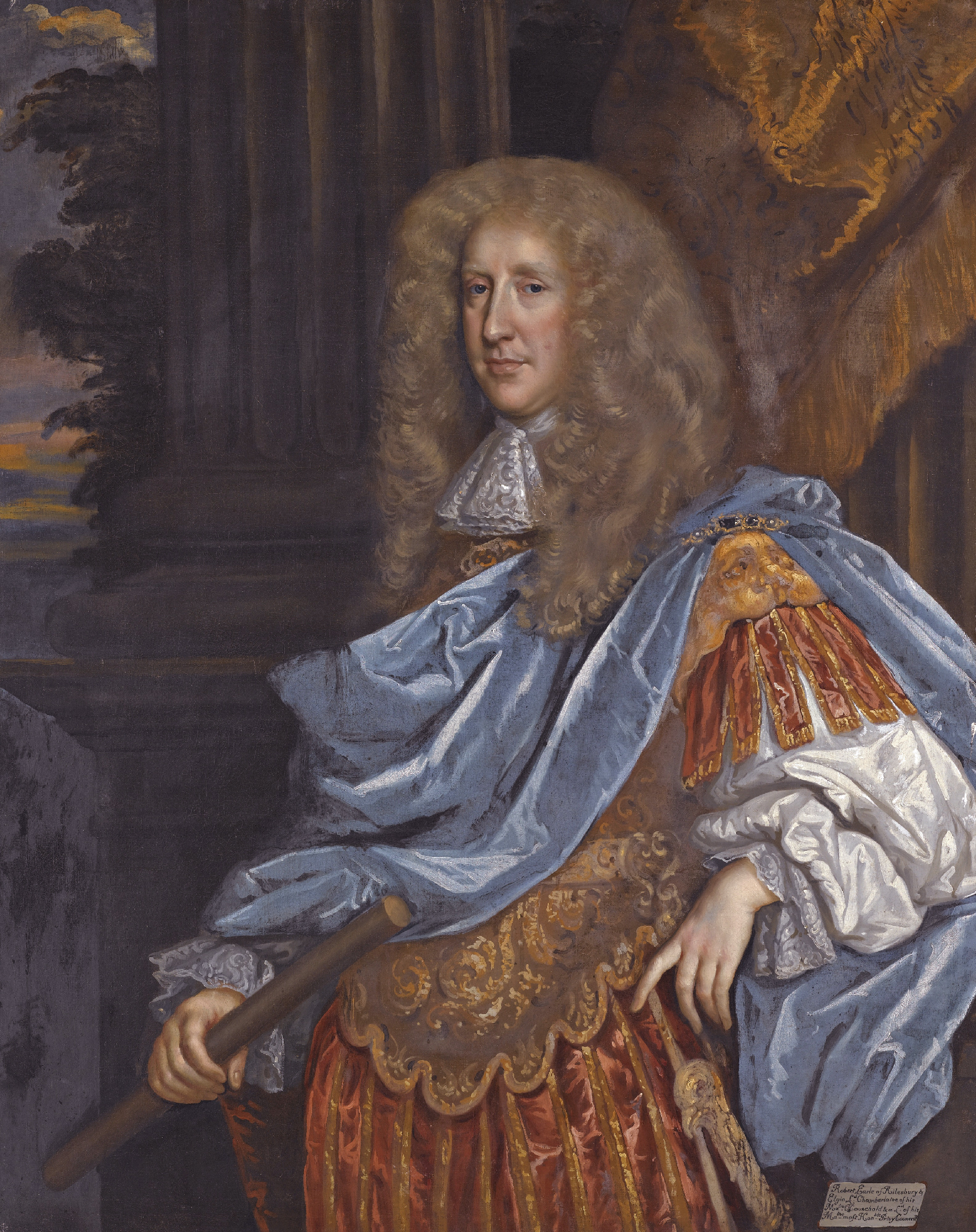
Robert Bruce, Lord Bruce, Bedfordshire

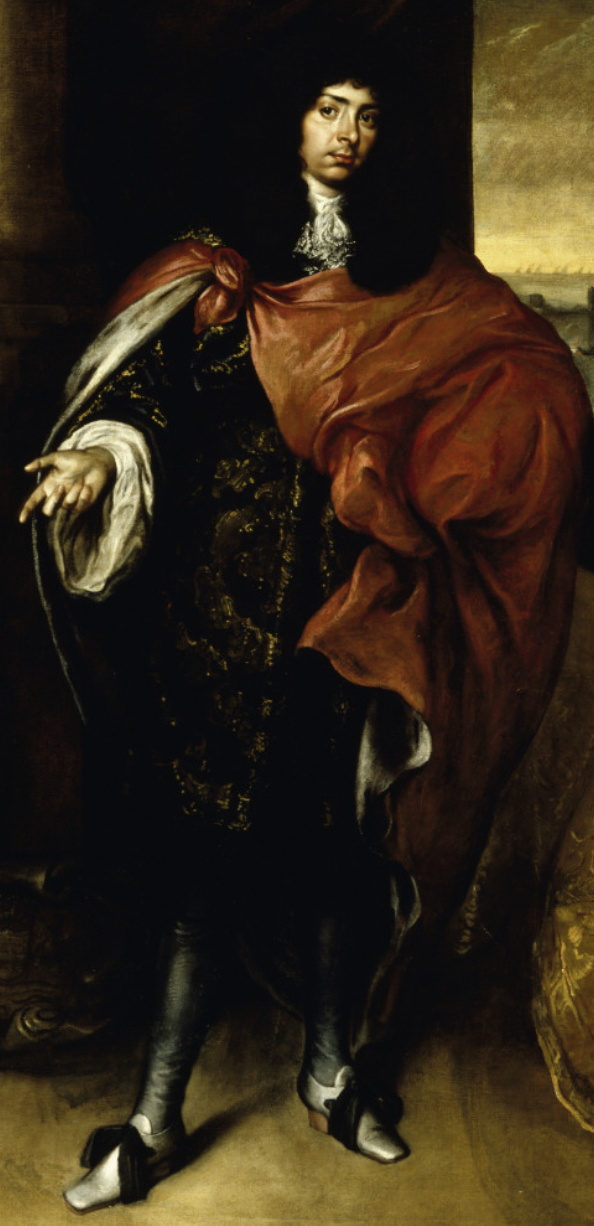
Roger Palmer, Windsor

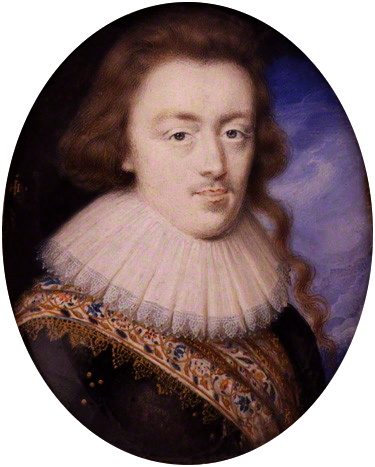
Dudley North, Cambridge

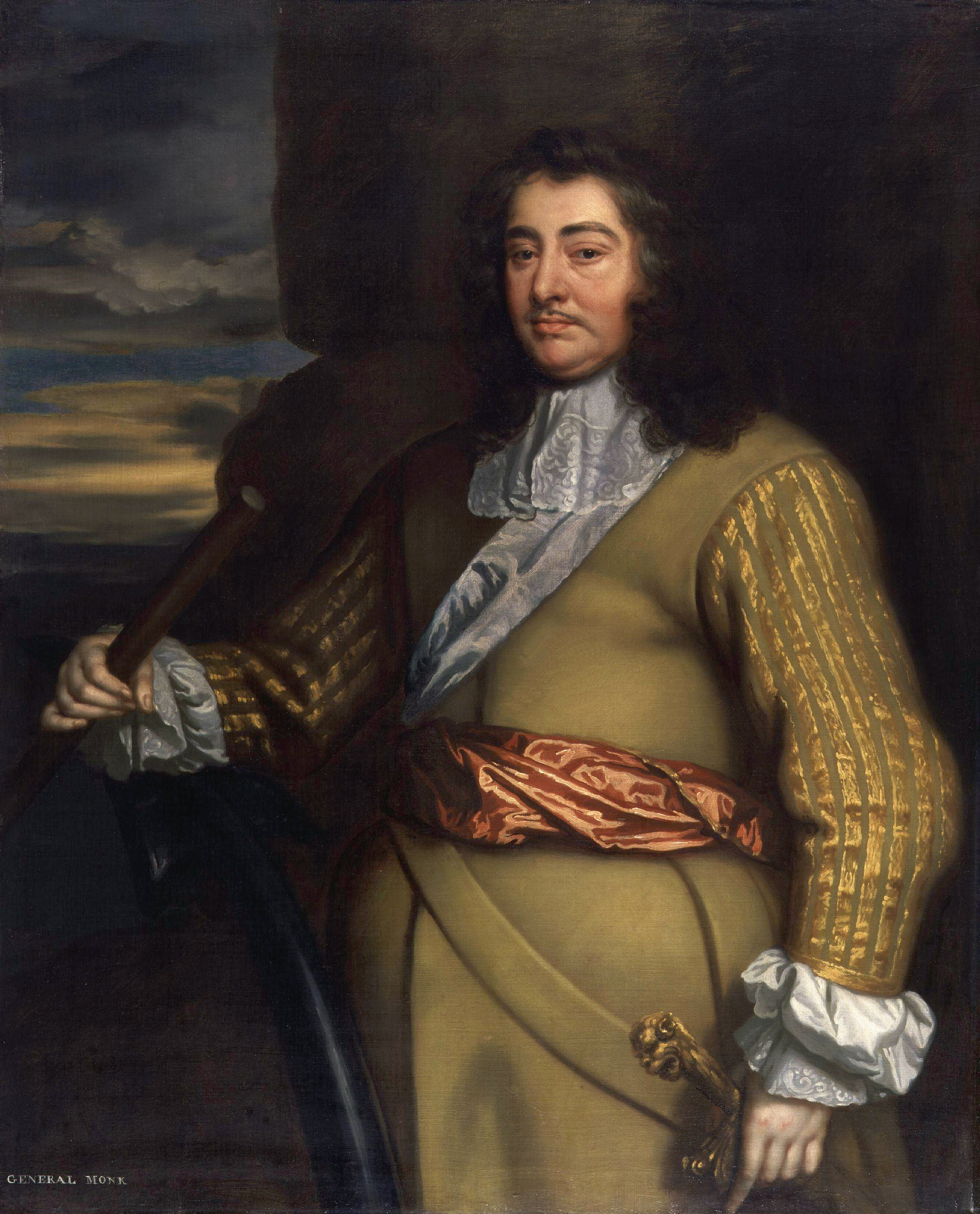
George Monck Cambridge and Devon

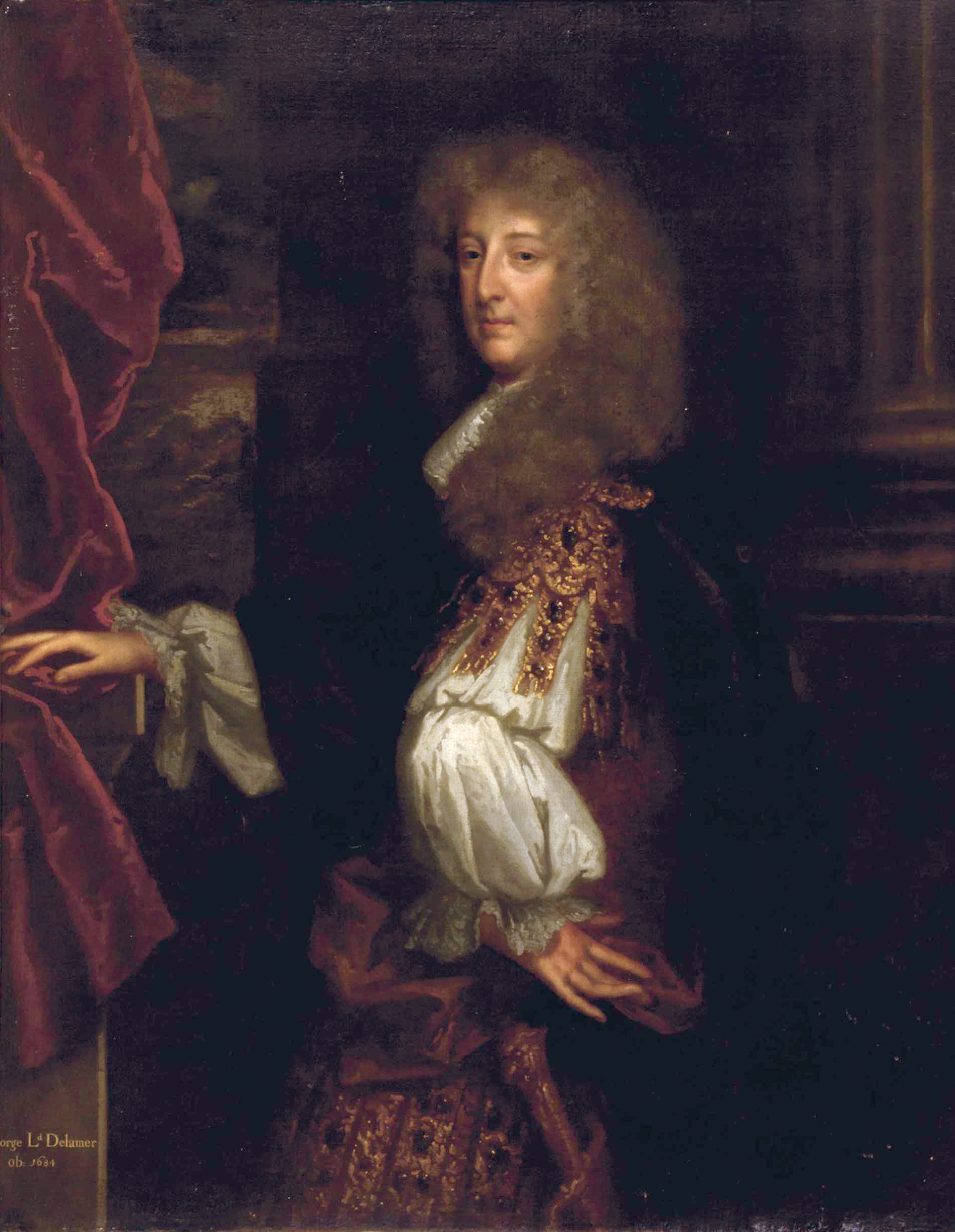
George Booth, Cheshire

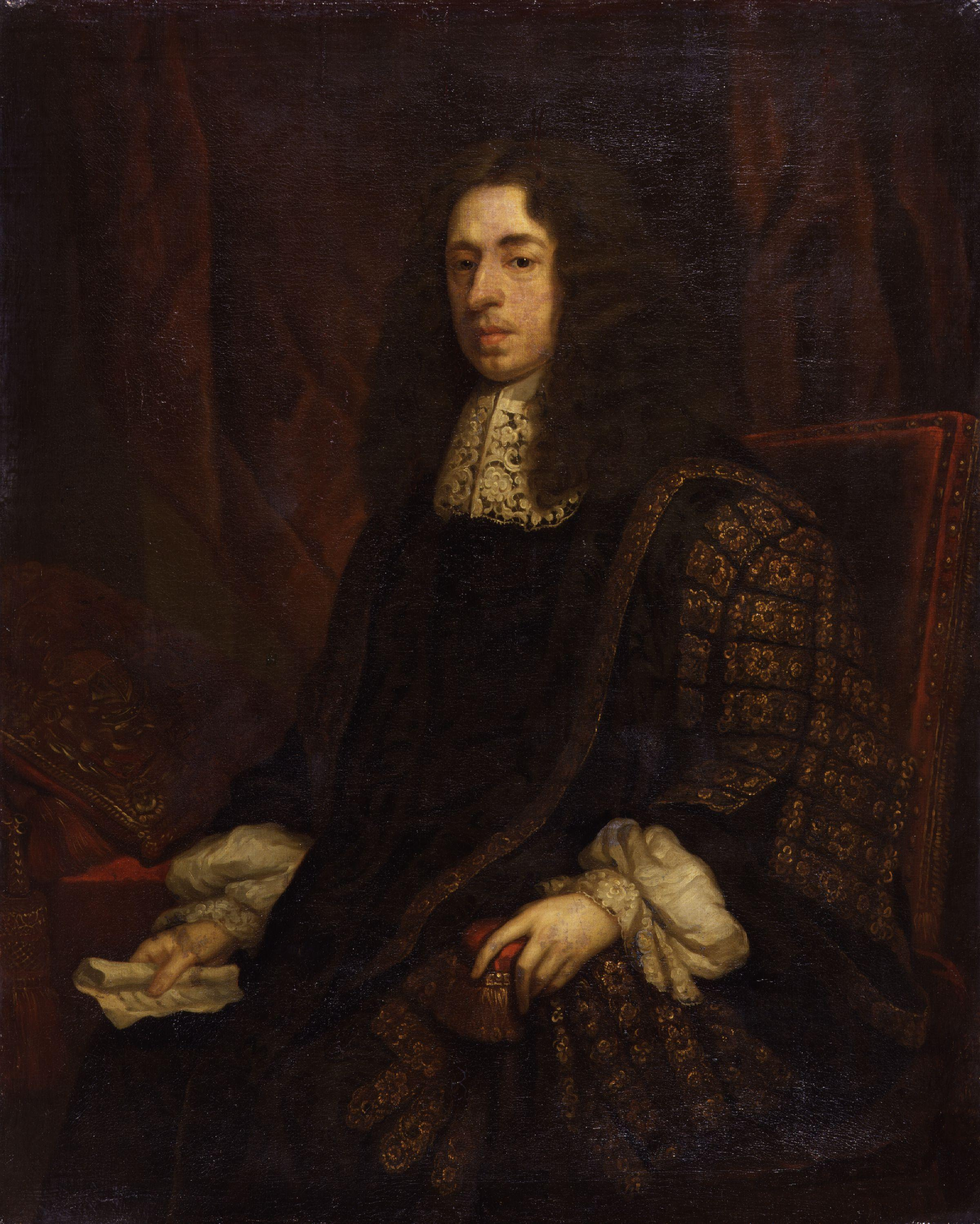
Heneage Finch, Michell and Canterbury.

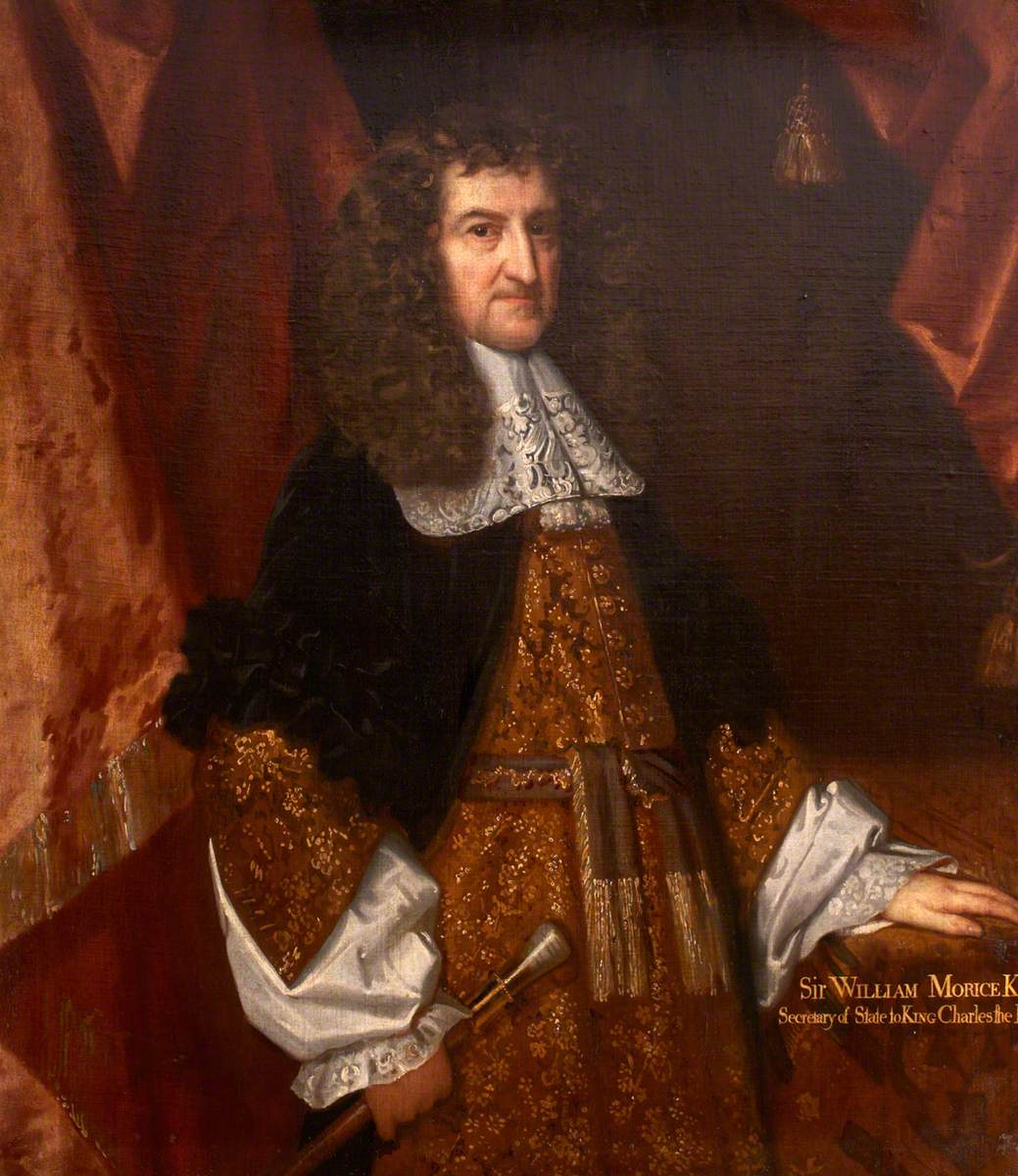
William Morice, Newport

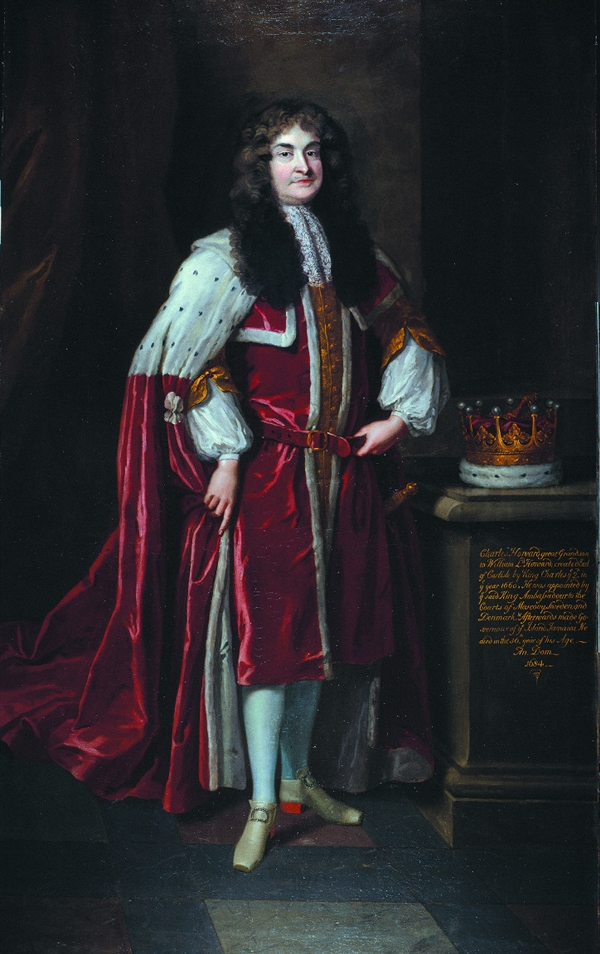
Charles Howard, Cumberland.

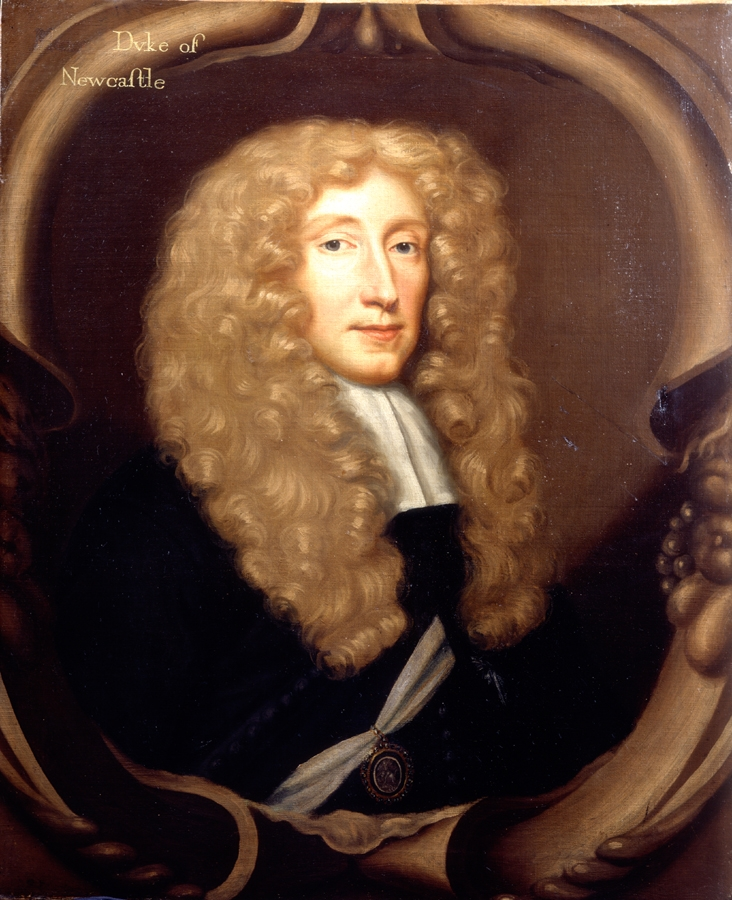
The Duke of Newcastle.

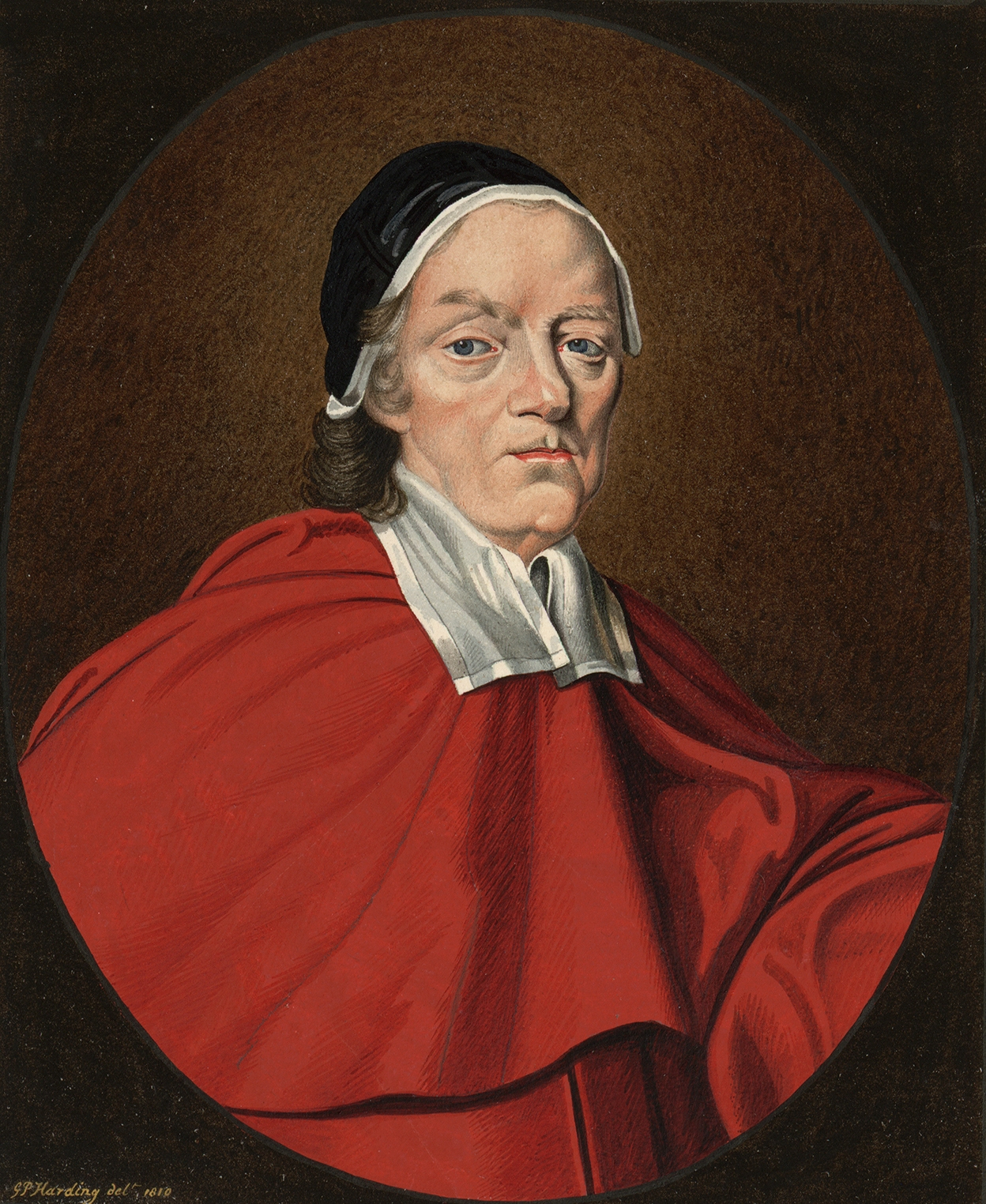
John Maynard, Tavistock

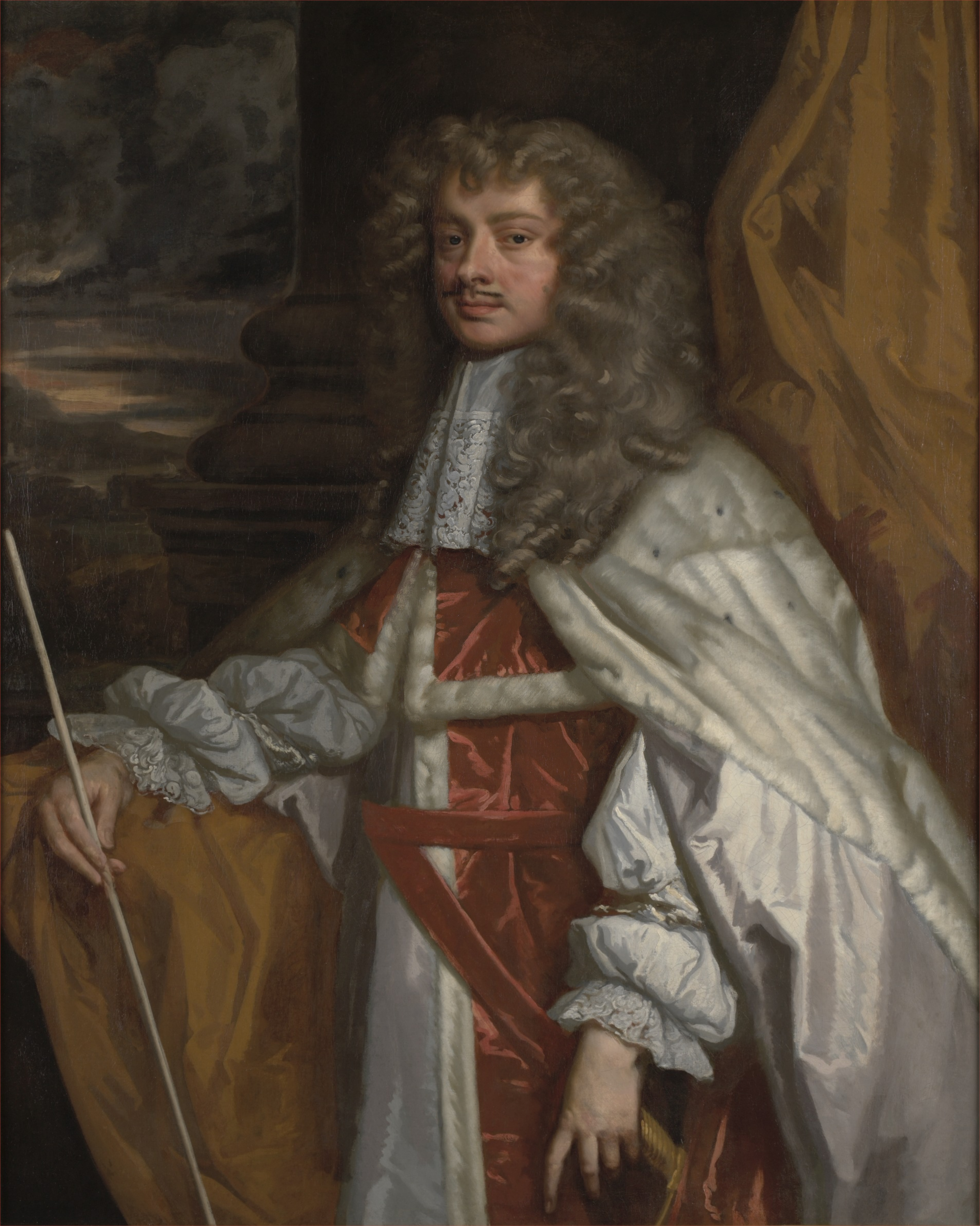
Thomas Clifford, Totnes

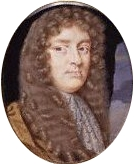
William Russell, Tavistock

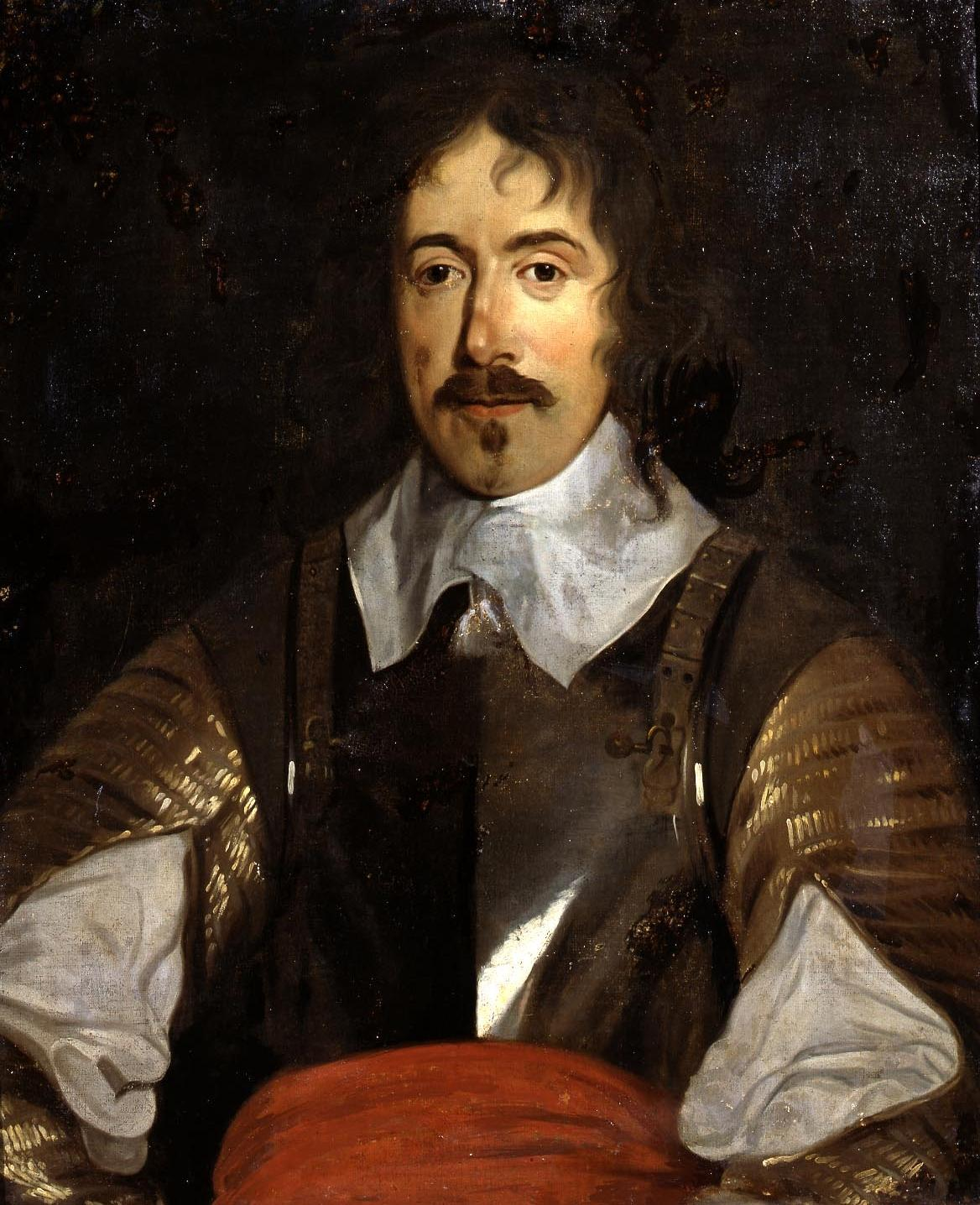
Denzil Holles, Dorchester

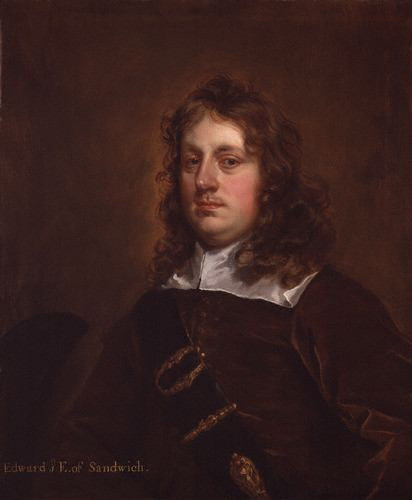
Edward Montagu, Weymouth and Dover

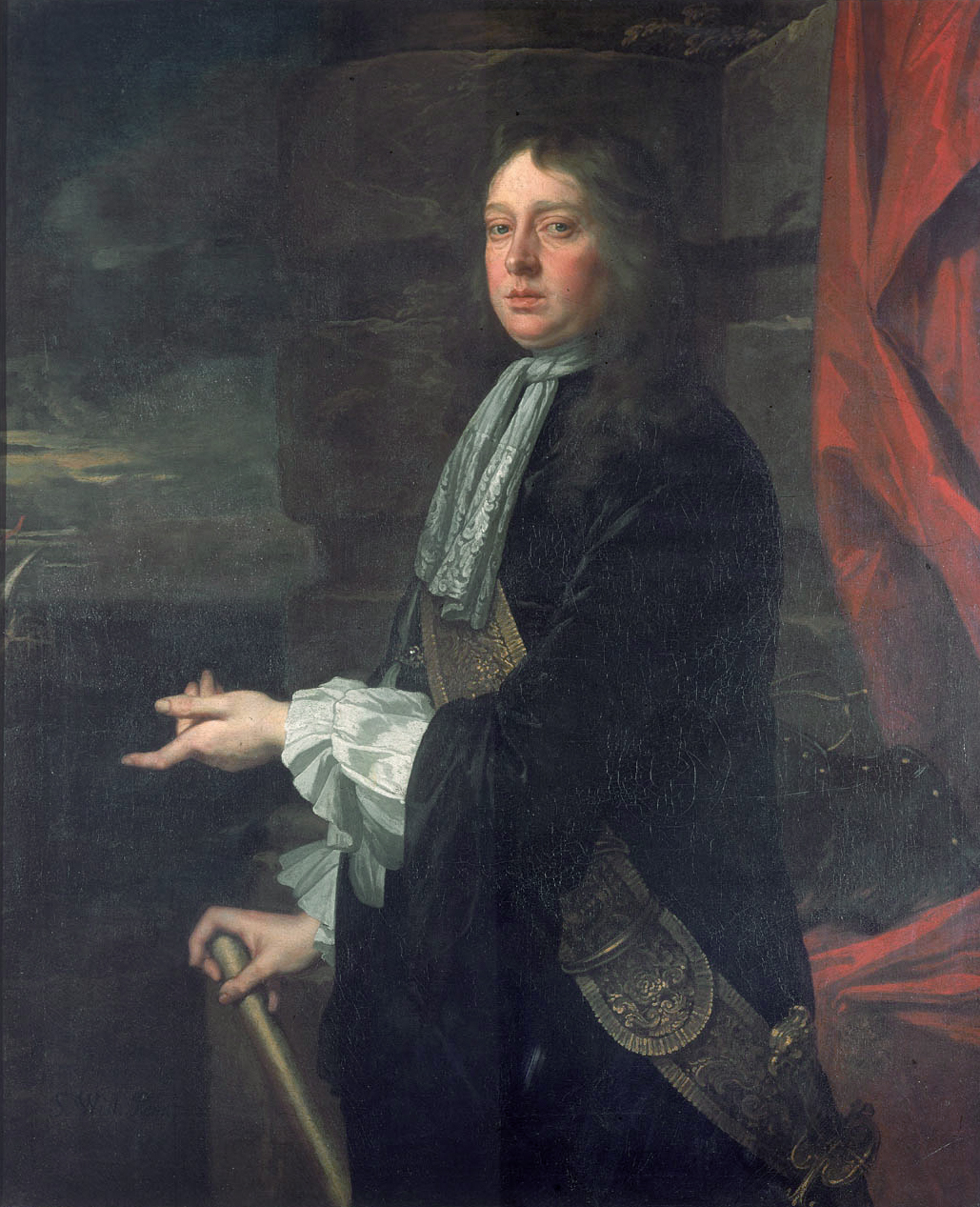
William Penn, Dorchester

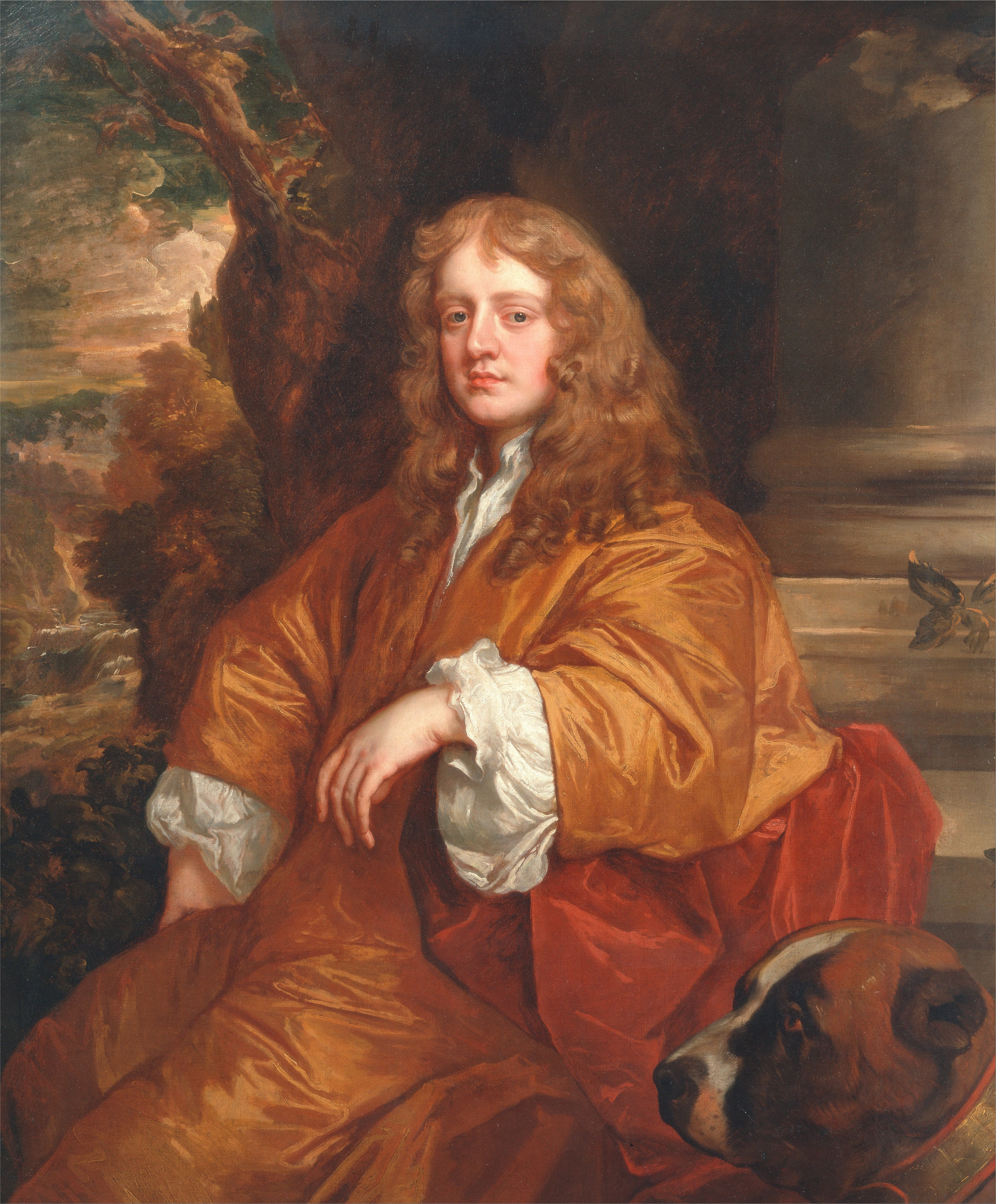
Sir Ralph Bankes, Corfe Castle

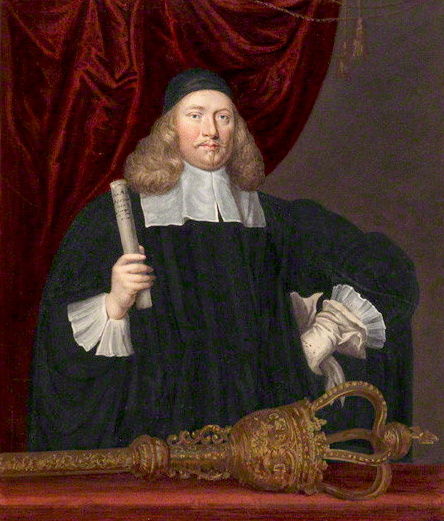
Edward Turnour, Essex

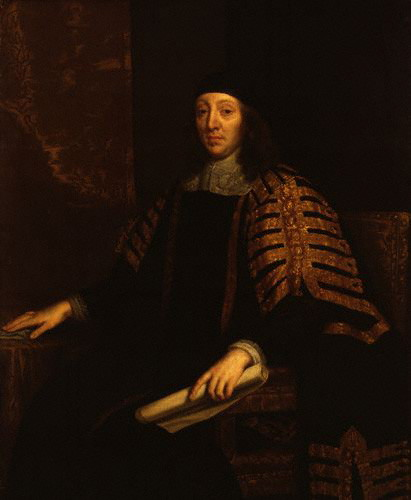
Sir Harbottle Grimston Colchester

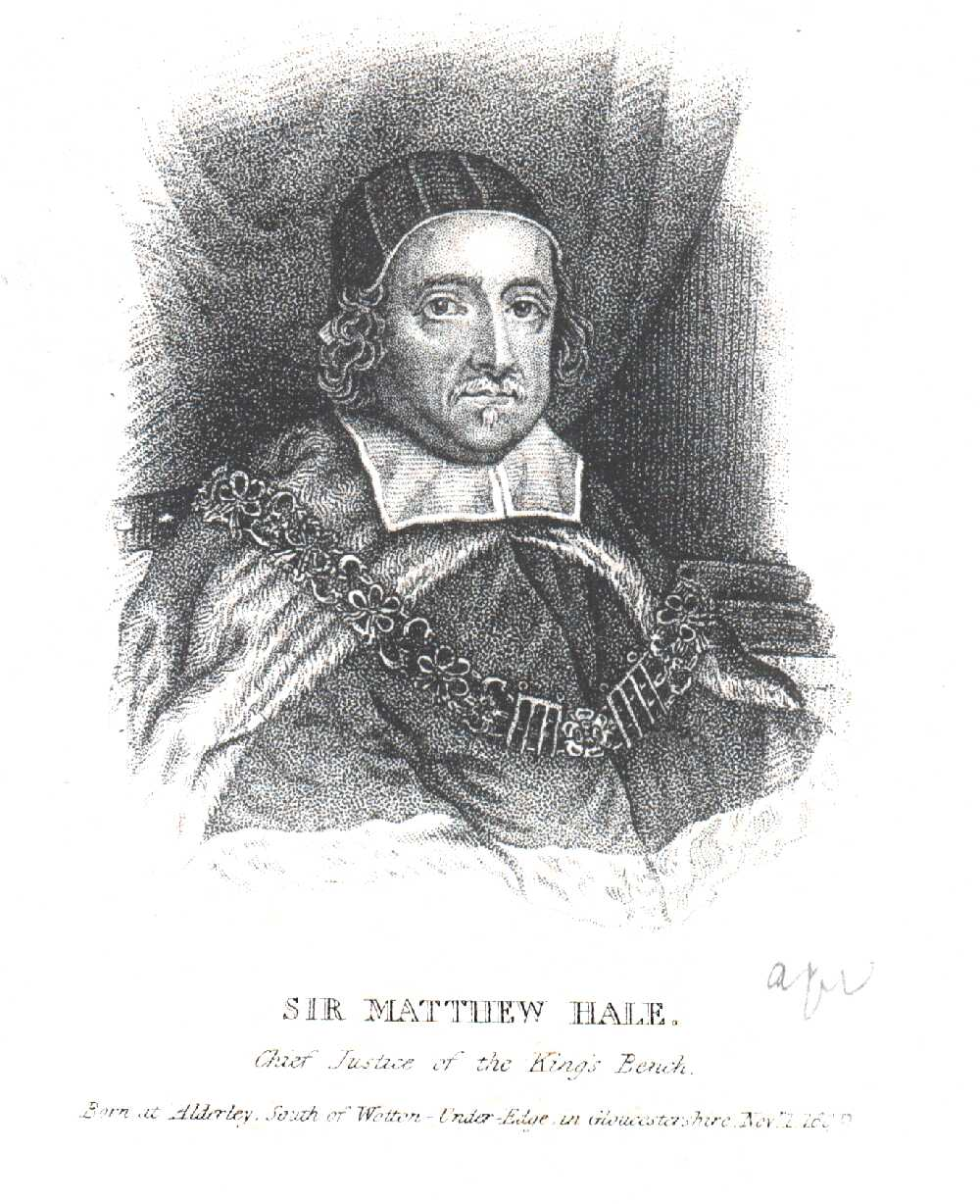
Matthew Hale, Gloucestershire

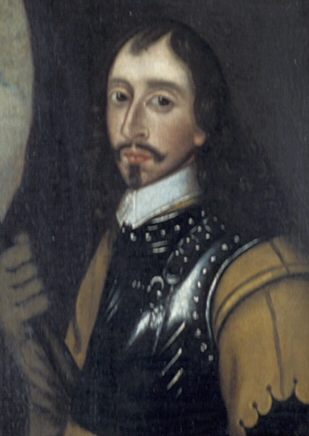
Sir Edward Massie

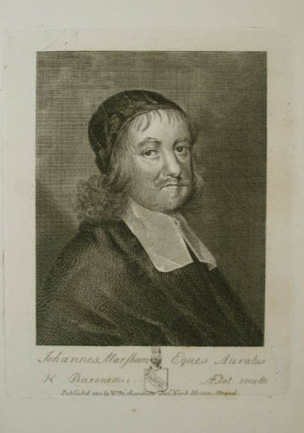
John Marsham, Rochester

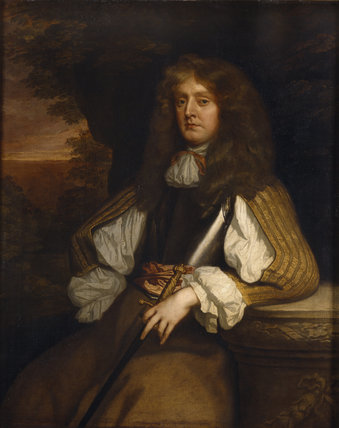
Richard Legh, Newton

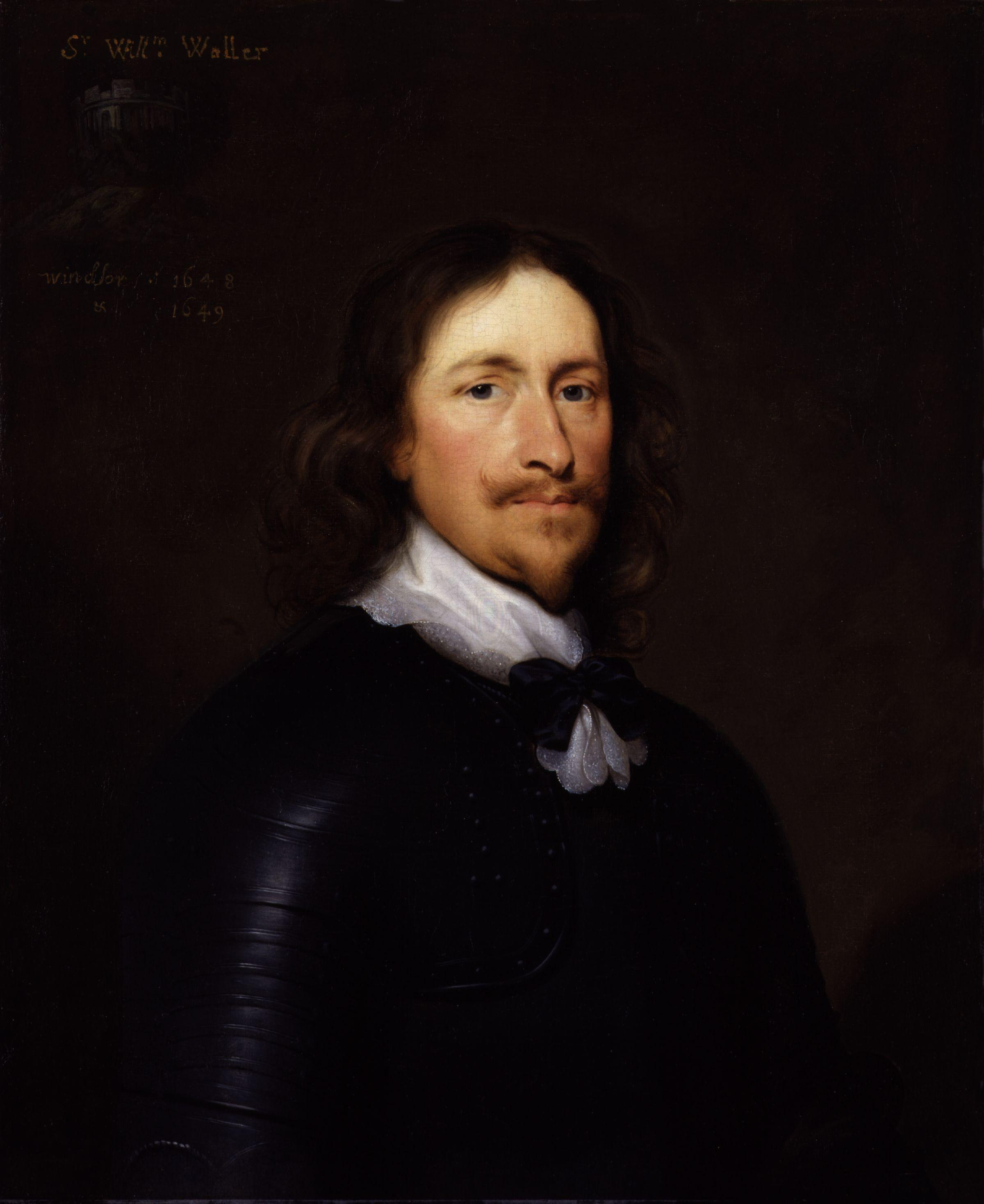
William Waller, Middlesex

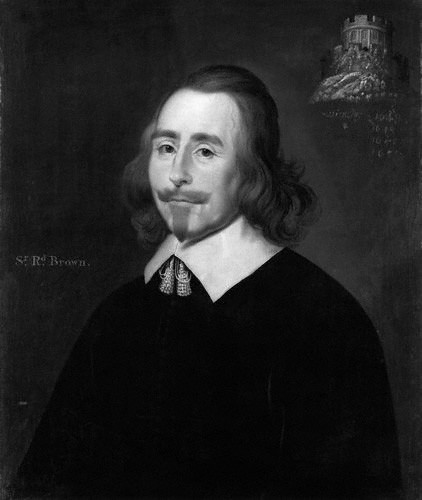
Richard Browne, London.

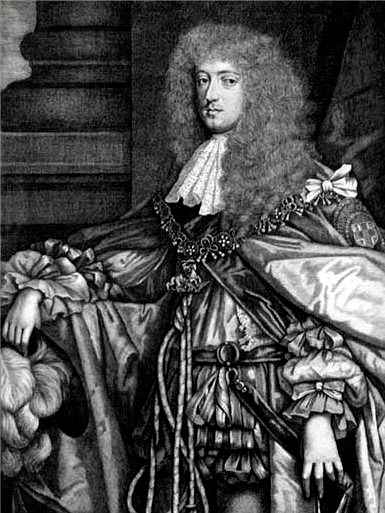
Henry Somerset, Monmouthshire

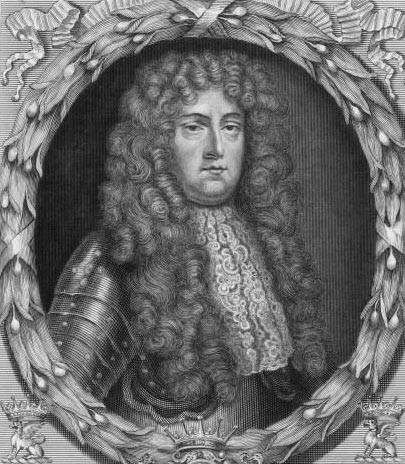
Robert Paston, Yarmouth

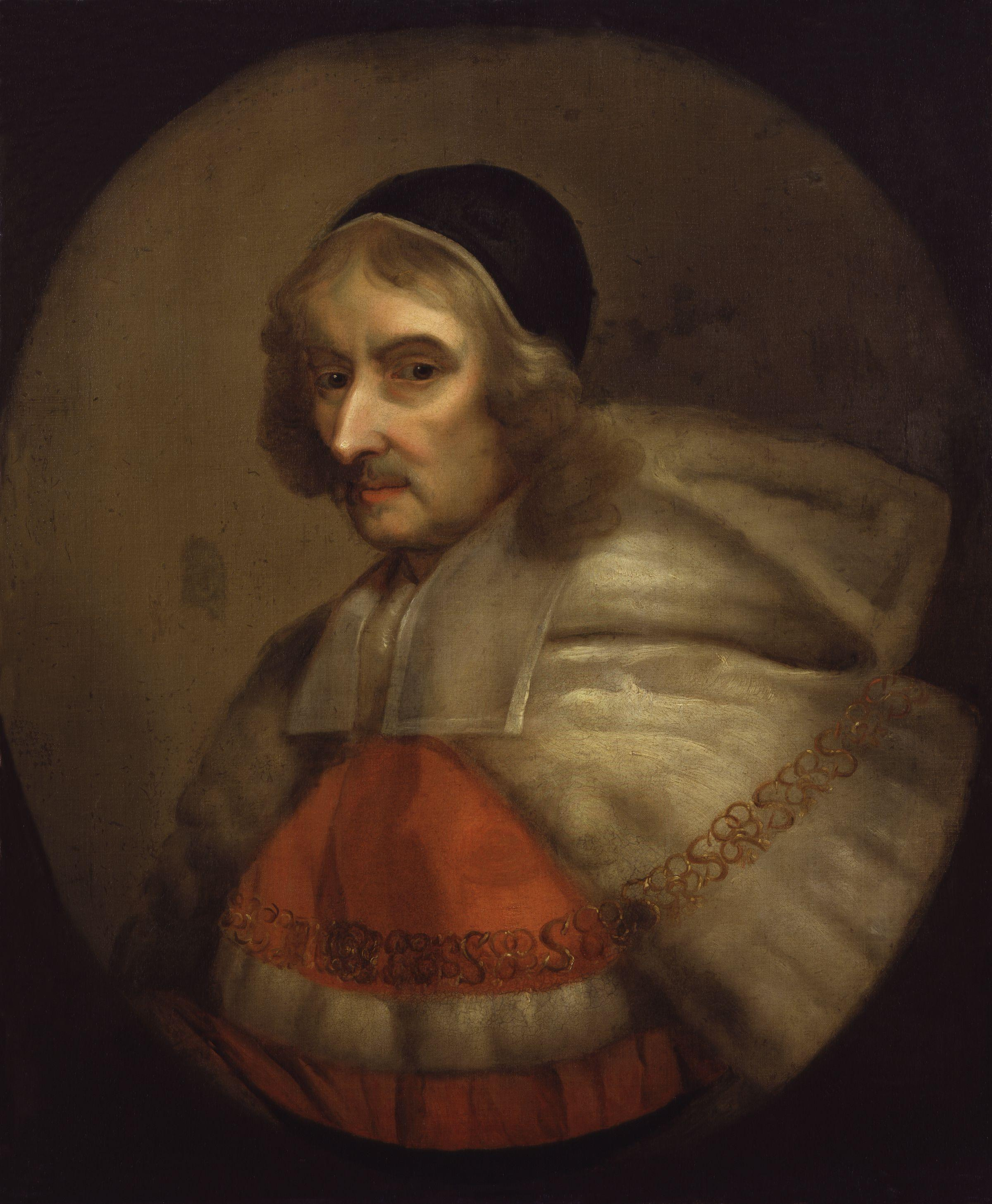
Richard Raynsford, Northampton

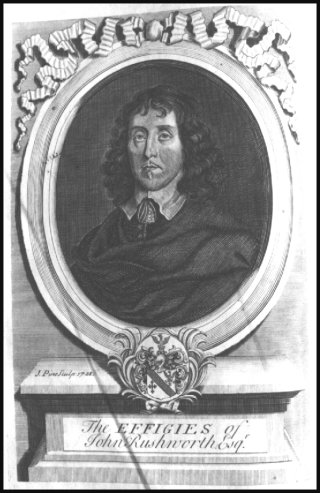
John Rushworth, Berwick.

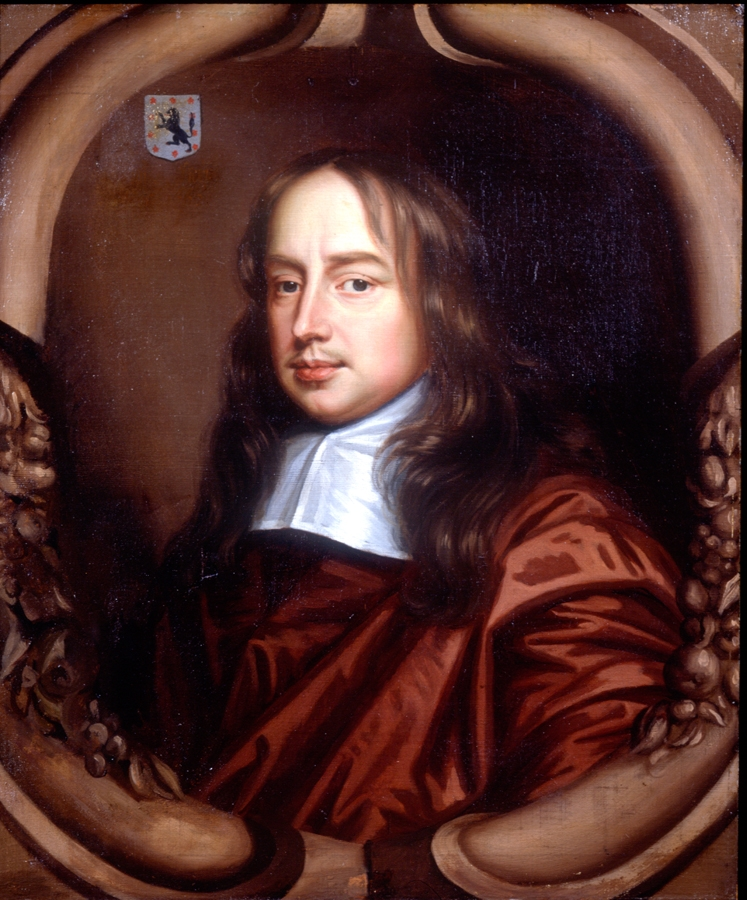
William Pierrepont, Nottinghamshire

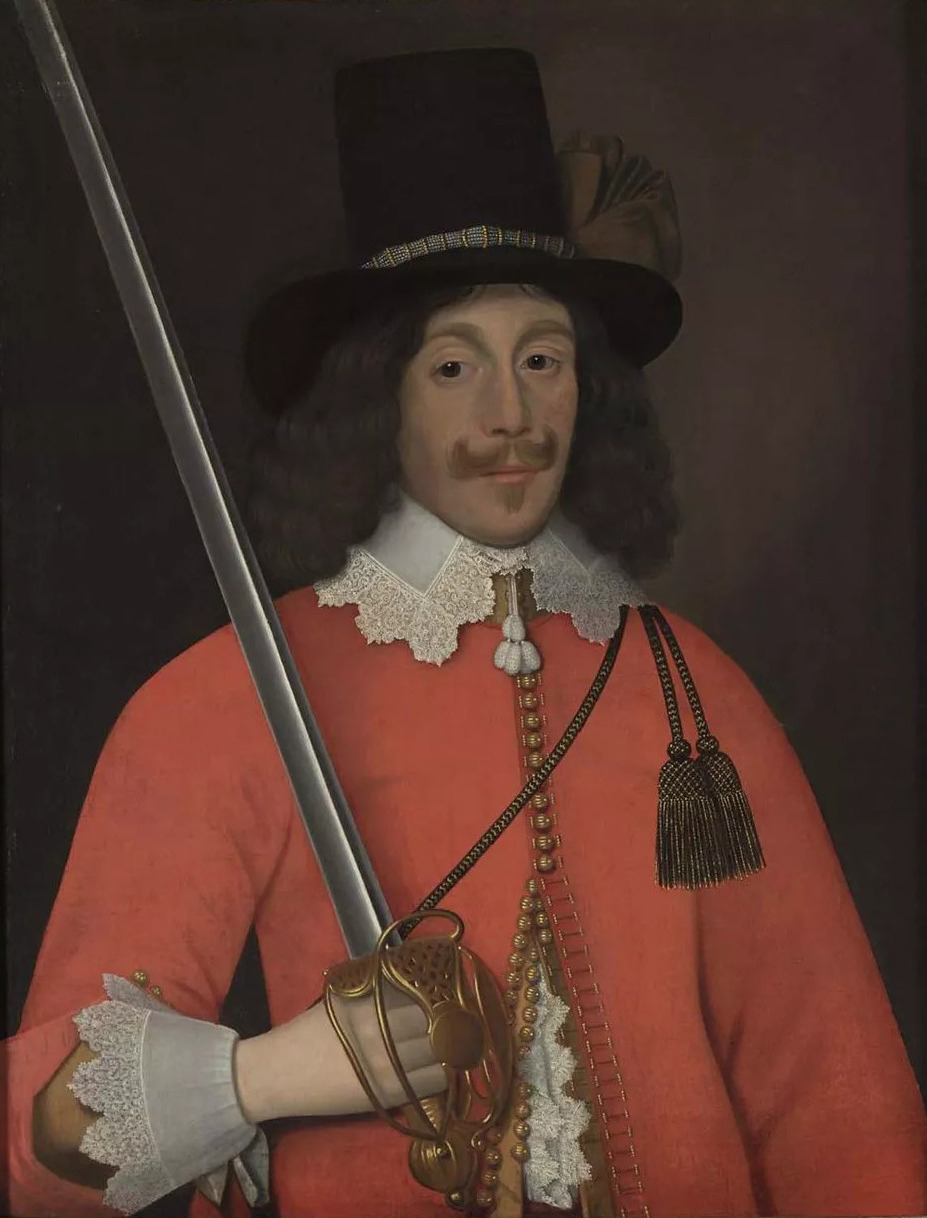
Colonel John Hutchinson, Nottingham

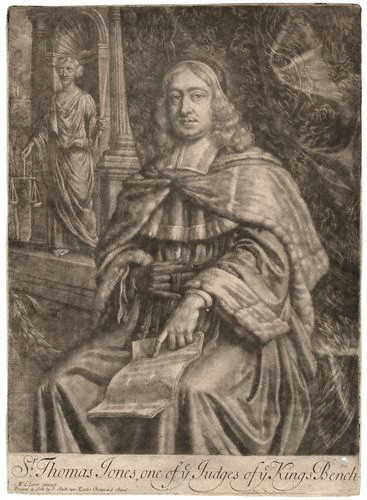
Thomas Jones, Shrewsbury

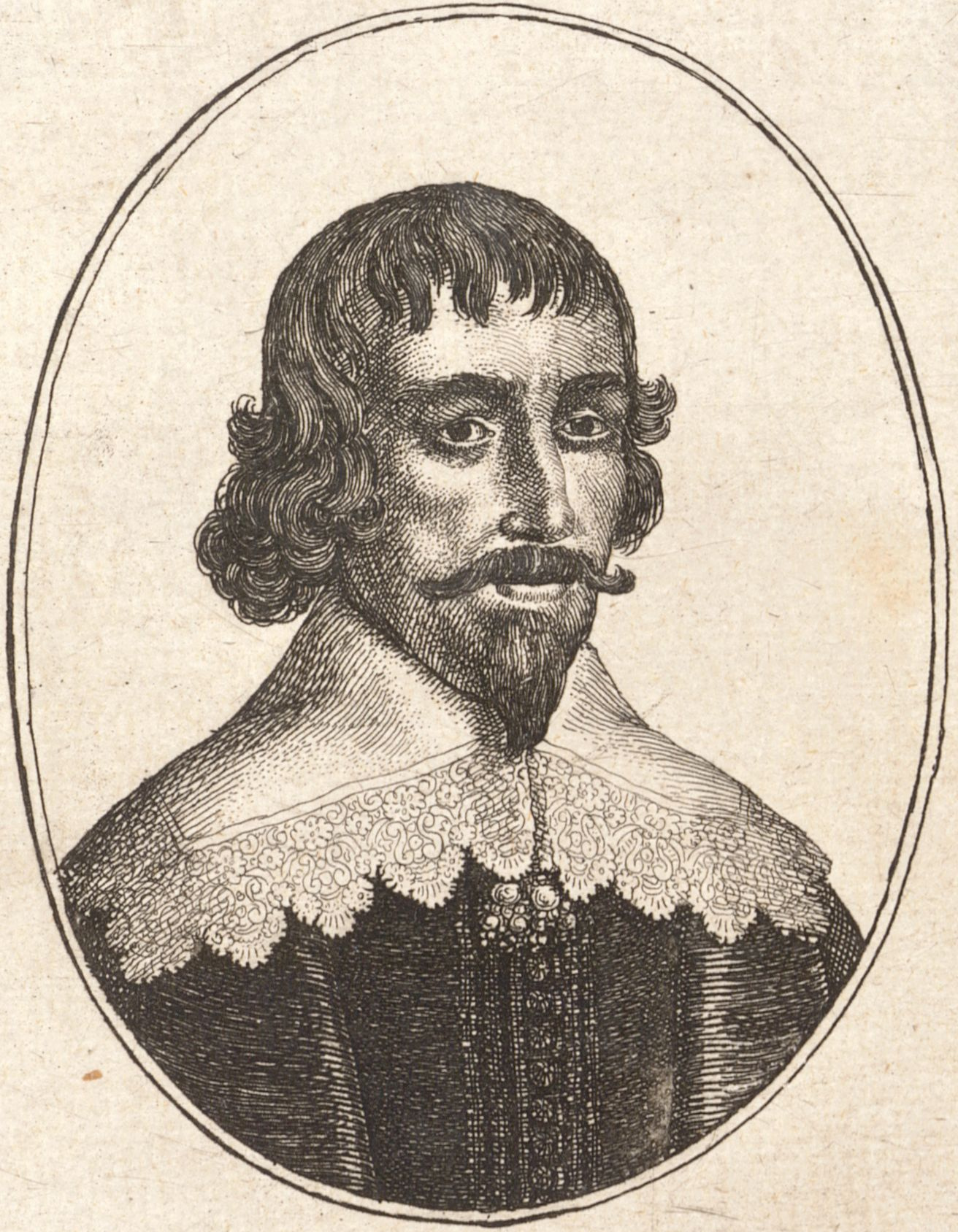
William Prynne, Bath

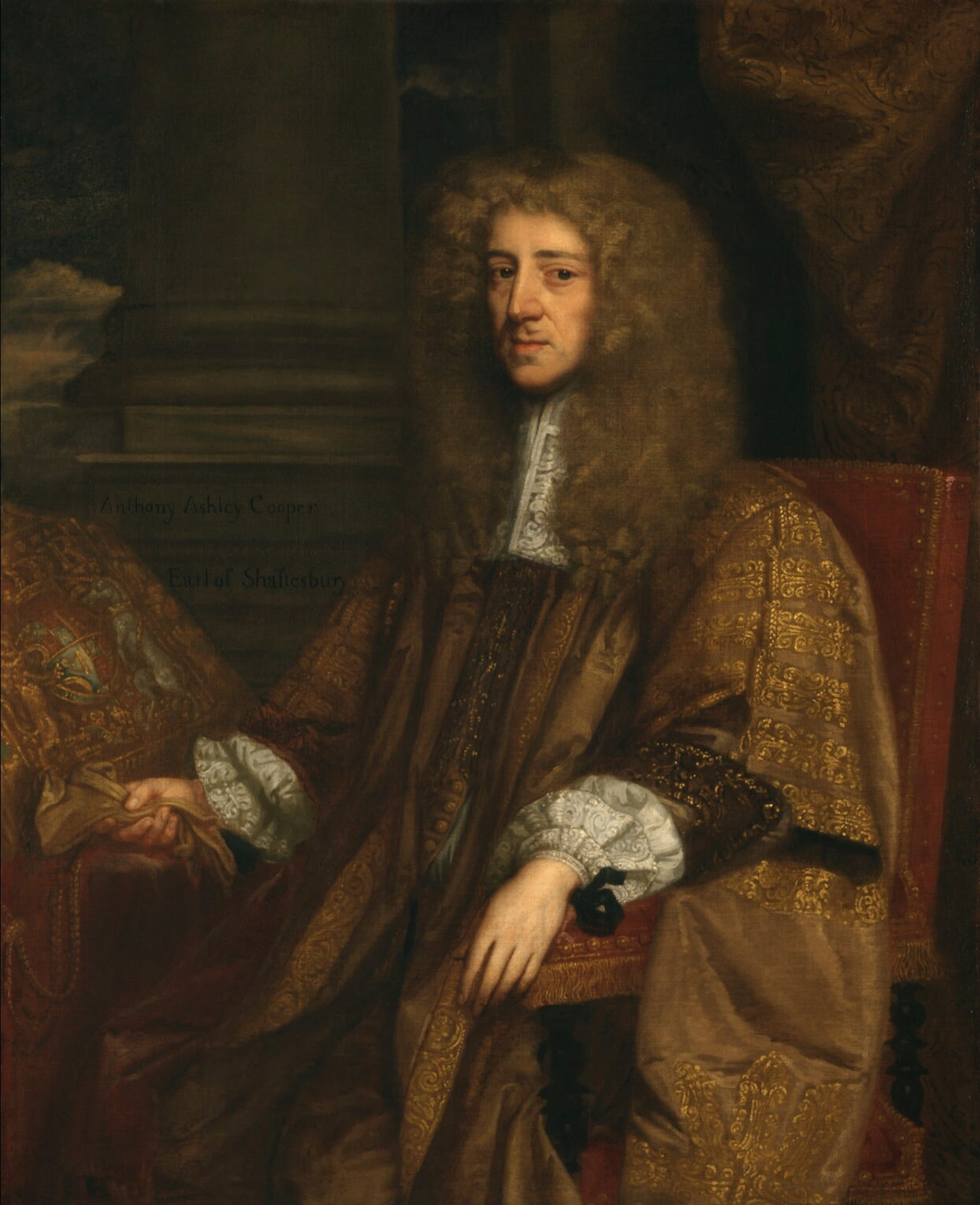
Sir Anthony Ashley Cooper, Wiltshire

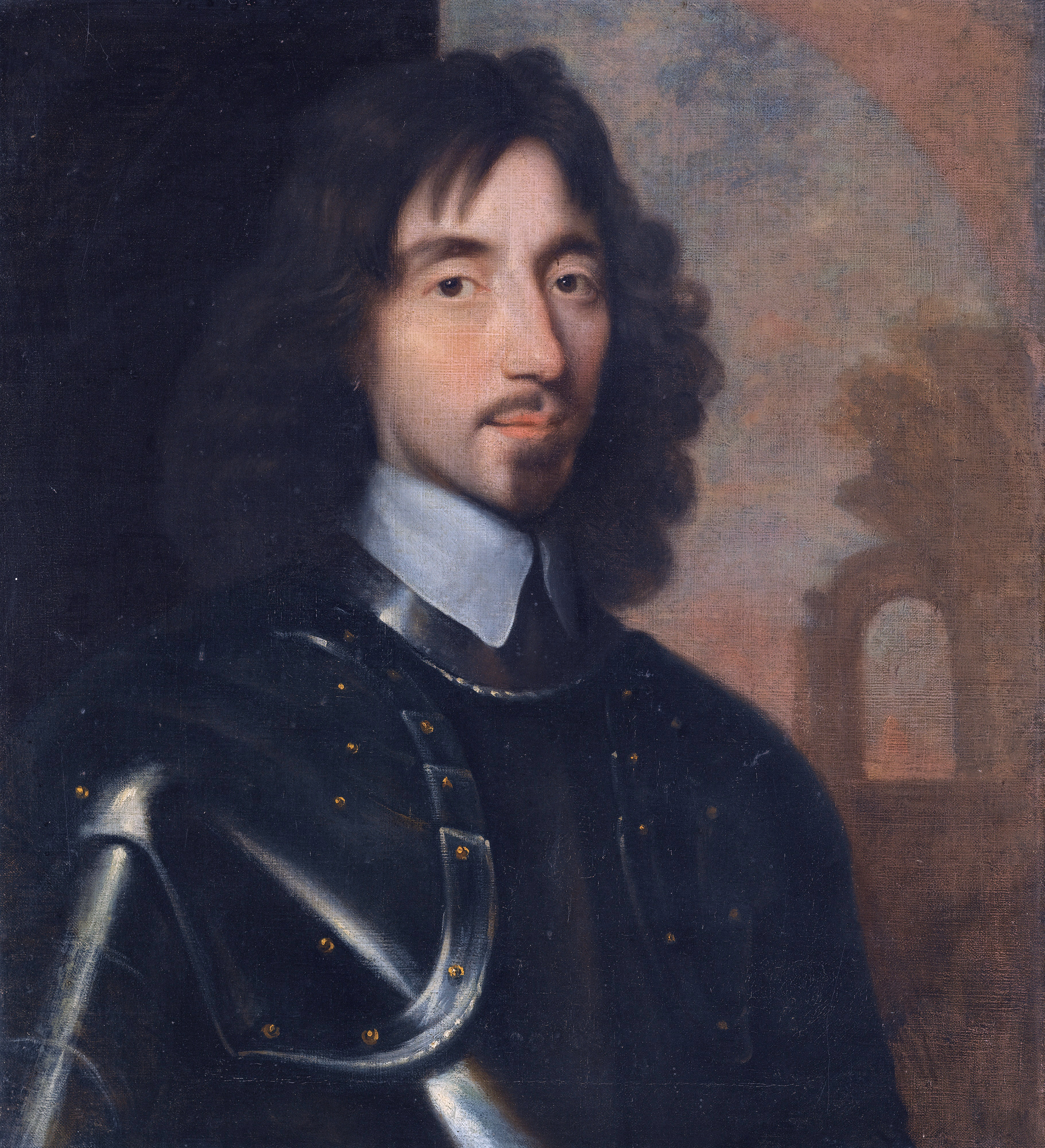
Thomas Fairfax, Yorkshire

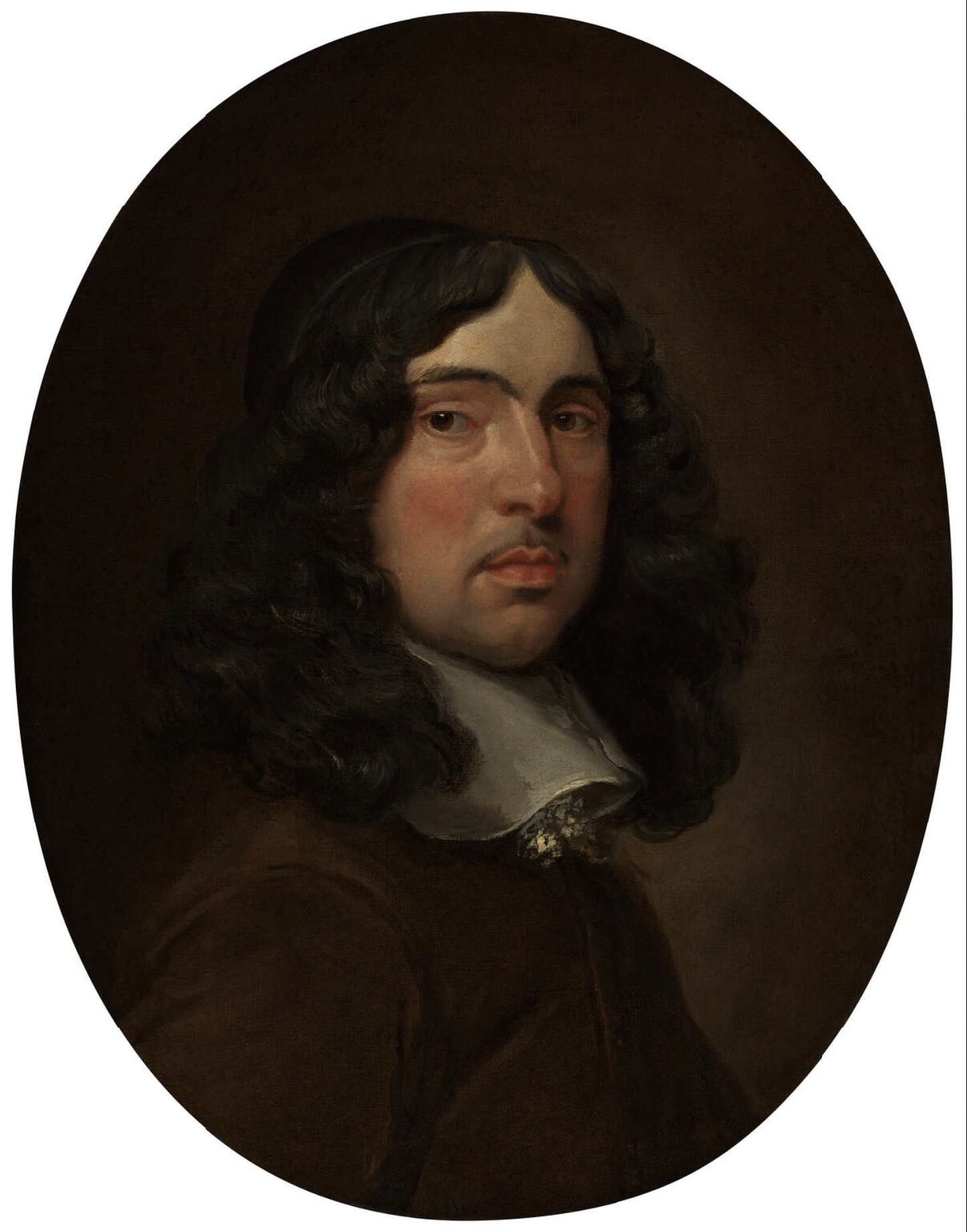
Andrew Marvell, Hull

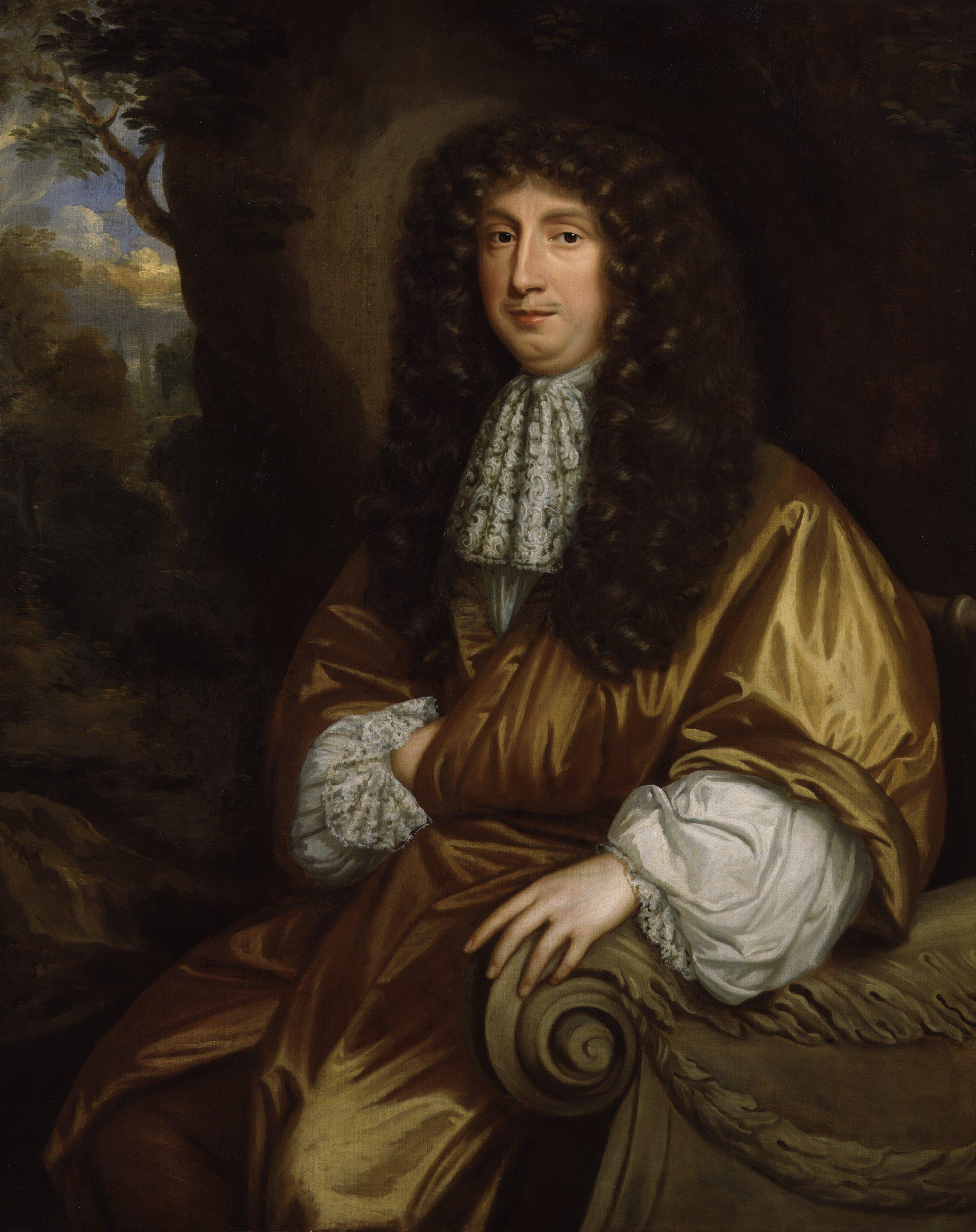
George Savile, Pontefract

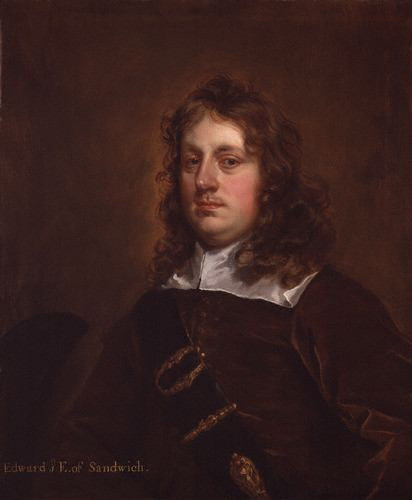
Edward Montagu, Dover

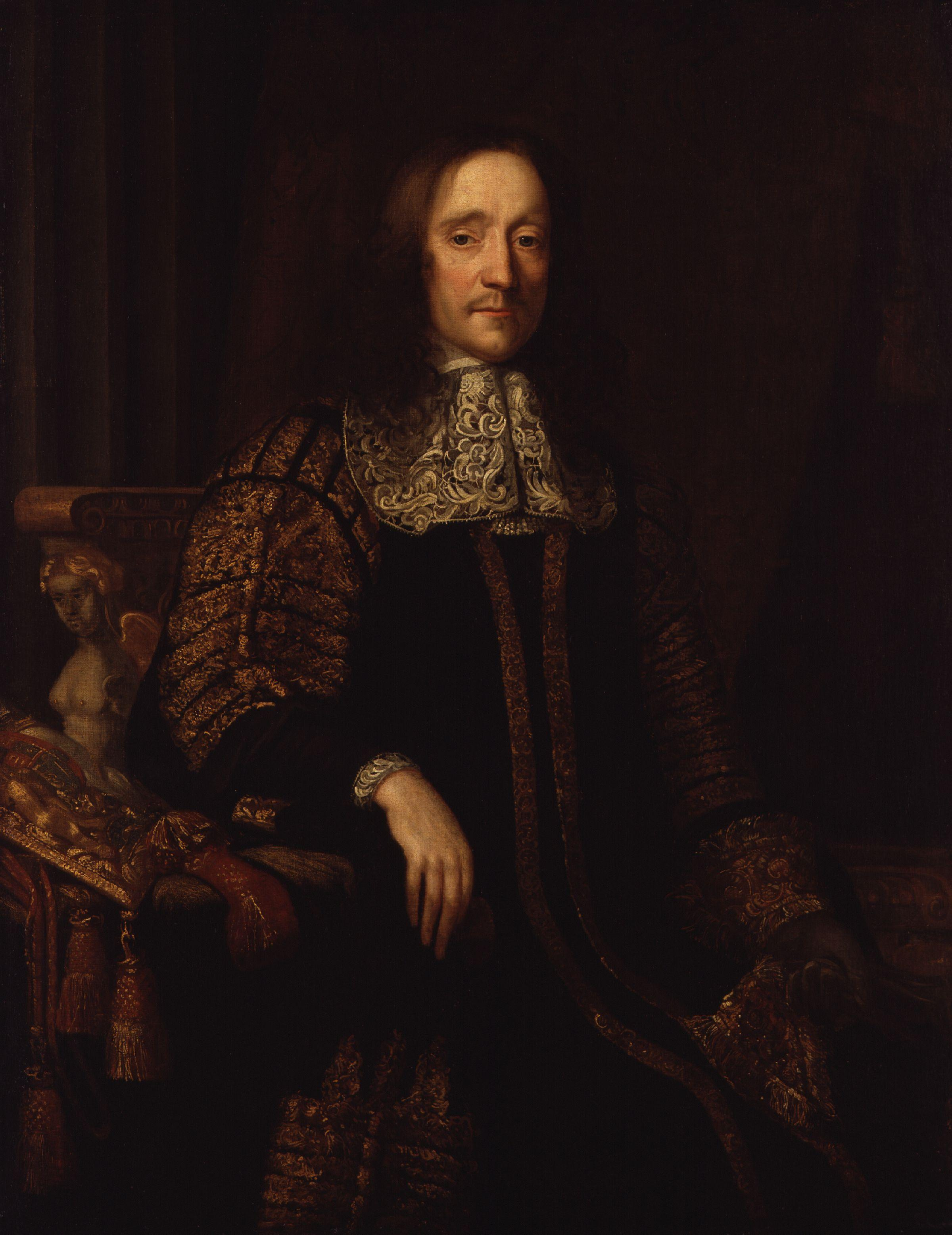
Arthur Annesley, Carmarthen

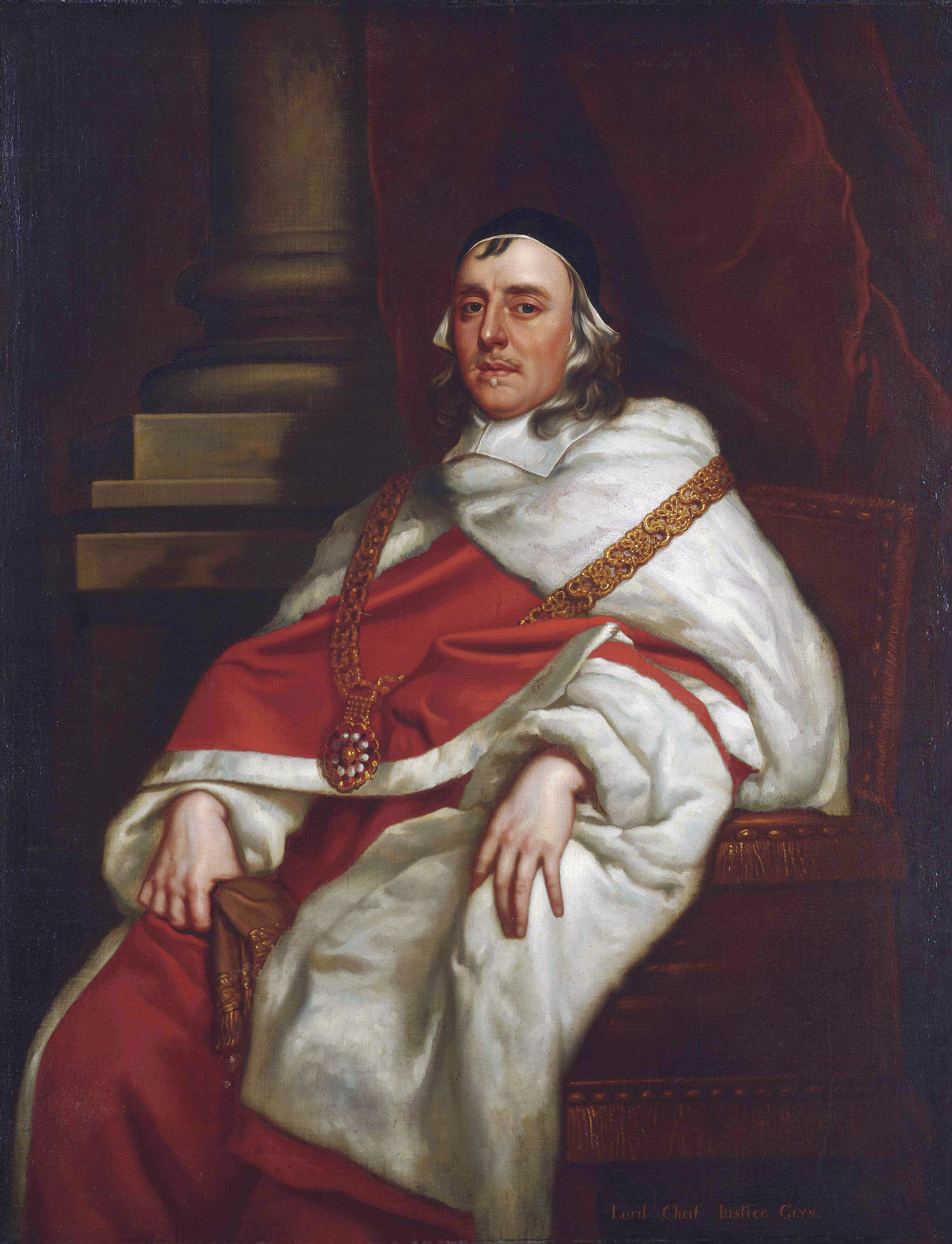
John Glynne, Carnarvonshire

This list contains details of the MPs elected in 1660.

=== Bedfordshire ===
Constituency	Members	Notes
Bedfordshire	Robert, Lord Bruce; Samuel Browne	
Bedford	Sir Samuel Luke; Humphrey Winch	Winch created baronet 1660
=== Berkshire ===
Constituency	Members	Notes
Berkshire	Richard Powle; Sir Robert Pye	
Abingdon	Sir George Stonhouse, 3rd Baronet	
Reading	John Blagrave; Thomas Rich	
Wallingford	Robert Packer; Hungerford Dunch	Dunch chose to sit for Cricklade - replaced by Thomas Saunders
Windsor	Alexander Baker; Roger Palmer	
=== Buckinghamshire ===
Constituency	Members	Notes
Buckinghamshire	William Bowyer; Thomas Tyrrill	
Amersham	Charles Cheyne; Thomas Proby	
Aylesbury	Richard Ingoldsby; Thomas Lee	
Buckingham	John Dormer; Sir Richard Temple, 3rd Baronet	
Marlow	Peregrine Hoby; William Borlase	
Wendover	Richard Hampden; John Baldwin	
Wycombe	Edmund Petty; Richard Browne	Browne knighted 1660
=== Cambridgeshire ===
Constituency	Members	Notes
Cambridgeshire	Thomas Wendy; Isaac Thornton	
Cambridge	Sir Dudley North; Sir Thomas Wills, 1st Baronet	
Cambridge University	George Monck; Thomas Crouch	Monck sat for Devon - replaced by William Montagu
=== Cheshire ===
Constituency	Members	Notes
Cheshire	Sir George Booth, 2nd Baronet; Thomas Mainwaring	Mainwaring created baronet 1660
City of Chester	John Ratcliffe; William Ince	
=== Cornwall ===
Constituency	Members	Notes
Cornwall	Sir John Carew, 3rd Baronet; Robert Robartes	
Bodmin	Hender Robartes; John Silly	
Bossiney	Francis Gerard; Charles Pym	
Callington	Robert Rolle; Edward Herle	
Camelford	Peter Killigrew; Samuel Trelawny	Double return - seated 5 May - election voided 27 June
Fowey	Edward Herle; John Barton	
Grampound	Thomas Herle; Hugh Boscawen	
Helston	Anthony Rous; Alexander Penhellick	Double return - seated 5 May - election voided 12 June
Launceston	Thomas Gewen; Edward Eliot	
Liskeard	John Connock; John Robinson	Double return - seated 5 May
Eastlow	Henry Seymour; Jonathan Trelawny	
Westlow	John Buller; John Kendall	
Lostwithiel	Walter Moyle; John Clayton	
Mitchel	Thomas Carew; Heneage Finch	Double return - seated 5 May
Newport	William Morice; Sir Francis Drake, 2nd Baronet	
Penryn	Samuel Enys; James Robyns	
St Germans	John Eliot; Richard Knightley	
St Ives	John St Aubyn; James Praed	
St Mawes	William Tredenham; Arthur Spry	
Saltash	Francis Buller; Anthony Buller	
Tregoney	Sir John Temple; Edward Boscawen	Double return - seated 5 May
Truro	Edward Boscowen; Walter Vincent	
=== Cumberland ===
Constituency	Members	Notes
Cumberland	Sir Wilfred Lawson; Charles Howard	
Carlisle	William Briscoe; Jeremiah Tolhurst	
Cockermouth	Richard Tolson; Wilfrid Lawson	
=== Derbyshire ===
Constituency	Members	Notes
Derbyshire	Viscount Mansfield; John Ferrers	
Derby	Roger Allestry; John Dalton	
=== Devon ===
Constituency	Members	Notes
Devon	Sir John Northcote, 1st Baronet; George Monck	Monck also elected for Cambridge University
Ashburton	John Fowell; Sir William Courtenay, 1st Baronet	
Barnstaple	John Rolle; Nicholas Dennys	
Bere Alston	John Maynard; George Howard	Maynard chose to sit for Tavistock - replaced by Richard Arundell
Clifton Dartmouth Hardness	John Frederick; John Hale	
Exeter	Thomas Bampfield; John Maynard	
Honiton	John Yonge; Samuel Serle	
Okehampton	Josias Calmady; Edward Wise	
Plymouth	John Maynard; Edmund Fowell	Double Return. Maynard and Fowell replaced in June 1660 by William Morice and Samuel Trelawny. Maynard sat for Exeter, Fowell retired.
Plympton Erle	William Strode; Christopher Martyn	
Tavistock	William Russell; George Howard	Double return - Howard seated 27 April
Tiverton	Thomas Bampfield; Robert Shapcote	Bampfield chose to sit for Exeter - replaced July 1660 by Roger Colman; Colman died - replaced by Henry Newte
Totnes	Thomas Chafe; Thomas Clifford	
=== Dorset ===
Constituency	Members	Notes
Dorset	John Fitzjames; Robert Coker	
Bridport	John Drake; Henry Henley	
Corfe Castle	Ralph Bankes; John Tregonwell	
Dorchester	Denzil Holles; John Whiteway	
Lyme Regis	Walter Yonge; Thomas Moore	Moore sat for Heytesbury and was replaced 18 June 1660 by Henry Hyde
Poole	George Cooper; Sir Walter Erle	
Shaftesbury	Thomas Grove; James Baker	
Wareham	George Pitt; Robert Culliford	
Weymouth	Edward Montagu; William Penn	Montagu sat for Dover and was replaced by Bullen Reymes
Melcombe	Henry Waltham; Peter Middleton	Double return - Middleton seated 5 May
=== Essex ===
Constituency	Members	Notes
Essex	John Bramston; Edward Turnor	
Colchester	John Shaw; Sir Harbottle Grimston, 2nd Baronet	
Harwich	Capel Luckyn; Henry Wright	
Maldon	Henry Mildmay; Tristram Conyers	Double return - Mildmay seated 27 Apr 1660 but election voided. Replaced by Edward Herrys
=== Gloucestershire ===
Constituency	Members	Notes
Gloucestershire	Edward Stephens; Matthew Hale	
Cirencester	Thomas Master; Henry Powle	
Gloucester	Edward Massie; James Stephens	
Tewkesbury	Henry Capell, 1st Baron Capell; Richard Dowdeswell	
=== Hampshire ===
Constituency	Members	Notes
Andover	John Trott; John Collins	
Christchurch	John Hildesley; Henry Tulse	
Hampshire	John Bulkeley; Richard Norton	
Lymington	John Button jun. Henry Bromfield	
Newport al. Medina	William Oglander; Robert Dillington	
Newtown	Sir John Barrington, 3rd Baronet; Sir Henry Worsley, 2nd Baronet	
Petersfield	Thomas Cole; Arthur Bold	
Portsmouth	Richard Norton; Henry Whithed	Norton chose to sit for Hampshire - replaced by Andrew Henley
Southampton	William Stanley; Robert Richbell	
Stockbridge	Francis Rivett; John Evelyn	
Whitchurch	Robert Wallop; Giles Hungerford	
Winchester	John Hooke; Thomas Cole	
Yarmouth	Sir John Leigh; Richard Lucy	
=== Herefordshire ===
Constituency	Members	Notes
Herefordshire	Edward Harley; William Powell	
Hereford	Herbert Westfaling; Roger Bosworth	
Leominster	John Birch; Edward Pytts	
Weobley	James Pytts; Richard Weston	Election declared void 16 July
=== Hertfordshire ===
Constituency	Members	Notes
Hertfordshire	Rowland Lytton; Henry Caesar	
Hertford	Arthur Sparke; James Cowper	
St Albans	Richard Jennings; William Foxwist	
=== Huntingdonshire ===
Constituency	Members	Notes
Huntingdonshire	Henry Cromwell-Williams; Viscount Mandeville	
Huntingdon	Nicholas Pedley; John Bernard	
=== Kent (see also Cinque Ports) ===
Constituency	Members	Notes
Kent	Sir John Tufton, 2nd Baronet; Sir Edward Dering, 2nd Baronet	
Canterbury	Sir Anthony Aucher; Heneage Finch	
Maidstone	Thomas Twisden; Robert Barnham	Twisden replaced by Sir Edward Hales, 2nd Baronet
Queenborough	James Herbert; William Wheler	
Rochester	John Marsham; Peter Pett	
=== Lancashire ===
Constituency	Members	Notes
Lancashire	Sir Robert Bindlosse, 1st Baronet; Roger Bradshaigh	
Clitheroe	Sir Ralph Assheton, 2nd Baronet, of Lever; William White	
Lancaster	Col.William West; Sir Gilbert Gerard, 1st Baronet of Harrow on the Hill	
Liverpool	Gilbert Ireland; William Stanley	
Newton	Richard Legh; William Banks	
Preston	Alexander Rigby; Richard Standish	
Wigan	Hugh Forth; William Gardiner	
=== Leicestershire ===
Constituency	Members	Notes
Leicestershire	Thomas Merry; Matthew Babington	
Leicester	Thomas Armeston; John Grey	
=== Lincolnshire ===
Constituency	Members	Notes
Lincolnshire	Edward Rossiter; Viscount Castleton	
Boston	Sir Anthony Irby; Thomas Hatcher	
Grantham	John Newton; Thomas Skipwith	
Grimsby	William Wray; Edward King	
Lincoln	John Monson; Thomas Meres	
Stamford	John Hatcher; Francis Wingfield	
=== Middlesex ===
Constituency	Members	Notes
Middlesex	Lancelot Lake; Sir William Waller	
City of London	William Wilde; John Robinson; William Vincent; Richard Browne	
Westminster	Gilbert Gerard; Thomas Clarges	
=== Monmouthshire ===
Constituency	Members	Notes
Monmouthshire	William Morgan; Henry Somerset	
Monmouth	Sir Trevor Williams, 1st Baronet	
=== Norfolk ===
Constituency	Members	Notes
Norfolk	Sir Horatio Townsend, 3rd Baronet; The Lord Cramond	
Castle Rising	Sir John Holland, 1st Baronet; John Spelman	
Yarmouth	Sir John Potts, 1st Baronet; William D'Oyly	
King's Lynn	Sir Ralph Hare, 1st Baronet; Edward Walpole	
Norwich	William Barnham; Thomas Rant	
Thetford	Sir Philip Wodehouse, 3rd Baronet; Robert Paston	
=== Northamptonshire ===
Constituency	Members	Notes
Northamptonshire	John Crew; Sir Henry Yelverton, 2nd Baronet	
Brackley	Thomas Crew; William Lisle	
Higham Ferrars	Sir Thomas Dacres	
Northampton	Francis Harvey; Sir Richard Rainsford	
Peterborough	Humphrey Orme; Charles Fane, Lord le Despencer	
=== Northumberland ===
Constituency	Members	Notes
Northumberland	Sir William Fenwick, 2nd Baronet; Ralph Delaval	
Berwick upon Tweed	John Rushworth; Sir Thomas Widdrington	Widdrington chose York - replaced by Edward Grey
Morpeth	Thomas Widdrington; Ralph Knight	
Newcastle	Robert Ellison; Sir Francis Anderson	
=== Nottinghamshire ===
Constituency	Members	Notes
Nottinghamshire	Lord Houghton; William Pierrepont	
East Retford	Sir William Hickman, 2nd Baronet; Wentworth Fitzgerald, 17th Earl of Kildare	
Nottingham	Arthur Stanhope; John Hutchinson	Hutchinson discharged as Regicide. Replaced by Robert Pierrepont
=== Oxfordshire ===
Constituency	Members	Notes
Oxfordshire	Thomas Viscount Wenman; Hon. James Fiennes	
Oxford	Henry Cary, 4th Viscount Falkland; James Huxley	
Oxford University	Thomas Clayton; John Mylles	
Woodstock	Sir Thomas Spencer, 3rd Baronet; Edward Atkins	
Banbury	Sir Anthony Cope, 4th Baronet	
=== Rutland ===
Constituency	Members	Notes
Rutland	Philip Sherard; Samuel Browne	
=== Salop ===
Constituency	Members	Notes
Shropshire	Sir William Whitmore, 2nd Baronet; Henry Vernon	
Bishops Castle	Edmund Waring; William Oakeley	
Bridgnorth	Sir Walter Acton, 2nd Baronet; John Bennet	
Ludlow	Job Charlton; Timothy Littleton	
Shrewsbury	Samuel Jones; Thomas Jones	
Wenlock	Thomas Whitmore; Sir Francis Lawley, 2nd Baronet	
=== Somerset ===
Constituency	Members	Notes
Somerset	George Horner; Hugh Smith	
Bath	Alexander Popham; William Prynne	
Bridgwater	Sir Thomas Wroth; Francis Rolle	
Bristol	John Stephens; John Knight	
Ilchester	Robert Hunt; Henry Dunster	
Milborne Port	William Milborne; Michael Malet	
Minehead	Francis Luttrell; Charles Pym	
Taunton	William Wyndham; Thomas Gorges	
Wells	Henry Bull; Thomas White	
=== Staffordshire ===
Constituency	Members	Notes
Staffordshire	Edward Bagot; William Sneyd	
Lichfield	Daniel Watson; Michael Biddulph	Biddulph replaced by Thomas Minors
Newcastle under Lyme	Samuel Terrick; John Bowyer	
Stafford	John Swinfen; Sir Charles Wolseley, 2nd Baronet	
Tamworth	Richard Newdigate; Thomas Fox	
=== Suffolk ===
Constituency	Members	Notes
Suffolk	Sir Henry Felton, 2nd Baronet; Henry North	
Aldeburgh	Robert Brooke; Thomas Bacon	
Bury St Edmunds	Sir Henry Crofts; Sir John Duncombe	
Dunwich	John Rous; Henry Bedingfield	
Eye	Charles Cornwallis; George Reeve	
Ipswich	Nathaniel Bacon; Francis Bacon	
Orford	Walter Devereux; Allen Brodrick	
Sudbury	John Gurdon; Joseph Brand	
=== Surrey ===
Constituency	Members	Notes
Surrey	The Lord Aungier; Daniel Harvey	
Bletchingly	John Goodwin; Sir John Evelyn	
Gatton	Thomas Turgis; Sir Edmund Bowyer	
Guildford	Sir Richard Onslow; Arthur Onslow	
Haslemere	John Westbrooke; Richard West	
Reigate	John Hele; Edward Thurland	
Southwark	John Langham; Thomas Bludworth	
=== Sussex ===
Constituency	Members	Notes
Sussex	Sir Henry Goring, 2nd Baronet; Sir John Pelham, 3rd Baronet	
Arundel	Roger Buyle, Lord Broghill; Henry Cary, 4th Viscount Falkland	Falkland sat for Oxford - replaced by John Trevor
Bramber	John Byne; Edward Eversfield	
Chichester	Henry Peckham; John Farrington	
East Grinstead	Marmaduke Gresham; George Courthope	
Horsham	Thomas Middleton; Hall Ravenscroft	
Lewes	Nizel Rivers; John Stapley	
Midhurst	William Willoughby; John Steward	
New Shoreham	Edward Blaker; Herbert Springet	
Steyning	Sir Henry Goring, 2nd Baronet; John Fagg	Goring sat for Sussex - replaced by John Eversfield
=== Warwickshire ===
Constituency	Members	Notes
Warwickshire	Thomas Archer; George Browne	
Coventry	Robert Beake; Richard Hopkins	
Warwick	Clement Throckmorton; John Rous	
=== Westmorland ===
Constituency	Members	Notes
Westmoreland	Sir John Lowther, 1st Baronet, of Lowther; Thomas Wharton	
Appleby	Henry Cholmley; Christopher Clapham	
=== Wiltshire ===
Constituency	Members	Notes
Wiltshire	John Ernle; Sir Anthony Ashley Cooper	
Calne	Edward Baytun; William Duckett	
Chippenham	Edward Hungerford; Edward Poole	
Cricklade	Hungerford Dunch; Nevil Maskelyne	
Devizes	William Lewis; Robert Aldworth	
Downton	Thomas Fitzjames; William Coles	
Great Bedwyn	Robert Spencer; Thomas Gape	Double return - seated 16 May
Heytesbury	Thomas Moore; John Joliffe	Moore also elected for Lyme Regis
Hindon	George Howe; Sir Thomas Thynne	Double return - Thynne seated 18 May
Ludgershall	William Prynne; William Thomas	Double return - Thomas seated 23 May
Marlborough	Henry Hungerford; Jeffrey Daniel	
Malmesbury	Robert Danvers; Sir Francis Lee, 4th Baronet	
Old Sarum	Seymour Bowman; John Norden	
Salisbury	Henry Eyre; Edward Tooker	
Westbury	Richard Lewis; William Brouncker	
Wilton	Francis Swanton; Richard Howe	
Wootton Bassett	John Pleydell; Henry Somerset	Somerset sat for Monmouthshire - replaced by Sir Baynham Throckmorton, 3rd Baronet
=== Worcestershire ===
Constituency	Members	Notes
Worcestershire	Henry Bromley; John Talbot	
Bewdley	Thomas Foley	
Droitwich	Samuel Sandys; Thomas Coventry	
Evesham	John Egioke; Sir Thomas Rouse, 1st Baronet	
Worcester	Thomas Hall; Thomas Street	
=== Yorkshire ===
Constituency	Members	Notes
Yorkshire	Thomas Lord Fairfax; John Dawnay	
Aldborough	Solomon Swale; Francis Goodricke	
Beverley	Hugh Bethell; Sir John Hotham, 2nd Baronet	Bethell sat for Hedon - replaced by Michael Warton
Boroughbridge	Conyers Darcy; Henry Stapylton	
Hedon	John Cloberry; Hugh Bethell	Cloberry chose to sit for Launceston - replaced by Henry Hildyard
Kingston upon Hull	John Ramsden; Andrew Marvell	
Knaresborough	William Stockdale; Henry Bethell	
Malton	Philip Howard; Thomas Hebblethwaite	
Northallerton	Thomas Lascelles; Francis Lascelles	
Pontefract	William Lowther; Sir George Savile, 4th Baronet	
Richmond	Sir Christopher Wyvill, 3rd Baronet; James Darcy	
Ripon	Edmund Jennings; Henry Arthington	Double return - seated 3 May
Scarborough	Luke Robinson; John Legard	
Thirsk	Barrington Bourchier; William Stanley	Stanley sat for Liverpool - replaced by The Earl of Ancram
York	Sir Thomas Widdrington; Metcalfe Robinson	
=== Cinque Ports ===
Dover	Edward Montagu; Arnold Braemes	
Hastings	Denny Ashburnham; Nicholas Delves	
Hythe	The Viscount Strangford; Phineas Andrews	
Romney	Sir Norton Knatchbull, 1st Baronet; John Knatchbull	
Rye	William Hay; Herbert Morley	
Sandwich	Henry Oxenden; James Thurbarne	
Seaford	Sir Thomas Dyke; George Parker	
Winchelsea	William Howard; Samuel Gott	
=== Wales ===
Constituency	Members	Notes
Anglesey	The Viscount Bulkeley	
Newburgh	Griffith Bodwrda	
Brecknockshire	Sir William Lewis, 1st Baronet	
Brecknock	Sir Henry Williams, 2nd Baronet	
Cardiganshire	Sir Richard Pryse, 2nd Baronet	
Cardigan	James Philipps	
Carmarthenshire	John Lloyd	
Carmarthen	Arthur Annesley	
Carnarvonshire	John Glynne	
Carnarvon	Wiliam Glynne	
Denbighshire	Sir Thomas Myddelton	
Denbigh	John Carter	
Flintshire	Kenrick Eyton	
Flint	Roger Whitley	
Glamorgan	Sir Edward Mansel, 4th Baronet	
Cardiff	Bussy Mansell	
Merioneth	Edmund Meyricke	
Montgomeryshire	John Purcell	
Montgomery	Thomas Myddelton	
Pembrokeshire	Arthur Owen	
Pembroke	Sir Hugh Owen, 1st Baronet	
Haverford West	William Philipps	
Radnorshire	George Gwynne	
Radnor	Robert Harley	

== See also ==
- List of MPs elected to the English parliament in 1659
