= Thomas Stucley (MP) =

English landowner and politician

Sir Thomas Stucley (24 August 1620 – 20 September 1663) of Affeton Castle, Devon was an English landowner and politician who sat in the House of Commons from 1661 to 1663. He fought in the Royalist army in the English Civil War.

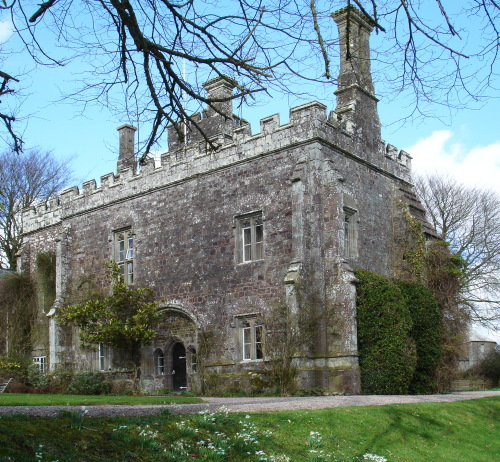
Former gatehouse of Affeton manor house

== Biography ==
Stucley was the eldest son of John Stucley of Affeton, West Worlington, Devon, and his first wife Honor Hals, daughter of Richard Hals of Kennedon, Sherford. He matriculated at Wadham College, Oxford on 19 May 1637, aged 17. In 1638, he succeeded to West Worlinton on the death of his father. He was J.P. for Devon from 1643 to 1646 and was a distinguished soldier in the Royalist army during the Civil War. He was a major of horse from 1643 to 1646 and was a colonel by the time of the surrender of Exeter in that year.

On the Restoration, Stucley was knighted on 27 May 1660. He was reinstated as J.P in June 1660 and became Deputy Lieutenant and commissioner for assessment in August 1660, remaining in those posts until his death. He was captain of horse in the regiment of Francis, Lord Hawley from July to November 1660. In 1661, he was elected Member of Parliament for Tiverton in the Cavalier Parliament. He was commissioner for loyal and indigent officers in 1662 and commissioner for corporations from 1662 to 1663.

Stucley died at the age of 43 and was buried at West Worlington.

Stucley married in about 1642, Elizabeth Sydenham, daughter of Sir Ralph Sydenham of Youlston, and had two sons and four daughters. His sons died young, and his estate eventually went to his brother Lewis Stucley, a "famous independent" preacher.

Parliament of England
Preceded by Robert Shapcote; Henry Newte	Member of Parliament for Tiverton; 1661–1663; With: Thomas Carew	Succeeded by Thomas Carew; Sir Henry Ford
