= Convention Parliament =

The term Convention Parliament has been used to describe the parliaments of:

- Convention Parliament (England), for the English parliaments of 1399, 1660 and 1689
  - Convention Parliament (1399), for the English Convention Parliament of 1399
  - Convention Parliament (1660), for the English Convention Parliament of 1660
  - Convention Parliament (1689) for the English Convention Parliament of 1689–1690
- Irish Convention (1660), sat 2 March and 27 May 1660, and again January 1661
- Convention of Estates of Scotland
