= Convention Parliament (England) =

English parliaments in 1660 and 1689

The Convention Parliament was a parliament in English history which, owing to an abeyance of the Crown, assembled without formal summons by the Sovereign. Sir William Blackstone applied the term to only two English Parliaments, those of 1660 and 1689, but some sources have also applied the name to the parliament of 1399.

== Features of the convention parliaments ==
It is a branch of the royal prerogative, that no parliament shall be convened by its own authority, or by any other authority than that of the sovereign. Where the crown is in abeyance, this prerogative cannot of course be exercised, and the expedient of Convention Parliaments has been resorted to, the enactments of which shall afterwards be ratified by a parliament summoned in accordance with the provisions of the constitution. ... a Convention Parliament [is] the constitutional mode in which the general will of England expresses itself on such questions as cannot be constitutionally discussed in parliament—e.g., a change of the reigning dynasty.

— Chambers's Encyclopaedia (1870)

Blackstone points out that the 1689 parliament had to assemble without a royal writ, because the throne was vacant, and no legally summoned parliament could ever be assembled unless a Convention Parliament met to settle the issue of government.

Between 1660 and 1689 the meaning of the word Convention underwent a revision. In 1660 the word was seen as pejorative with overtones of irregularity, but after the convening of the 1689 parliament some started to see this as a virtue, "a voice of liberty".

The Succession to the Crown Act 1707 and the Meeting of Parliament Act 1797 has made it extremely unlikely that there will be need of another Westminster Convention Parliament:

There is only one occasion on which Parliament meets without a Royal summons, and that is when the Sovereign has died. In such circumstances, the Succession to the Crown Act 1707 provides that, if Parliament is not already sitting, it must immediately meet and sit.

The Meeting of Parliament Act 1797 provides that, if the Sovereign dies after Parliament has been dissolved, the immediately preceding Parliament sits for up to six months, if not prorogued or dissolved before then.

— The official website of the British Monarchy (2016).

== Convention Parliament of 1399 ==
The first example of a convention parliament is the parliament of 1399. In 1399 a convention of estates of the realm assembled to offer the throne to Henry Bolingbroke as King Henry IV of England after the deposition of King Richard II of England. The convention had been summoned as a parliament by a writ issued by Richard, but it had not been opened by his commission as he had been deposed and it was held that this had the same effect on the parliament as the death of a monarch. So once Henry was recognised as King he re-summoned the same parliament hence validating its previous recognition of him as king.

== Convention Parliament of 1660 ==
It was by the letter of the law no true Parliament, because the king did not summon it, on the contrary, it summoned the king. Hence, it is known as the Convention Parliament.

— G. M. Trevelyan, England under the Stuarts (1946), p. 298

The Convention Parliament (25 April 1660 – 29 December 1660) followed the Long Parliament that had finally voted for its own dissolution on 16 March that year. Elected as a "free parliament", i.e. with no oath of allegiance to the Commonwealth or to the monarchy, it was predominantly Royalist in its membership. It assembled for the first time on 25 April 1660.

After the Declaration of Breda had been received, Parliament proclaimed on 8 May that King Charles II had been the lawful monarch since the death of Charles I in January 1649. The Convention Parliament then proceeded to conduct the necessary preparation for the Restoration Settlement. These preparations included the necessary provisions to deal with land and funding such that the new régime could operate.

Reprisals against the establishment which had developed under Oliver Cromwell were constrained under the terms of the Indemnity and Oblivion Act which became law on 29 August 1660. Nonetheless there were prosecutions against those accused of regicide, the direct participation in the trial and execution of Charles I.

The Convention Parliament was dissolved by Charles II on 29 December 1660. The succeeding parliament was elected in May 1661, and was called the Cavalier Parliament. It set about both systematically dismantling of all the legislation and institutions which had been introduced during the Interregnum, and the confirming of the Acts of the Convention Parliament.

As all the acts of the Commonwealth parliaments were obliterated from the legal record, the Convention Parliament replicated some of the legislation they wanted to keep (e.g. the Navigation Act 1651) in new acts.

=== See also ===
List of MPs elected to the English Parliament in 1660

== Convention Parliament of 1689 ==
The Convention Parliament (29 December – 22 January 1689) was the first parliament of the 'Glorious Revolution' of 1688.

This parliament, which met in 1689 after the departure of King James II of England, was not summoned by the King. It decided that the King had abdicated by fleeing the capital and throwing the Great Seal of the Realm in the River Thames. It also offered the throne jointly to King William III and Queen Mary II, formally recognising Prince William of Orange as King by passing the Bill of Rights 1689.

== See also ==
- Constituent Assembly
- Constituent Cortes
- Constitutional convention (political meeting)
- List of parliaments of England
- Revolutionary breach of legal continuity
- List of MPs elected to the English Parliament in 1660
- List of MPs elected to the English Parliament in 1689
