= Henry Newte =

Member of the Parliament of England

Henry Newte the younger (1609 – 20 October 1670) was an English politician who sat in the House of Commons in 1660.

Newte was the eldest son of Henry Newte The Elder Town Clerk of Tiverton, and was baptised in June 1609. He was a student at Lyon's Inn. He succeeded his father as Town Clerk of Tiverton and held that office from 1625 to 1655, he was twice Mayor of Tiverton. In November 1660, he was elected Member of Parliament for Tiverton in a by-election to the Convention Parliament. He was commissioner for assessment for Devon from August 1660 to 1669. He was a J.P. for Tiverton in 1665.

Newte died at the age of 61. He and his wife Alice had one daughter.

Parliament of England
Preceded by Robert Shapcote; Roger Colman	Member of Parliament for Tiverton; 1660; With: Robert Shapcote	Succeeded by Sir Thomas Carew, 1st Baronet; Sir Thomas Stucley
