= HMS Breda =

Five ships of the Royal Navy have borne the name HMS Breda or Bredah, after the Declaration of Breda:

- HMS Breda (1660), a 40-gun Elizabeth-class frigate launched in 1654 as Nantwich, renamed in 1660 and wrecked in 1666.
- HMS Breda (1679), a 70-gun third rate ship of the line launched in 1679 and blown up by accident in 1690.
- HMS Breda (1692), a 70-gun third rate ship of the line launched in 1692, and broken up in 1730.
- HMS Bredah was to have been a 70-gun third rate, but she was renamed HMS Prince of Orange before being launched in 1734.
- HMS Breda, a steam yacht previously named Sapphire and owned by Lord Fairhaven. Sapphire was launched in 1912 and requisitioned by the British Royal Navy in 1939 at the start of World War II and renamed HMS Breda (4.84). She was sunk in 1944 when involved in a collision with a submarine.
