= Sir Thomas Carew, 1st Baronet =

Sir Thomas Carew, 1st Baronet (1632 – September 1673) of Haccombe, Devon, was an English politician who sat in the House of Commons from 1661 to 1674.

== Early life ==
He was baptised on 21 June 1632 and was the eldest son and heir of Thomas Carew (d. 1656) of Haccombe by his wife, Anna Clifford (d. 1656), daughter of the Rev John Clifford of Ugbrooke.

== Career ==
In 1649 he was admitted at the Middle Temple. He matriculated at Exeter College, Oxford on 12 November 1650 and was awarded BA on 11 February 1653 and MA on 28 June 1655. He succeeded to the estate at Haccombe on the death of his father on 6 December 1656.

Carew was created baronet on 2 August 1661. In 1661 he was elected Member of Parliament for Tiverton in the Cavalier Parliament and sat until his death in 1674.

== Marriages and children ==
Carew married firstly in or before 1653 to Elizabeth Carew, daughter of Sir Henry Carew of Bickleigh Castle, near Tiverton by his wife, Dorothy Mohun, daughter of Sir Reginald Mohun of Cornwall. They had six children. He married, secondly, by licence dated 20 June 1672, Martha Duck (d. 1674), widow of Nicholas Duck (1630–1667) of Mount Radford, Exeter and daughter and co-heiress of Arthur Duck, MP for Minehead.

Parliament of England
Preceded by Robert Shapcote; Henry Newte	Member of Parliament for Tiverton; 1661–1674; With: Sir Thomas Stucley	Succeeded by Sir Henry Ford
Baronetage of England
New creation	Baronet (of Haccombe); 1661–1673	Succeeded by Henry Carew
