= Francis Warner =

English politician

Francis Warner (died 3 April 1667) was an English merchant and politician who sat in the House of Commons in 1659.

Warner was a city of London merchant and a member of the Worshipful Company of Leathersellers. On 25 February 1658, he was elected an alderman of the city of London for the Bridge ward. He was master of the Leathersellers Company for 1658 to 1659. In 1659, he was Sheriff of the City of London, and was President of St. Thomas' Hospital from 1659 to 1660.

In 1659, Warner was elected Member of Parliament for Tiverton in the Third Protectorate Parliament.

Parliament of England
| Preceded by Robert Shapcote | Member of Parliament for Tiverton; 1660; With: Sir Coplestone Bampfylde, 2nd Baronet | Succeeded by Not represented in restored Rump |
