= William Stanley (1640–1670) =

English politician

William Stanley (18 October 1640 – 25 October 1670) of Knowsley, Lancashire was an English politician who sat in the House of Commons from 1660 to 1670.

Stanley was the 3rd surviving son of James Stanley, 7th Earl of Derby and educated privately.

In April 1660, he was elected Member of Parliament for Liverpool in the Convention Parliament. He was active in the restoration of Charles II of England.

In 1661, he was re-elected MP for Liverpool for the Cavalier Parliament and in 1662 elected Mayor of Liverpool.

He died unmarried and was buried in the Derby chapel of Church of St Peter and St Paul, Ormskirk.
