= Henry Ford (Tiverton MP) =

English politician

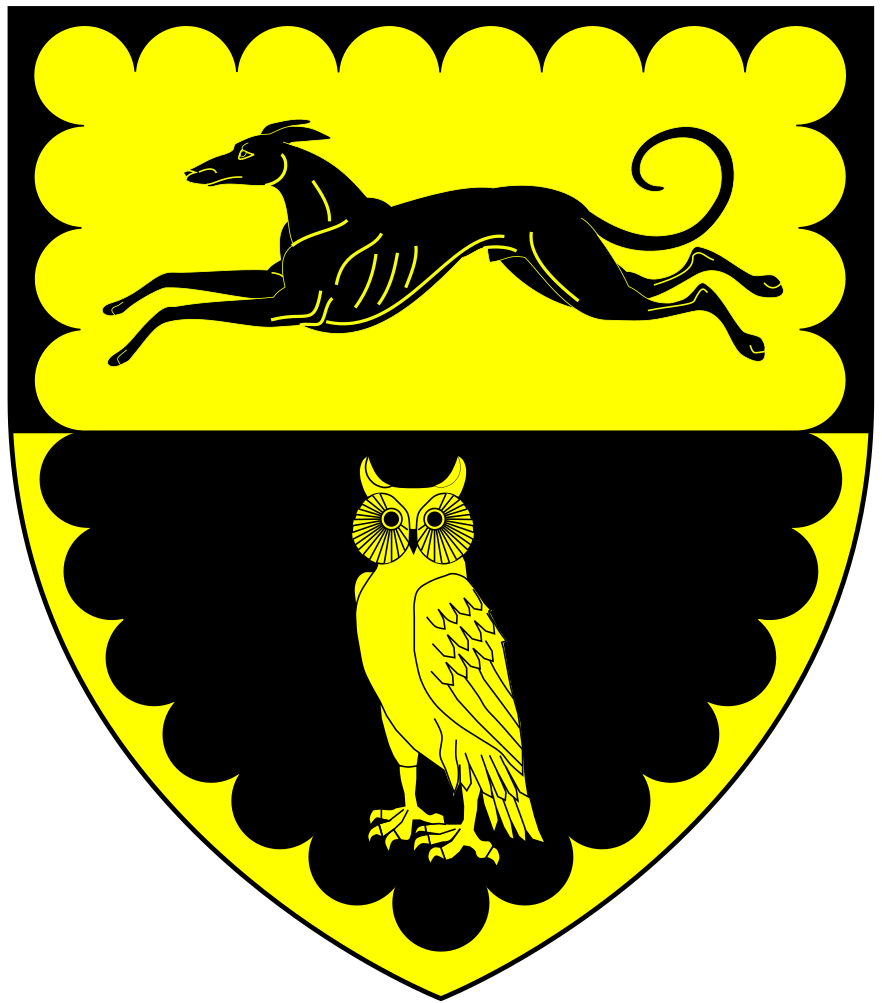
Arms of Ford of Nutwell: Party per fesse or and sable, in chief a greyhound courant in base an owl within a bordure engrailed all counter-changed

Sir Henry Ford (January 1617 – 1684), of Nutwell in Devon was four times MP for Tiverton between 1664 and 1685 and twice Secretary to the Lord Lieutenant of Ireland, 1669–70 and 1672–73.

== Origins ==
Ford was the eldest son of Henry Ford (d.1616) of Bagtor in the parish of Ilsington, Devon by his wife Katharine Drake, daughter and sole heiress of George Drake of Spratshays in Littleham, Devon. His grandfather was Thomas Ford (1556–1610) of Bagtor in the parish of Ilsington, by his wife Elizabeth Popham (d.1629) of the Popham family of Huntworth in Somerset. Her monument exists in Ilsington Church. Thomas Ford's grandfather was John Ford (d.1538) of Ashburton (the son and heir of William Ford of Chagford,) who purchased the estate of Bagtor in the parish of Ilsington, which his male heirs successively made their seat. The Elizabethan mansion of the Fords survives today at Bagtor as the service wing of a later house appended in about 1700. Sir Henry Ford was a nephew of the dramatist John Ford (1586-c.1639)

== Early life ==
Henry Ford was born in January 1617 and was baptised at Littleham on 19 January 1617, four months after his father's death in September 1616. His mother remarried five years later in 1621 to John Clobery. Henry matriculated at Exeter College, Oxford on 21 November 1634 aged 17, and went home to look after his inheritance.

== Parliamentary career ==
In April 1660 Ford was elected Member of Parliament for Lostwithiel in the Convention Parliament, but his election was declared void on 5 May. He purchased Nutwell Court, in Woodbury, near Exeter, which he made his home. He was put in the Commission of the Peace for the county, and was lieutenant-colonel in the militia for the eastern division of the shire, of which he was likewise a deputy-lieutenant. He was elected a fellow of the Royal Society in 1663 On 6 April 1664 he was elected MP for Tiverton in a by-election to the Cavalier Parliament. In 1669 he accompanied John, lord Robartes, the lord-lieutenant, to Ireland as secretary of state, but 'to his no little damage and disappointment' was recalled along with his chief the very next year. In 1672 Ford, having been knighted at Whitehall on 20 July in that year, served in the same capacity for Arthur Capel, 1st Earl of Essex. He did not, however, continue in office long, 'for being sent into England on some important affair, contrived by those who were willing to put him out of the way, he returned no more unto Ireland'. The fact was that his brusque, overbearing manner made him everywhere disliked. He was re-elected MP for Tiverton in the two elections of 1679 and in 1681.

Ford died in 1684, aged 65, at Nutwell Court, and was buried in Woodbury Church.

== Family ==
Ford left a son Charles, supposed to have died in his minority, and three daughters, married to Drake, Holwell, and Egerton.

Parliament of England
Preceded by Thomas Carew; Sir Thomas Stucley	Member of Parliament for Tiverton; 1664–1685; With: Sir Thomas Carew, 1st Baronet 1664–1673; Samuel Foote 1673–1685	Succeeded by Sir Hugh Acland, 5th Baronet; William Colman
Political offices
Preceded by Thomas Page	Chief Secretary for Ireland; 1669–1670	Succeeded by Ellis Leighton
Preceded by Ellis Leighton	Chief Secretary for Ireland; 1672–1673	Succeeded by William Harbord
