= Roger Colman =

English politician

Roger Colman (c. 1623 – 1660) was an English landowner and politician who sat in the House of Commons in 1660.

Colman was the eldest son of Francis Colman of Gornhay, Tiverton, Devon and his wife Bridget Cruwys, daughter of Lewis Cruwys of Cruwys Morchard. He matriculated at Exeter College, Oxford on 9 April 1641, aged 18. In 1650 he succeeded to Gorhnay on the death of his father. He was commissioner for assessment for Devon in 1657. In July 1660, he was elected Member of Parliament for Tiverton in a by-election to the Convention Parliament.

Colman died at the age of about 37 between 27 October 1660 when he wrote his will and 10 November when it was proved.

Colman married Elizabeth Drewe, daughter of William Drewe of The Grange, Broadhembury and had a son and four daughters.

Parliament of England
Preceded by Robert Shapcote; Thomas Bampfylde	Member of Parliament for Tiverton; 1660; With: Robert Shapcote	Succeeded by Henry Newte; Robert Shapcote
