= Edmund Petty =

Edmund Petty (circa 1621 – 1661) was an English lawyer and politician who served as a Member of Parliament in the House of Commons in 1660.

== Biography ==
Petty was the son of Maximilian Petty from Thame, Oxfordshire, and his first wife, Elizabeth Waller, the daughter of Robert Waller of Beaconsfield. He matriculated at Oriel College, Oxford, at the age of 15 on January 22, 1636. In 1637, he entered Lincoln's Inn and was called to the bar in 1644.

By 1651, he had become the recorder of Wycombe. In 1660, Petty was elected as the Member of Parliament for Wycombe during the Convention Parliament. He spoke only once during his time in Parliament and was not re-elected in 1661.

Petty died at around the age of 40 and was buried in Wycombe. He married Frances and had a son and three daughters.
