= Declaration of Breda =

1660 proclamation by King Charles II of England

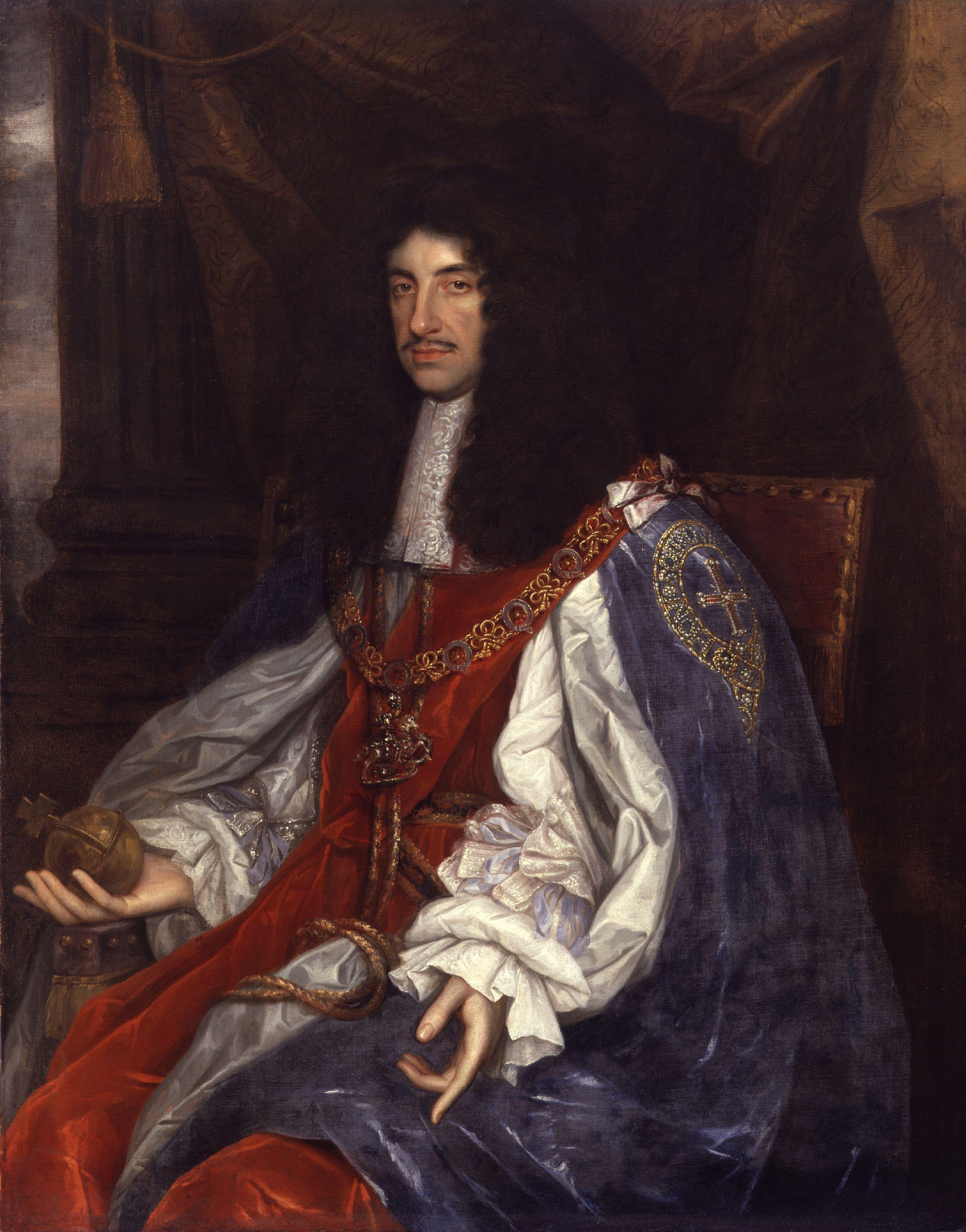
Charles II, who issued the proclamation

The Declaration of Breda (dated 4 April 1660) was a proclamation by Charles II of England in which he promised a general pardon for crimes committed during the English Civil War and the Interregnum for all those who recognised Charles as the lawful king; the retention by the current owners of property purchased during the same period; religious toleration; and the payment of arrears to members of the army, and that the army would be recommissioned into service under the crown. Further, regarding the two latter points, the parliament was given the authority to judge property disputes and responsibility for the payment of the army. The first three pledges were all subject to amendment by acts of Parliament.

== Background ==
The declaration was written in response to a secret message sent by General George Monck, who was then in effective control of England. On 1 May 1660, the contents of the declaration and accompanying letters were made public. The next day Parliament passed a resolution that "government ought to be by King, Lords and Commons" and Charles was invited to England to receive his crown. On 8 May Charles was proclaimed King. On the advice of Monck, the Commons rejected a resolution put forward by jurist Matthew Hale (a member for Gloucestershire) for a committee to be formed to look into the concessions offered by Charles and to negotiate conditions with the King such as those put forward to his father in the treaty of Newport.

The declaration was named after the city of Breda in the Netherlands. It was actually written in the Spanish Netherlands, where Charles had been residing since March 1656; however, at the time of writing, England had been at war with Spain since 1655. To overcome the difficulties, both practical and in terms of public relations, of a prospective King of England addressing his subjects from enemy territory, Monck advised Charles to relocate himself to the United Netherlands, and to date his letters as if they were posted from Breda. Charles left Brussels, his last residence in the Spanish Netherlands, and passing through Antwerp arrived in Breda on 4 April, and resided there until 14 May. Then he travelled to The Hague, where he was received by the States General of the Netherlands as a ruling King of England and grandiosely entertained, and departed for England on 2 June from Scheveningen on HMS Royal Charles, the former Naseby which was renamed on arrival at the Dutch coast. The declaration, however (actually several letters, addressed to Monck, the Houses of Parliament, and the City of London), was despatched as soon as Charles had crossed the border of the Dutch Republic, and was dated 4 April (OS)/14 April (NS).

== Contents ==
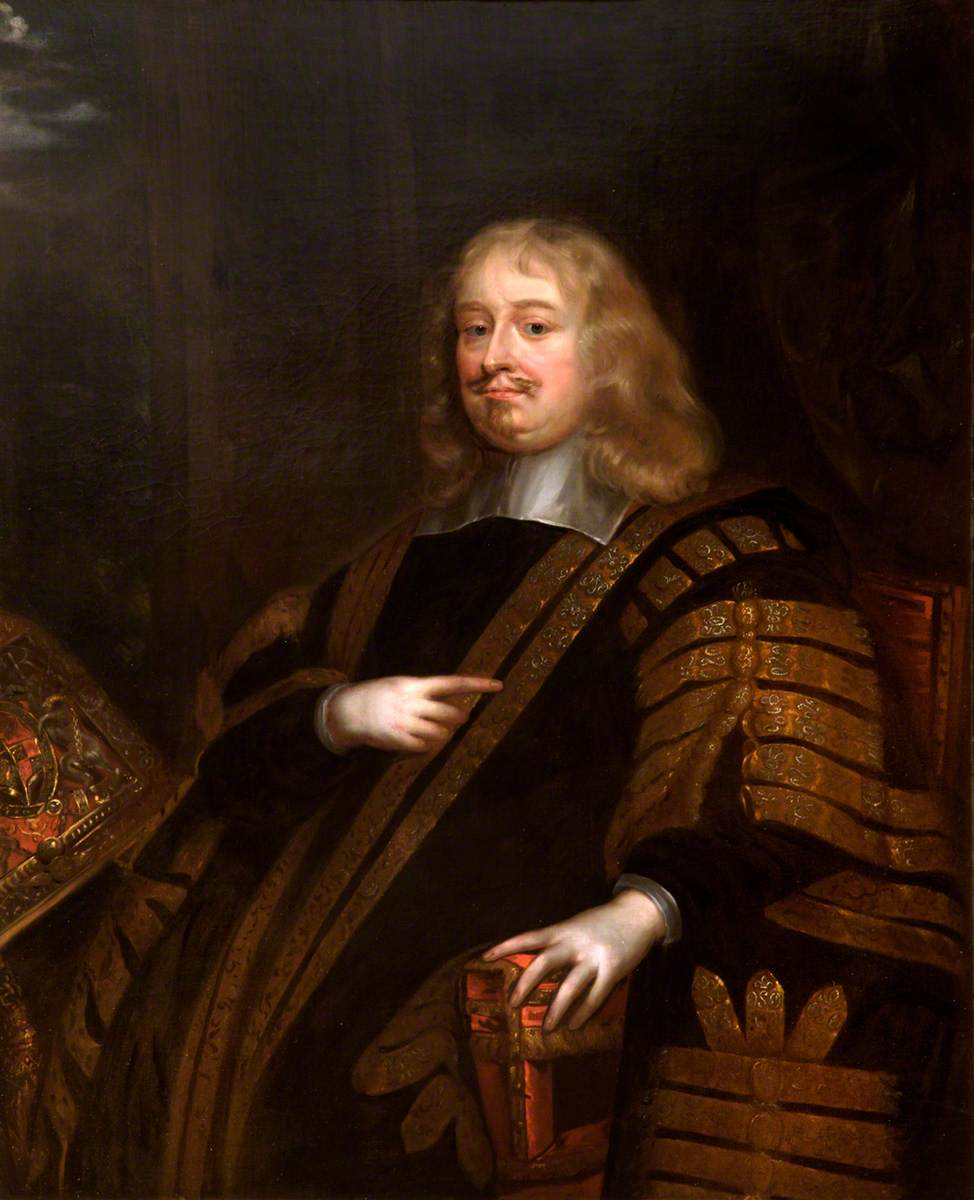
Edward Hyde, who played a major role in the proclamation's drafting and implementation

The declaration was drawn up by Charles and his three chief advisors, Edward Hyde, James Butler and Nicholas Monck, (Note: Nicholas Monck was a clergyman and brother of General George Monck, who carried letters between his brother and Charles II.) in order to state the terms by which Charles hoped to take up "the possession of that right which God and Nature hath made our due".

The declaration promised a "free and general pardon" to any old enemies of Charles and of his father who recognised Charles II as their lawful monarch, "excepting only such persons as shall hereafter be excepted by parliament". However it had always been Charles's expectation, or at least that of Hyde, that all who had been closely involved in his father's death should be punished, and even while at a disadvantage, while professing pardon and favour to many, he had constantly excepted the regicides of Charles I. Once Charles was restored to the throne, on his behalf Hyde steered the Indemnity and Oblivion Act through Parliament. The act pardoned most who had sided with Parliament during the Civil War, but excepted the regicides, two prominent unrepentant republicans (John Lambert and Henry Vane the Younger), and around another 20 men; all of whom were forbidden to take any public office or sit in Parliament.

In the declaration Charles promised religious toleration in areas where it did not disturb the peace of the kingdom, and an act of Parliament for the "granting of that indulgence". However Parliament chose to interpret the threat of peace to the kingdom to include the holding of public office by non-Anglicans. Between 1660 and 1665 the Cavalier Parliament passed four statutes that became known as the Clarendon Code. These severely limited the rights of Roman Catholics and nonconformists, such as the Puritans who had reached the zenith of their influence under the Commonwealth, effectively excluding them from national and local politics.

The declaration undertook to settle the back-pay of General Monck's soldiers. The landed classes were reassured that establishing the justice of contested grants and purchases of estates that had been made "in the continued distractions of so many years and so many and great revolutions" was to be determined in Parliament. Charles II appeared to have "offered something to everyone in his terms for resuming government". Copies of the Declaration were delivered to both houses of the Convention Parliament by John Grenville. Other copies with separate covering letters were delivered to Lord General George Monck to be communicated to the Lord President of the Council of State and to the Officers of the Army under his command, and to the Generals of the "Navy at Sea" and to the Lord Mayor of London.

=== Commemoration ===
Several warships of the Royal Navy would later be named HMS Breda after the declaration.

== Notes ==
=== References ===
- Lister, Thomas Henry (1838). Life and administration of Edward, first Earl of Clarendon: with original correspondence, and authentic papers never before published. Longman, Orme, Brown, Green, and Longmans.
- Hostettler, John (2002). The Red Gown: The Life and Works of Sir Matthew Hale. Chichester: Barry Rose Law Publishers. ISBN 1-902681-28-2.
- Hallam, Henry (1859). The constitutional history of England, from the accession of Henry VII. to the death of George II. Harper.
- Hutton, Ronald (2000). The British Republic 1649–1660. 2nd Edition Macmillan. ISBN 978-0-333-91324-6.

=== External links ===
- April 4, 1660. Old Parliamentary History, xxii. 238. See Masson's Life of Milton, v. 697
- The Declaration of Breda, as printed in the Journals of the House of Lords, Volume 11, p. 7–8
- The Parliamentary Archives holds the original of this historic record
