= Robert Shapcote =

English lawyer and Member of Parliament

Robert Shapcote, JP (born 1621, died 1689) was an English lawyer from Devon and four times Member of Parliament for Tiverton in 1646–1649, 1654, 1656 and 1660. He sat in the Irish House of Commons for the borough of Wicklow from 1661 to 1665 and was Solicitor-General for Ireland and twice briefly Attorney-General for Ireland. He fought in the Parliamentary army in the Civil War.

Shapcote was the eldest son of Henry Shapcote of Bradninch and his first wife Wilmot Hill, and was baptised on 4 February 1621. He entered Lincoln's Inn in 1638 and was called to the bar in 1645. From 1644 to 1646, he was a colonel in the Parliamentary army. He was elected Member of Parliament for Tiverton for the Long Parliament on 7 December 1646 but was excluded in 1649 under Pride's Purge.

Shapcote became Recorder of Tiverton by 1647 and was also recorder of Bradninch and South Molton. He was J.P. for Devon from 1647 to 1649. In 1654, he was elected MP for Tiverton in the First Protectorate Parliament. He became commissioner for militia for Devon and commissioner for oyer and terminer on the Western circuit in 1655.

In 1656, he was re-elected MP for Tiverton for the Second Protectorate Parliament. Also in 1656, he became commissioner for security, commissioner for assessment for Devon, and commissioner for fraudulent debentures and Solicitor-General for Ireland. He became commissioner for new buildings in London in 1657.

In 1659, he was unsuccessful in his attempt to be re-elected MP for Tiverton in a double return. He became Attorney-General for Ireland in March 1659, was deprived of this position when the Rump Parliament was restored in May 1659, was restored to it when the secluded members were allowed in in February 1660 and vacated it again in May 1660.

In April 1660, he was elected MP for Tiverton again for the Convention Parliament in which he was very active, being particularly concerned with Irish matters, and with the religious settlement. He opposed the unconditional restoration of the Church of England hierarchy. remarking that "I am not against the Bishops, but their power".

In 1661, Shapcote went back to Ireland to practice law. A tentative offer of a renewal of Government employment was politely refused. He stood for three constituencies in the 1661 Irish parliament, and was elected for the borough of Wicklow. He was highly regarded by the Cromwellians in Ireland, whereas Royalists denounced him as "a great fanatic" and the leader of "the seditious faction". There is no doubt that he had a following in the Commons, although the extent of his influence has been disputed. Captain Blood consulted him on the plan to attack Dublin Castle in 1663, which Shapcote discouraged. However, he was arrested, and it was proposed to try him for treason as an example. The Law Officers advised that it would be very difficult to secure a conviction, and it was decided to simply leave him in prison for the time being. After a year's imprisonment, on the intercession of Sir Courtenay Pole, 2nd Baronet, who had married his cousin, he was pardoned and released, but was expelled from the Irish parliament. He continued with his legal practice in Ireland, but took no further part in politics.

== Marriage and children ==
On 15 May 1646 Shapcote married Anne Walrond, a daughter of Henry II Walrond (1584–1650) of Bradfield House, Uffculme, Devon. He had a son who apparently died young and a daughter Urith, who married her cousin Francis but had no children.

== Death ==
Shapcote died before 3 May 1689, but the exact date is unknown.

Parliament of England
| Preceded by Peter Sainthill; George Hartnall | Member of Parliament for Tiverton; 1646–1648; With: John Elford | Succeeded by Not represented in Rump Parliament |
| Preceded by Not represented in Barebones Parliament | Member of Parliament for Tiverton; 1654–1656 | Succeeded by Francis Warner; Sir Coplestone Bampfylde, 2nd Baronet |
| Preceded by Not represented in Restored Rump | Member of Parliament for Tiverton; 1660; With: Thomas Bampfield | Succeeded by Thomas Bampfield; Roger Colman |
Legal offices
| Preceded by William Ellis | Solicitor-General for Ireland; 1658–1660 | Succeeded by Sir John Temple |
| Preceded by William Basil | Attorney-General for Ireland; 1660 | Succeeded by Sir William Domville |
