= North Cornwall by-election =

North Cornwall by-election may refer to:

- 1932 North Cornwall by-election
- 1939 North Cornwall by-election
