= 1990 Prime Minister's Resignation Honours =

British government recognitions

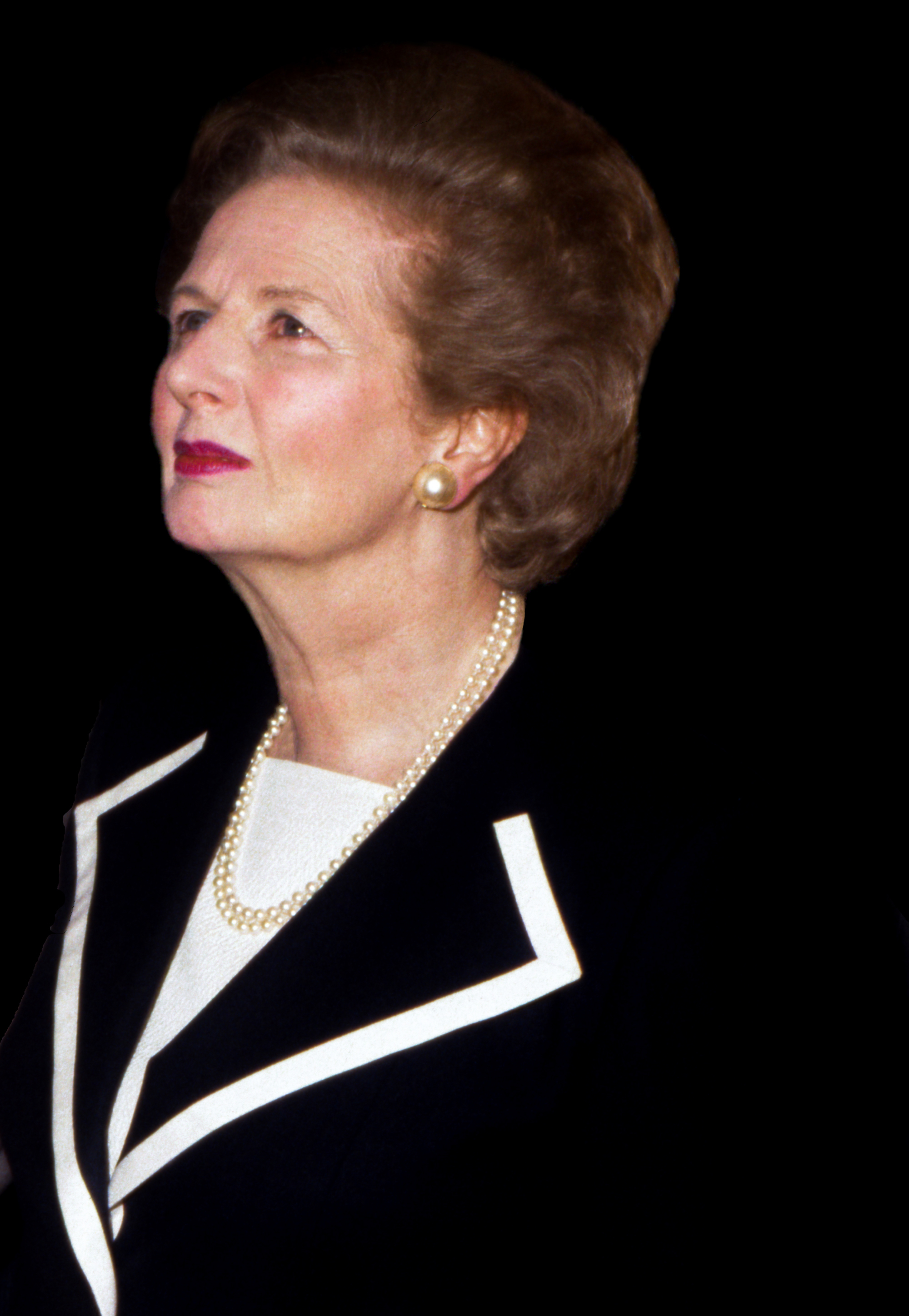
Margaret Thatcher in 1990

The 1990 Prime Minister's Resignation Honours were officially announced in The London Gazette of 21 December 1990 and marked the resignation of the Prime Minister, Margaret Thatcher, who had stepped down from the role in November that year after more than 11 years in office and nearly 16 years as Leader of the Conservative Party.

== Life Peers ==
- Dame Joan Anna Dalziel Seccombe, DBE, Vice-Chairman, Conservative Party.
- Professor Brian Griffiths, Special Adviser to the Right Honourable Margaret Thatcher, O.M., F.R.S., M.P., and Head of Policy Unit.
- Sir Hector Laing, Life President, United Biscuits
- Peter Garth Palumbo, chairman, Arts Council of Great Britain.
- Sir Jeffrey (Maurice) Sterling, CBE, chairman, P&O, Vice Chairman and Chairman of the Executive, Motability.
- Sir (Vincent) Gordon (Lindsay) White, KBE, chairman, Hanson Industries.
- Sir David Wolfson, chairman, Haigside Ltd.

== Knights Bachelor ==
- Timothy John Leigh Bell, Deputy Chairman, Lowe Bell Communications.
- George Arthur Gardiner, MP, Member of Parliament for Reigate.
- Bernard Ingham, formerly Chief Press Secretary, 10 Downing Street.
- Geoffrey Norman Leigh, chairman, Allied London Properties plc.
- Nicholas Markley Lloyd, editor, Daily Express.
- The Rt. Hon. Peter Hugh Morrison, MP, Member of Parliament for the City of Chester. Deputy Chairman, Conservative Party 1986–1989. Lately Parliamentary Private Secretary, 10 Downing Street.
- Gerrard Anthony Neale, MP, Member of Parliament for North Cornwall.
- Michael Jon Neubert, MP, Member of Parliament for Romford. Formerly Parliamentary Under-Secretary of State for the Armed Forces.

== Order of the Bath ==
=== Companions (CB) ===
- Andrew Turnbull, Principal Private Secretary, Prime Minister's Office, 10 Downing Street.

== Order of St Michael and St George ==
=== Knights Commander (KCMG) ===
- Charles David Powell, Private Secretary, Prime Minister's Office, 10 Downing Street.

== Order of the British Empire ==
=== Dames Commander (DBE) ===
- Jane Elizabeth Gow, for political and public service.
- Sue Tinson, associate editor, Independent Television News.

=== Commanders (CBE) ===
- John Robin Catford, Secretary for Appointments, Prime Minister's Office, 10 Downing Street.
- Joan Valerie Hall, Member Council, University College of Buckingham. Formerly Member of Parliament for Keighley 1970–1974.
- Dr. John Henderson, Personal Physician to Margaret Thatcher
- Brian Hitchen, editor, Daily Star.
- Olga Polizzi, member, Westminster City Council.
- (John) Harvey Noake Thomas, International Public Relations Consultant: Consultant Director of Presentation and Promotion, Conservative Party.

=== Officers (OBE) ===
- Marjorie Sherman. For charitable services.
- Christine Margaret Wall, Head of News Department, Conservative Central Office.
- John Flasby Lawrance Whittingdale, formerly Political Secretary; Prime Minister's Office, 10 Downing Street.

=== Members (MBE) ===
- Jean Dibblin, Senior Personal Secretary, Prime Minister's Office, 10 Downing Street.
- Susan Irene Goodchild, Invitations Secretary, Prime Minister's Office, 10 Downing Street.
- Dorothy Haynes, Curator/Housekeeper at Chequers.
- Margaret King, Fashion Director, Aquascutum Ltd.
- Robert Kingston, Personal Detective to Margaret Thatcher
- Amanda Ponsonby, formerly Personal Assistant to Margaret Thatcher
- Janice Kay Richards, Head of Garden Rooms, Prime Minister's Office, 10 Downing Street.
- Sherry Dorelia Warner, Senior Cook, Prime Minister's Office, 10 Downing Street.

== British Empire Medal (BEM) ==
- Edwina Mary Booker, Cleaner, Prime Minister's Office, 10 Downing Street.
- Alma Dew, Telephonist, Prime Minister's Office, 10 Downing Street.
- Sergeant Theresa Maria Duda, Women's Royal Air Force. Assistant House Manager at Chequers.
- Peter Paul D'Emanuele, Messenger, Prime Minister's Office, 10 Downing Street.
- Alfred George Frederick Heath, Custody Guard Supervisor, Prime Minister's Office, 10 Downing Street.
- Doris Agnes King, Messenger. Prime Minister's Office, 10 Downing Street.
- Anthony James Robert Yandle, Deputy House Manager, Prime Minister's Office, 10 Downing Street.
