= Ewen Maclean =

British physician

Professor Sir Ewen Maclean FRSE FRCP FRCS JP
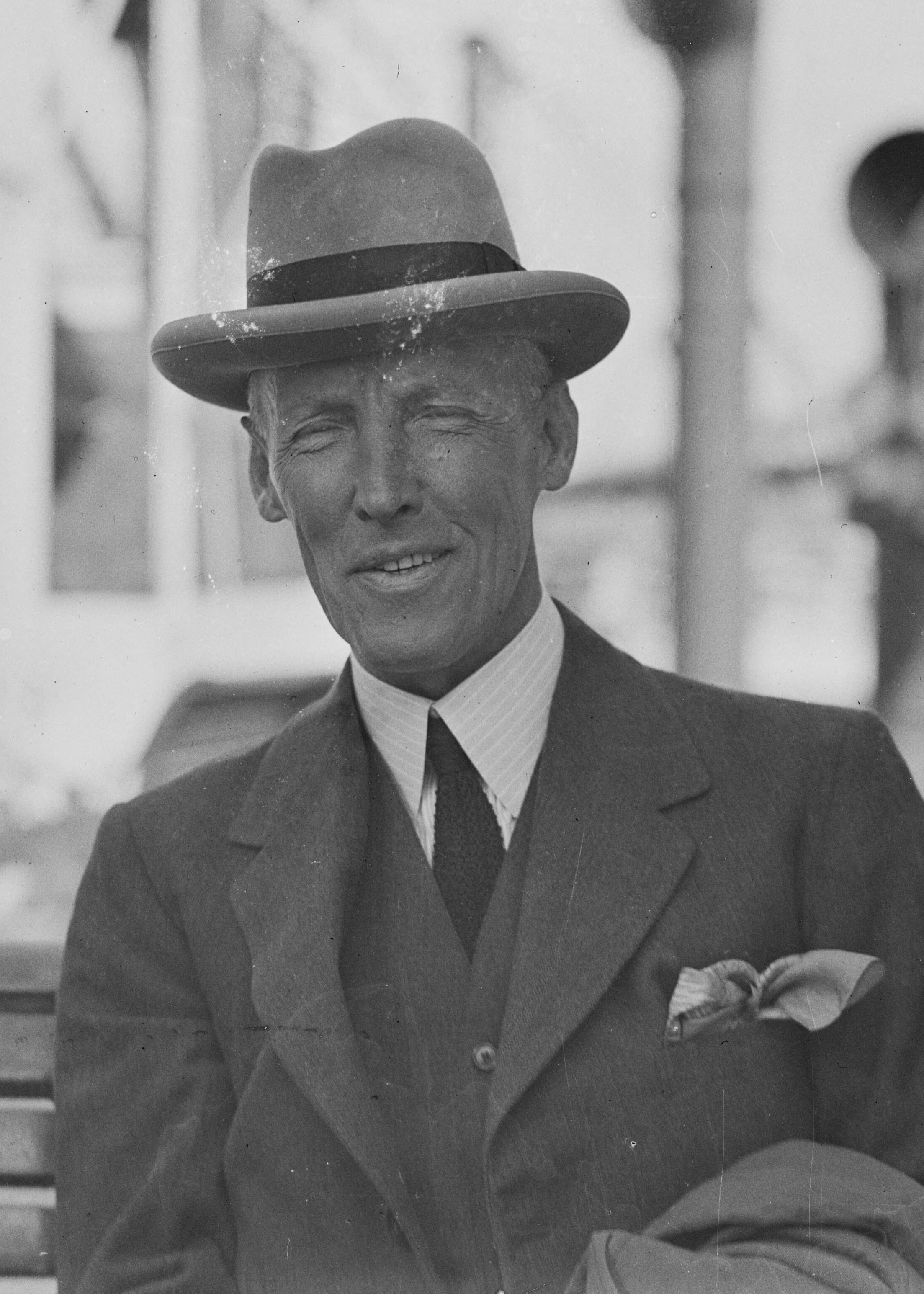
- Maclean in New South Wales, Australia, c. 1929
- Born: Ewen John Maclean; 15 October 1865; Tiree, Scotland
- Died: 13 October 1953 (aged 87); Cardiff, Wales
- Education: University of Edinburgh
- Occupation: Professor of obstetrics and gynaecology
- Relatives: Donald Maclean (brother)

Sir Ewen John Maclean (15 October 1865 – 13 October 1953) was a British physician, who was the first Professor of Obstetrics and Gynaecology at the Welsh National School of Medicine.

== Early life ==
Maclean was born on 15 October 1865 on the island of Tiree, the second son of Agnes Macmillan and John Maclean of Kilmoluag. His father was a "master cordwainer" (shoemaker). The family were Gaelic speakers. His older brother was the politician, Donald Maclean. Around 1870 the family moved to Haverfordwest in Wales, where he was educated, before attending Carmarthen Grammar School. He then studied medicine at the University of Edinburgh, graduating with an MB CM with honours in 1889. In 1891, he received his MD with honours from the University.

== Career ==
From 1889, Maclean worked in the Bristol Hospital for Women and Children as a houseman. He then moved to Chelsea Hospital for Women in London, and began his specialisations in obstetrics and gynaecology. In 1898 he was elected a Fellow of the Royal Society of Edinburgh. His proposers were Sir Alexander Russell Simpson, Sir Thomas Grainger Stewart, Sir German Sims Woodhead and Robert Halliday Gunning.

In 1901 he returned to Wales as Senior Gynaecologist at Cardiff Hospital. In 1911 the hospital was renamed King Edward VII Hospital. He concurrently taught midwifery at the Cardiff Medical School which was set up in response to the Midwives Act 1902.

In the First World War he served as a Lt Colonel in the Royal Army Medical Corps but purely based in Britain, treating soldiers returned from the front first at Eaton Hall, Cheshire (converted to a hospital for officers for the duration of the war) then at the 3rd Western General Hospital.

On his return to Cardiff he was promoted to 'Professor Extraordinary' in 1921, having supported the integration of a Cardiff clinical school with the King Edward VII Hospital. This new role placed Ewen as part-time chair in obstetrics and gynaecology at the hospital. However tensions between academic, hospital and clinical staff following the establishment of clinical teaching in the hospital lead to the suspension of the scheme for a year in the 1920s. Maclean was able to avoid the controversy which other professors of medicine failed to escape, partly due to is reputation as a courteous and kind man. His respect of his colleagues helped gain him the eventual promotion to vice-chairman of the Medical Board of the Hospital.

Maclean's department became notable within the hospital for its progressive approaches to teaching; Maclean was thus frequently sought by the Central Midwives' board to be an examiner in women's diseases and midwifery. He also made a number of notable contributions as a researcher, submitting his research to journals such as British Medical Journal and the Journal of Obstetrics and Gynaecology. Consequently, he created the Ewen Maclean Research Scholarship in 1926, donating £3,000 to promote research in midwifery at the medical school.

During this period he was assisted by Dr Gilbert Strachan, who later became a reputable researcher himself. Maclean relied upon the assistance of such colleagues in order to maintain a busy career as a part-time professor and doctor in a private clinical practice. He was additionally a member of the Welsh Consultative Council of Medical and Allied Services in Wales upon its creation in 1919, created to rebuild the health service following the First World War.

However, the Council was terminated in 1926 over disputes between the Minister of Health and the Council over the restructuring of the Welsh health service. Nonetheless, Professor Maclean's work with this Council contributed to his being knighted by King George V in the 1923 Birthday Honours.

He served the Welsh National School of Medicine for 10 years before retiring in 1931. In the years 1935-1938, he served as president of the British College of Obstetricians. He also became a Fellow of the Royal College of Physicians in 1922, was made an Honorary Fellow of the American College of Surgeons in 1926 and, in 1947, of the Royal College of Obstetricians and Gynaecologists.

He received honorary doctorates from the Universities of Edinburgh, Manchester, Melbourne and Wales. In his final role before his death, he served on the Board of Governors of the United Cardiff Hospitals, appointed in 1948 alongside the creation of the NHS.

== Involvement with the British Medical Association ==
Maclean was heavily involved with the British Medical Association between 1904-1931. In 1906-1913, he was the Cardiff division's representative on the BMA Association's Representative Body, being honorary secretary of this division 1904-1907.

In 1911, he was chairman of the Body and was therefore involved in disputes between the BMA and the Liberal government as a result of the National Insurance Act, disliked by many doctors. Given that his brother, Donald Maclean, was a Liberal MP and supporter of David Lloyd George at this time, Professor Maclean's suitability for involvement in government negotiations was questioned by some as he was deemed too submissive by some.

He consequently left his role as chairman of the Body, with the Association's interests in mind. Though he was missing from the centre of the BMA for a time, Maclean nevertheless was voted president of the Association at its meeting held in Cardiff in 1928.

== Death ==
He died in Cardiff on 13 October 1953, two days before his 88th birthday. He never married; his sister Agnes cared for him until his death. His funeral service took place at Windsor Place Presbyterian Church in Cardiff and he is buried in the family grave at Llangunnor Churchyard near Carmarthen.

== Sources ==
- Alun Roberts, The Welsh National School of Medicine,1893-1931: The Cardiff Years, 2008;
- Who's who in Wales, 3rd Edition (1937);
- The Times, 14 Oct. 1953;
- British Medical Journal, 24 Oct. 1953;
- The Lancet, 24 and 31 Oct. 1953.
