= Midlothian and Peebles =

Parliamentary constituency in the United Kingdom, 1950–1955

- Former county constituency for the House of Commons

1950–1955
- Seats: One
- Created from: Midlothian & Peebles Northern; Peebles & Southern
- Replaced by: Midlothian; Roxburgh, Selkirk and Peebles

Midlothian and Peebles was a short-lived county constituency represented in the House of Commons of the Parliament of the United Kingdom from 1950 until 1955. It was formed by a merger of parts of the old Midlothian and Peebles Northern and Peebles and Southern constituencies. It was reunited in 1955 to form Midlothian.

== Boundaries ==
For its short existence, Midlothian and Peebles covered the counties of Midlothian and Peebles inclusive of all the burghs situated therein except the county of the city of Edinburgh and the burgh of Musselburgh.

== Members of Parliament ==
Elected	Member	Party
1950	David Johnstone Pryde	Labour
1951	David Johnstone Pryde	Labour

== Election results ==
=== Elections in the 1950s ===
General election 1950: Midlothian and Peebles
Party	Candidate	Votes	%	±%
Labour	David Pryde	26,966	52.8	
Unionist	Florence Horsbrugh	19,778	38.7	
Liberal	William Gilmour	4,365	8.5	
Majority		7,188	14.1	
Turnout		51,109	82.9	
Labour win (new seat)				

General election 1951: Midlothian and Peebles
Party	Candidate	Votes	%	±%
Labour	David Pryde	29,271	55.3	+2.5
Unionist	Anthony Stodart	23,681	44.7	+6.0
Majority		5,590	10.6	−3.5
Turnout		52,952	83.8	+0.9
Labour hold		Swing		
