= Peebles and Southern Midlothian =

Parliamentary constituency in the United Kingdom, 1918–1950

- Former county constituency for the House of Commons

1918–1950
- Seats: One
- Created from: Peebles & Selkirk; Midlothian
- Replaced by: Midlothian and Peebles

Peebles and Southern Midlothian was a county constituency of the House of Commons of the Parliament of the United Kingdom (Westminster) from 1918 to 1950. It elected one Member of Parliament (MP) by the first past the post voting system.

== Boundaries ==
The Peebles and Southern Midlothian constituency was described in the Representation of the People Act 1918 as comprising:

The county of Peebles with all the burghs situated therein, and the Gala Water and Lasswade County Districts of Midlothian (except that part of the latter district which is included in the Northern Division) with all burghs situated therein except the burghs of Leith and Musselburgh.

Until 1918 the area of the constituency was, at least nominally, partly within the Peebles and Selkirk constituency and partly within the Midlothian constituency.

When the constituency was abolished in 1950 the Midlothian and Peeblesshire constituency was created.

== Members of Parliament ==
Election	Member	Party
1918	Sir Donald Maclean; Previously MP for Peebles and Selkirk	Liberal
1922	Joseph Westwood	Labour
1923	Joseph Westwood	Labour
1924	Joseph Westwood	Labour
1929	Joseph Westwood	Labour
1931	Archibald Maule Ramsay; Interned under Defence Regulation 18B in 1940 on suspicion of being a Nazi sympathiser	Unionist
1935	Archibald Maule Ramsay; Interned under Defence Regulation 18B in 1940 on suspicion of being a Nazi sympathiser	Unionist
1945	David Pryde; Subsequently member for Midlothian and Peebles	Labour
1950	constituency abolished	

== Election results ==
=== Elections in the 1910s ===
Donald Maclean

General election 1918: Peebles and Southern Midlothian
Party	Candidate	Votes	%	±%
Liberal	Donald Maclean	7,429	60.6	
Labour	James Gold	4,830	39.4	
Majority		2,599	21.2	
Turnout		12,259	52.6	
Liberal win (new seat)				

=== Elections in the 1920s ===
General election 1922: Peebles and Southern Midlothian
Party	Candidate	Votes	%	±%
Labour	Joseph Westwood	6,394	36.0	−3.4
Unionist	Archibald Crawford	5,992	33.7	New
Liberal	Donald Maclean	5,377	30.3	−30.3
Majority		402	2.3	N/A
Turnout		17,723	75.7	+23.1
Labour gain from Liberal		Swing		

General election 1923: Peebles and Southern Midlothian
Party	Candidate	Votes	%	±%
Labour	Joseph Westwood	7,882	43.0	+7.0
Unionist	Archibald Crawford	6,203	33.8	+0.1
Liberal	William Mitchell	4,245	23.2	−7.1
Majority		1,679	9.2	+6.9
Turnout		18,330	76.9	+1.2
Labour hold		Swing	+3.4	

General election 1924: Peebles and Southern Midlothian
Party	Candidate	Votes	%	±%
Labour	Joseph Westwood	7,797	40.8	−2.2
Unionist	Charles Baillie-Hamilton	6,723	35.3	+1.5
Liberal	William Mitchell	4,550	23.9	+0.7
Majority		1,074	5.5	−3.7
Turnout		19,070	78.8	+1.9
Labour hold		Swing	−1.8	

General election 1929: Peebles and Southern Midlothian
Party	Candidate	Votes	%	±%
Labour	Joseph Westwood	11,161	45.5	+4.7
Unionist	Hylton Murray-Philipson	7,736	31.5	−3.8
Liberal	James McGowan	5,648	23.0	−0.9
Majority		3,425	14.0	+8.5
Turnout		24,545	75.7	−3.1
Labour hold		Swing	+4.2	

=== Elections in the 1930s ===
General election 1931: Peebles and Southern Midlothian
Party	Candidate	Votes	%	±%
Unionist	Archibald Maule Ramsay	17,435	65.5	+34.0
Labour	Joseph Westwood	9,185	34.5	−11.0
Majority		8,250	31.0	N/A
Turnout		26,620	79.7	+4.0
Unionist gain from Labour		Swing		

General election 1935: Peebles and Southern Midlothian
Party	Candidate	Votes	%	±%
Unionist	Archibald Maule Ramsay	13,671	52.8	−12.7
Labour	David Pryde	12,209	47.2	+12.7
Majority		1,462	5.6	−25.4
Turnout		25,880	74.9	−4.8
Unionist hold		Swing		

General Election 1939–40: Another General Election was required to take place before the end of 1940. The political parties had been making preparations for an election to take place and by the Autumn of 1939, the following candidates had been selected;

- Unionist:
- Labour: David Pryde

=== Elections in the 1940s ===
General election 1945: Peebles and Southern Midlothian Electorate 37,844
Party	Candidate	Votes	%	±%
Labour	David Pryde	15,546	55.7	+8.5
Unionist	James Latham McDiarmid Clyde	9,050	32.4	−20.4
Liberal	Leonard Gellatly	3,299	11.8	New
Majority		6,496	23.3	N/A
Turnout		27,895	73.7	−1.2
Labour gain from Unionist		Swing		
