= William Mitchell (advocate) =

Scottish Advocate and Liberal politician

William Mitchell KC (1872-22 February 1937) was a Scottish advocate and Liberal Party politician. He was Sheriff-substitute of Selkirkshire.

== Background ==
Mitchell was born in Keith, Banffshire, the son of George and Kathryn Mitchell. He was educated at Keith Grammar School and the Universities of Aberdeen, where he gained an MA and Edinburgh where he received an LLB. He was a Vans Dunlop Scholar in Scots Law and Conveyancing. He died at Galashiels on 22 February 1937.

== Professional career ==
Mitchell was Examiner for degrees in legal subjects at Aberdeen and Edinburgh Universities. In 1897 he was called to Scots bar. He was Advocate Depute for several years. He was Sheriff-Substitute of Selkirkshire from 1930 until his death in 1937. In 1930 he wrote 'Prince Charles Edward Stewart of Scotland and the Rising of 1745'.

== Political career ==
Mitchell was National Liberal candidate for the Kincardine and Western Aberdeenshire division at the 1922 General Election. He was a supporter of David Lloyd George, Prime Minister of the Coalition Government. He ran against the sitting Liberal MP, who was an opposition Liberal, but failed to unseat him. In 1923 the two opposing Liberal factions re-united under the leadership of H. H. Asquith. Mitchell was Liberal candidate for the Peebles and Southern Midlothian division at the 1923 General Election. This was a Labour seat that the Liberals had lost in 1922, coming third. He was unable to improve on that position. Soon after, he was Liberal candidate for the Peebles and Southern Midlothian division at the 1924 General Election. Despite this election being a difficult one for the Liberal Party, he was able to marginally increase the Liberal vote. He was Liberal candidate for the Edinburgh North division at the 1929 General Election. Lloyd George travelled to Edinburgh to help Mitchell's campaign, stopping at Mitchell's home in King Street. The Liberals had won the seat in 1923 but finished third in 1924. Despite increasing the Liberal vote share, he was unable to improve on third place. He did not stand for parliament again.

=== Electoral record ===
General Election 1922: Kincardine & Western Aberdeenshire
Party	Candidate	Votes	%	±%
Liberal	Hon. Arthur Cecil Murray	6,224	62.3	n/a
National Liberal	William Mitchell	3,767	37.7	n/a
Majority		2,457	24.6	n/a
Turnout			44.6	n/a
Liberal hold		Swing	n/a	

General Election 1923: Peebles and Southern Midlothian
Party	Candidate	Votes	%	±%
Labour	Joseph C. Westwood	7,882	43.0	+7.0
Unionist	Archibald Crawford	6,203	33.8	+0.1
Liberal	William Mitchell	4,245	23.2	−7.1
Majority		1,679	9.2	+6.9
Turnout			76.9	+1.2
Labour hold		Swing	+3.4	

General Election 1924: Peebles and Southern Midlothian
Party	Candidate	Votes	%	±%
Labour	Joseph C. Westwood	7,797	40.8	−2.2
Unionist	Charles William Baillie-Hamilton	6,723	35.3	+1.5
Liberal	William Mitchell	4,550	23.9	+0.7
Majority		1,074	5.5	−3.7
Turnout			78.8	+1.9
Labour hold		Swing	-1.8	

General Election 1929: Edinburgh North
Party	Candidate	Votes	%	±%
Unionist	Sir Patrick Johnstone Ford	13,993	39.7	−9.6
Labour	Miss E Stewart	11,340	32.2	+4.3
Liberal	William Mitchell	9,877	28.1	+5.4
Majority		2,653	7.5	−13.9
Turnout		35,210	73.8	
Unionist hold		Swing	-6.9	
