= 1932 North Cornwall by-election =

UK parliamentary by-election

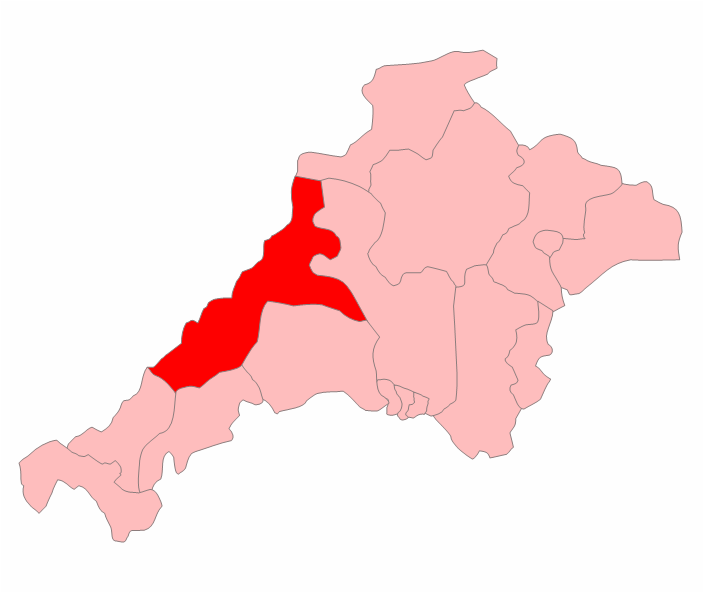
The North Cornwall constituency showing 1932 boundaries within Cornwall and Devon

The 1932 North Cornwall by-election was a parliamentary by-election held on 22 July 1932 for the British House of Commons constituency of North Cornwall.

== Vacancy ==
The seat had become vacant when the constituency's Liberal Member of Parliament (MP), the Rt Hon. Sir Donald Maclean died on 15 June 1932. He had been MP here since 1929. Maclean joined the National Government, a coalition. He served as President of the Board of Education from 1931 to 1932, when he died from cardiovascular disease at the age of sixty-eight.

== Electoral history ==
The seat was a traditional Liberal/Conservative marginal. At the last election, despite Maclean being a senior member of the National Government he was opposed by a Conservative;

1931 general election: North Cornwall Electorate 40,020
Party	Candidate	Votes	%	±%
Liberal	Donald Maclean	16,867	49.1	−0.6
Conservative	Alfred Martyn Williams	15,526	45.3	+3.0
Labour	A. Bennett	1,907	5.6	−2.4
Majority		1,341	3.8	−3.6
Turnout		35,300	85.7	−0.4
Liberal hold		Swing		

== Candidates ==
- The Rt Hon. Sir Francis Dyke Acland, Bt. was chosen as the Liberal candidate. Acland was a junior minister from 1908 until 1910 and again from 1911 until 1916. He was first elected to Parliament, to represent Richmond (Yorkshire) from 1906 until January 1910 when he was defeated. He returned to Parliament, representing Camborne from December 1910 until November 1922. He contested Tiverton in 1922 and was later the MP there between June and December 1923. Finally contesting Hexham in May 1929.
- The Conservative candidate was local politician Alfred Martyn Williams, who had been born in 1897. He had previously been MP for the seat between 1924 and 1929. He had unsuccessfully contested the division at the general elections of 1929 and 1931.
- The Labour Party decided not to nominate a candidate.

== Campaign ==
Polling day was fixed for 22 July 1932, 37 days after the death of Maclean.

The main issue that divided the Conservatives and Liberals in the National Government was that of Free Trade versus Protection. Both parties were keen to take their dispute to the by-election hustings. Conservative leader, Stanley Baldwin, spent much time in the constituency speaking in support of the Conservative candidate and many other Conservative MPs toured the constituency. The Conservative's sought to argue that the Liberals, who were a minor partner in Government, were being disloyal to it by arguing for free trade. Acland himself suggested in his victory speech that by demanding his "unreserved and unqualified support for the government", the Conservatives had made a "strategic mistake", given that Cornish constituencies were notoriously independently-minded at the time.

== Result ==
The Liberals held the seat and increased their share of the vote.

22 July 1932 by-election: North Cornwall Electorate 40,020
Party	Candidate	Votes	%	±%
Liberal	Francis Dyke Acland	16,933	52.4	+3.3
Conservative	Alfred Martyn Williams	15,387	47.6	+2.3
Majority		1,546	4.8	+1.0
Turnout		32,320	80.8	−4.9
Liberal hold		Swing		

== See also ==
- 1939 North Cornwall by-election
- North Cornwall constituency
- List of United Kingdom by-elections (1931–1950)
- United Kingdom by-election records
