= 1923 Tiverton by-election =

UK parliamentary by-election

The 1923 Tiverton by-election was a parliamentary by-election held for the British House of Commons constituency of Tiverton in Devon on 21 June 1923.

== Vacancy ==
The by-election was caused by the death from pneumonia on 22 May 1923 of the sitting Unionist Party MP, Herbert Sparkes. Sparkes had been elected at the 1922 general election with a majority of just 74 votes over his Liberal opponent Francis Dyke Acland, with Labour’s Fred Brown badly adrift in third place and losing his deposit.

General election 1922
Party	Candidate	Votes	%	±%
Unionist	Herbert Sparkes	10,304	46.9	–10.3
Liberal	Francis Dyke Acland	10,230	46.5	+17.8
Labour	Frederick Brown	1,457	6.6	–7.5
Majority		74	0.4	–28.1
Turnout		21,991	80.1	+5.3
Unionist hold		Swing	–14.0	

== Candidates ==
The Unionists selected Colonel Gilbert Acland-Troyte from Bampton near Tiverton, a professional soldier, as their candidate. The Liberals stuck with Acland, who had formerly been MP for Richmond in the North Riding of Yorkshire and for Camborne in Cornwall and who had been a government minister. The Tory and Liberal candidates were actually cousins, their grandfathers had been brothers. The Labour Party decided not to contest the election but Mr Brown wished to stand again. Labour refused to endorse his candidacy and he therefore resigned from the Labour Party and put himself up as an Independent Labour candidate.

== Issues ==
The Liberal and Unionist candidates sparred over the relative merits of the government’s agricultural and land policy, with Acland urging the government to invest more in farming communities and relieve rates on agricultural land. Brown tried to make capital on this issue too emphasising his role as the local organiser for the Agricultural Workers’ Union. While Acland-Troyte also defended the government’s overall record, Francis Acland was playing up his south-western credentials and his personal qualities. The fact that the Lloyd George and Asquithian wings of the Liberal Party in the area both supported Acland and the party nationally appeared to be moving towards reunion was also offered as a factor in shoring up support for the party in the by-election.

== Result ==
Despite local Unionist optimism that they would be able to hold the seat, Acland got home with a majority of 402.

Acland

Tiverton by-election, 1923
Party	Candidate	Votes	%	±%
Liberal	Francis Dyke Acland	12,041	49.8	+3.3
Unionist	Gilbert Acland-Troyte	11,639	48.1	+1.3
Independent Labour	Frederick Brown	495	2.0	–4.6
Majority		402	1.7	N/A
Turnout		24,174	88.1	+8.0
Liberal gain from Unionist		Swing	+1.0	

Brown’s vote at the previous general election deserted him with ex-Labour voters recognising that he could not win, especially without official Labour backing, and voted for Acland to deny the seat to the Tories. Brown lost hs deposit again. Both the Liberal and Unionist candidates increased their total vote on an increased turnout from the general election (up from 80.1% to 88.1%) but the fall in the Labour vote was the key to the result.

== See also ==
- List of United Kingdom by-elections
- United Kingdom by-election records
