= Tom Horabin =

British politician (1896-1956)

Liberal Chief Whip
- In office 2 August 1945 – 21 March 1946
- Leader: Clement Davies
- Preceded by: Percy Harris
- Succeeded by: Frank Byers

Member of Parliament for North Cornwall
- In office 13 July 1939 – 3 February 1950
- Preceded by: Francis Dyke Acland
- Succeeded by: Harold Roper

Personal details
- Born: Thomas Lewis Horabin; 28 December 1896 Merthyr Tydfil, Mid Glamorgan, Wales, UK
- Died: 26 April 1956 (aged 59) Folkestone, Kent, England, UK
- Party: Labour (from 1947)
- Other political affiliations: Independent (1946-47); Liberal (until 1946)
- Children: 3
- Education: Cardiff High School

Thomas Lewis Horabin (28 December 1896 – 26 April 1956) was a British Liberal Party politician who defected to the Labour Party. He sat in the House of Commons from 1939 to 1950.

== Early life and career ==
Horabin was born in Merthyr Tydfil and educated at Cardiff High School, and during the First World War he served from 1914 to 1918 with the Cameron Highlanders.

After the war he went into business, and became chairman of Lacrinoid Ltd, which made buttons and other synthetic products. Later he worked as a business consultant, and worked with a company formed in 1948 to develop trade with Yugoslavia.

== Political career ==
Following the death of Liberal Member of Parliament (MP), Sir Francis Acland in 1939, Horabin was selected by North Cornwall Liberals to defend the marginal seat at the resulting by-election. Along with his party leader, Sir Archibald Sinclair, he was a vocal opponent of Chamberlain's Nazi appeasement policy. This issue was central to the debate in the by-election, which he won with an increased majority of 1,464 in a straight fight with the Conservatives.

He was also a strong advocate, along with Sir Stafford Cripps, of a Popular Front of left-of-centre parties coming together to defeat the Conservative led National government. He continued to hold the seat until 1950.

In 1944 he authored Politics Made Plain. What the next general election will really be about, a book published by Penguin which urged voters to reject Churchill and the Conservatives at the general election. He was re-elected in 1945 and appointed Liberal Chief Whip by the new Liberal leader, Clement Davies. However, he became frustrated with some of the pro-Conservative sympathies of some of his colleagues. He resigned his post and his party's whip in 1946 to sit as an independent.

In January 1947, he was seriously injured when a BOAC aircraft in which he was a passenger crashed in Kent. He later sued BOAC for damages, and after hearings in the High Court, the case was settled in November 1952 when he accepted £3,017 in damages.

In November 1947 Horabin took the Labour whip.

The North Cornwall Liberals wanted him to resign the seat and seek re-election, but he refused, saying that the principles for which he stood had been set out clearly in his address to voters at the general election.

At the 1950 election, Labour invited him to defend North Cornwall as a Labour candidate, but he refused on the grounds that he would then be campaigning against people who had previously campaigned for him. A further factor was that his injuries in the crash had been severe, keeping him away from Parliament for a year, and a campaign in the scattered North Cornwall constituency might have been too great a strain. Instead he fought Exeter as the Labour candidate, but lost to the sitting Conservative MP John Cyril Maude.

== Personal life ==
Horabin died in Folkestone on 26 April 1956, aged 60. Having married in 1920, he left a widow, two sons and a daughter.

Parliament of the United Kingdom
Preceded by Francis Dyke Acland	Member of Parliament for North Cornwall; 1939–1950	Succeeded by Harold Roper
Party political offices
Preceded by Percy Harris	Liberal Chief Whip; 1945–1946	Succeeded by Frank Byers
