= Minister of State for International Development =

Senior ministerial position in the Government of the United Kingdom

United Kingdom Minister of State for International Development
- Royal Arms of His Majesty's Government

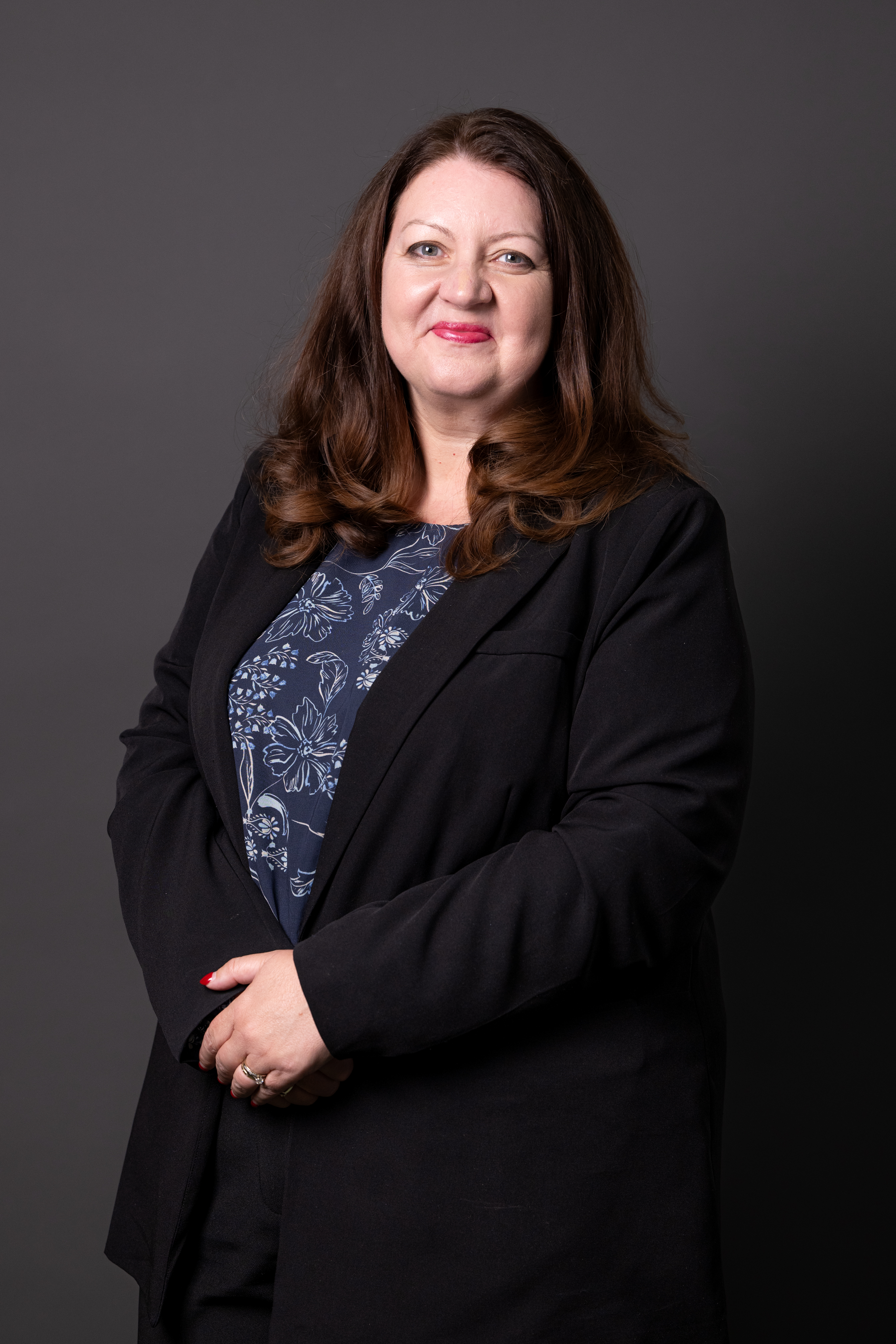
- Incumbent; Kirsty McNeill since 21 July 2026
- Foreign, Commonwealth and Development Office
- Style: International Development Minister (informal); The Right Honourable (within the UK and Commonwealth); His/Her Excellency (diplomatic)
- Status: Minister of the Crown
- Member of: Cabinet (attending); Privy Council; National Security Council
- Reports to: Prime Minister; Foreign Secretary
- Seat: Westminster
- Nominator: The Prime Minister
- Appointer: The Monarch; (on the advice of the Prime Minister)
- Term length: At His Majesty's pleasure
- Formation: 18 October 1964: (as Minister of Overseas Development); 25 October 2022: (as Minister of State for Development and Africa)
- First holder: Barbara Castle (as Minister of Overseas Development)
- Website: www.gov.uk/government/ministers/minister-of-state--214

The minister of state for international development is a ministerial position in the Foreign, Commonwealth and Development Office in the Government of the United Kingdom. The current postholder is Kirsty McNeill since 21 July 2026.

The officeholder headed the Department for International Development (DFID) as secretary of state from 1997 to 2020 and was a member of the Cabinet of the United Kingdom. The Department of International Development was abolished in September 2020 and merged into the Foreign Office. In 2022, the portfolio was restored as a Minister of State attending Cabinet, but was again removed in 2026.

== History ==
A separate Ministry of Overseas Development was established by Harold Wilson when he came to office in 1964. The first three holders of the office served in the Cabinet, but from 29 August 1967 the office was demoted. Under Edward Heath, the Ministry was re-incorporated into the FCO on 15 October 1970. Wilson again established the Ministry in 1974, but later merged it into the FCO once again: from 10 June 1975 to 8 October 1979 the foreign secretary served as Secretary of State for Foreign and Commonwealth Affairs and Minister for Overseas Development in the cabinet, while the minister for overseas development held the rank of Minister of State within the Foreign and Commonwealth Office. The minister of state had day-to-day responsibility. Under the Labour government of the 1970s, Reg Prentice sat in the Cabinet during his term. The post's last and main format was created in 1997 when the Department for International Development was made independent of the Foreign and Commonwealth Office (FCO).

In June 2020, it was announced the Department for International Development would be dissolved, and its operations would be merged into the Foreign and Commonwealth Office. The process was completed by 2 September 2020, with the last international development secretary Anne-Marie Trevelyan remaining in place until that time.

In 2022, the position was revived as a minister of state attending Cabinet during the Truss ministry. From 2022 to 2024 under the Sunak ministry, the position was combined with responsibility for Africa as Minister of State for Development and Africa held by Andrew Mitchell, who continued to attend Cabinet.

Under the Starmer ministry, Anneliese Dodds was appointed as Minister of State for Development attending Cabinet until her resignation in February 2025. Thereafter, Jenny Chapman was given the portfolio as Minister of State for International Development, Latin America and Caribbean from February to September 2025 and then as Minister of State for International Development and Africa until July 2026.

Under the Burnham ministry, the portfolio was again removed from Cabinet and given to Kirsty McNeill.

== Responsibilities ==
The Minister's responsibilities include:

- Africa
- Development and humanitarian
- International finance
- Climate and energy security

== List of ministers and secretaries of state ==
Minister	Term of office		Party	Ministry
=== Ministers of Overseas Development (1964–1970) ===
Barbara Castle	18 October 1964	23 December 1965	Labour	Wilson (I) (II)
Anthony Greenwood	23 December 1965	11 August 1966	Labour	Wilson (I) (II)
Arthur Bottomley	11 August 1966	29 August 1967	Labour	Wilson (I) (II)
Reg Prentice	29 August 1967	6 October 1969	Labour	Wilson (I) (II)
Judith Hart	6 October 1969	19 June 1970	Labour	Wilson (I) (II)
Richard Wood	23 June 1970	4 March 1974	Conservative	Heath
Judith Hart	7 March 1974	10 June 1975	Labour	Wilson (III)
Reg Prentice	10 June 1975	21 December 1976 (resigned)	Labour	Wilson (III)
Reg Prentice	10 June 1975	21 December 1976 (resigned)	Labour	Callaghan
Frank Judd	21 December 1976	21 February 1977	Labour	Callaghan
Judith Hart	21 February 1977	4 May 1979	Labour	Callaghan
Neil Marten	6 May 1979	6 January 1983	Conservative	Thatcher (I) (II) (III)
Timothy Raison	6 January 1983	10 September 1986	Conservative	Thatcher (I) (II) (III)
Chris Patten	10 September 1986	24 July 1989	Conservative	Thatcher (I) (II) (III)
Lynda Chalker; Baroness Chalker of Wallasey from 1992	24 July 1989	2 May 1997	Conservative	Thatcher (I) (II) (III)
Lynda Chalker; Baroness Chalker of Wallasey from 1992	24 July 1989	2 May 1997	Conservative	Major (I) (II)
=== Secretaries of State for International Development (1997–2020) ===
Clare Short	3 May 1997	12 May 2003	Labour	Blair (I) (II) (III)
Valerie Amos, Baroness Amos	12 May 2003	6 October 2003	Labour	Blair (I) (II) (III)
Hilary Benn	6 October 2003	28 June 2007	Labour	Blair (I) (II) (III)
Douglas Alexander	28 June 2007	11 May 2010	Labour	Brown
Andrew Mitchell	12 May 2010	4 September 2012	Conservative	Cameron-Clegg
Justine Greening	4 September 2012	14 July 2016	Conservative	Cameron-Clegg
Justine Greening	4 September 2012	14 July 2016	Conservative	Cameron (II)
Priti Patel	14 July 2016	8 November 2017	Conservative	May (I)
Priti Patel	14 July 2016	8 November 2017	Conservative	May (II)
Penny Mordaunt	9 November 2017	1 May 2019	Conservative	May (II)
Rory Stewart	1 May 2019	24 July 2019	Conservative	May (II)
Alok Sharma	24 July 2019	13 February 2020	Conservative	Johnson (I)
Alok Sharma	24 July 2019	13 February 2020	Conservative	Johnson (II)
Anne-Marie Trevelyan	13 February 2020	2 September 2020	Conservative	Johnson (II)
Abolished	2 September 2020	6 September 2022	Conservative	Johnson (II)
=== Minister of State for Development (2022) ===
Vicky Ford	6 September 2022	25 October 2022	Conservative	Truss
=== Minister of State for Development and Africa (2022–2024) ===
Andrew Mitchell	25 October 2022	5 July 2024	Conservative	Sunak
=== Minister of State for Development (2024–2025) ===
Anneliese Dodds	8 July 2024	28 February 2025	Labour	Starmer
=== Minister of State for International Development, Latin America and Caribbean (February–September 2025) ===
Jenny Chapman, Baroness Chapman of Darlington	28 February 2025	5 September 2025	Labour	Starmer
=== Minister of State for International Development and Africa (September 2025–July 2026) ===
Jenny Chapman, Baroness Chapman of Darlington	5 September 2025	20 July 2026	Labour	Starmer
=== Minister of State for International Development (since July 2026) ===
Kirsty McNeill	21 July 2026	Incumbent	Labour	Burnham
