= North Cornwall (constituency) =

Parliamentary constituency in the United Kingdom, 1918 onwards

Coordinates: 50.689°N 4.594°W

- County constituency for the House of Commons
- Interactive map of boundaries since 2024
- Boundary of North Cornwall in South West England
- County: Cornwall
- Electorate: 76,741 (2024)
- Major settlements: Bodmin, Bude, Camelford, Launceston, Padstow and Wadebridge

Current constituency
- Created: 1918
- Member of Parliament: Ben Maguire (Liberal Democrat)
- Seats: One
- Created from: Launceston and St Austell

North Cornwall is a constituency (Note: A county constituency (for the purposes of election expenses and type of returning officer)) represented in the House of Commons of the UK Parliament by Ben Maguire, a Liberal Democrat since the 2024 general election. Like all British constituencies, the seat elects one Member of Parliament (MP) by the first past the post system of election at least every five years. The seat was created in 1918. Since 1950, the constituency has been held by MPs from either the Conservative Party or the Liberal Democrats (including the party's predecessor, the Liberal Party).

== Constituency profile ==
North Cornwall is a constituency in Cornwall. Its largest town is Bodmin, which has a population of around 18,000. Other towns include St Columb Major, Padstow, Wadebridge, Camelford, Launceston, Stratton and Bude.

This is a large, rural constituency with many small towns and villages. Like the rest of Cornwall, the coastal areas are popular with tourists and contain many holiday parks and second homes. The constituency has below-average levels of wealth with some deprivation in Bodmin. Despite this, the prevalence of holiday homes has pushed up local house prices, with the average price being above the national average.

North Cornwall has a large retired population and a low proportion of young adults. Residents have low levels of education and average rates of homeownership. Household income is low and the child poverty rate is above average. A high proportion of residents work in the retail and tourism industries, and the percentage claiming unemployment benefits is in line with the national average. White people made up 97% of the population at the 2021 census.

Most of North Cornwall is represented by Liberal Democrats at the local council with a small number of independent councillors. Voters here strongly supported leaving the European Union in the 2016 referendum; an estimated 60% voted in favour of Brexit compared to the UK-wide figure of 52%.

== History ==
This constituency was created under the Representation of the People Act 1918.

With exceptions in 1997, 2001 and 2019, the seat's margin of victory has been less than 20% of the vote. It has been consistently fought over between and won by the Conservative Party and the Liberal Democrats' candidate (or predecessor party in the latter case), and can be considered a marginal seat. In 1997 and 2001 the seat turned out strongly overall for the latter party. However, in the 2019 general election, the Conservatives won a large majority of 28.6% over the Liberal Democrat candidate. This was overturned in the 2024 general election when the Liberal Democrats recaptured the seat with a majority of 19.4%.

The highest third-placed (other party) candidate was the 16.4% achieved by Reform UK in 2024. The seat saw three years of defection of its Liberal MP to join the post-World War II Attlee Ministry however in 2015 saw the lowest share of the Labour Party's vote nationally – reinforcing a consistent result by a great majority supporting left-wing politics to vote for a Liberal and later Liberal Democrat at general elections since the seat's inception.

== Boundaries ==
Boundaries from 2010 to 2024

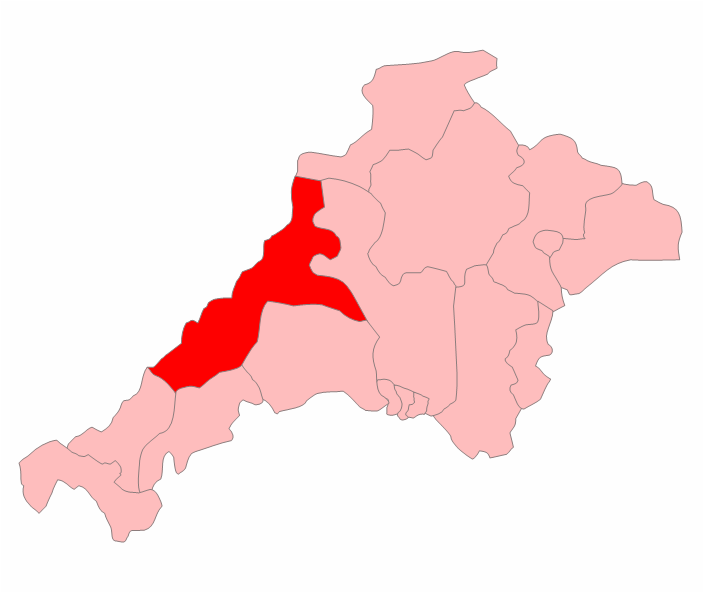
The North Cornwall constituency shown within Cornwall and Devon, 1918–1945

1918–1950: The Borough of Launceston, the urban districts of Newquay, Padstow, Stratton and Bude, and Wadebridge, the rural districts of Calstock, Camelford, Launceston, St Columb Major, and Stratton, and parts of the rural districts of Bodmin and Holsworthy (these areas such as Whitstone and Week St Mary were on the Cornish side of the border).

1950–1974: The Borough of Launceston, the urban districts of Bude-Stratton, Newquay, and Padstow, the Rural Districts of Camelford, Launceston, and Stratton, and parts of the rural districts of St Austell and Wadebridge.

1974–1983: The Borough of Launceston, the urban districts of Bude-Stratton and Newquay, the Rural Districts of Camelford, Launceston, and Stratton, and parts of the rural districts of St Austell, and Wadebridge and Padstow.

1983–2010: The District of North Cornwall wards of Allan, Altarnun, Bodmin St Mary's, Bodmin St Petroc, Bude and Poughill, Camelford, Grenville, Lanivet, Launceston North, Launceston South, Lesnewth, North Petherwin, Ottery, Padstow and St Merryn, Penfound, Rumford, St Breward, St Endellion, St Minver, St Teath, South Petherwin, Stratton, Tintagel, Trigg, Wadebridge, and Week St Mary, and the Borough of Restormel wards of Edgcumbe, Gannel, Rialton, St Columb, and St Enoder.

2010–2024: The District of North Cornwall.

2024–present: Further to the 2023 Periodic Review of Westminster constituencies which became effective for the 2024 general election, the constituency is composed of the following electoral divisions of Cornwall (as they existed on 4 May 2021):

- Altarnun & Stoke Climsland; Bodmin St Mary's & St. Leonard; Bodmin St Petroc's; Bude; Camelford & Boscastle; Lanivet, Blisland & Bodmin St Lawrence; Launceston North & North Petherwin; Launceston South; Padstow; Poundstock; St Columb Major, St Mawgan & St Wenn; St Teath & Tintagel; Stratton, Kilkhampton & Morwenstow; Wadebridge East & St Minver; Wadebridge West & St Mabyn.

The St Columb Major, St Mawgan & St Wenn division was transferred from St Austell and Newquay. Otherwise unchanged.

Historically four borough constituencies lay within the boundaries, three of which were abolished as 'rotten boroughs' by the Reform Act 1832:

- Bossiney (abolished 1832)
- Camelford (abolished 1832)
- Launceston (abolished 1885)
- Newport (abolished 1832 – settlement now a suburb of Launceston).

== Members of Parliament ==
Election	Member	Party	Notes
1918	George Marks	Coalition Liberal	Member for Launceston (1906–1918)
1922	George Marks	National Liberal	
1923	George Marks	Liberal	
1924	Alfred Martyn Williams	Conservative	
1929	Donald Maclean	Liberal	President of the Board of Education (1931–1932), Died June 1932
1932 by-election	Francis Dyke Acland	Liberal	Deputy Leader of the Liberal Party (1935–1939), Died June 1939
1939 by-election	Tom Horabin	Liberal	Chief Whip of the Liberal Party (1945–1946)
1946	Tom Horabin	Independent	
1947	Tom Horabin	Labour	
1950	Harold Roper	Conservative	
1959	James Scott-Hopkins	Conservative	
1966	John Pardoe	Liberal	President of the Liberal Party (1971–1972); Deputy Leader of the Liberal Party (1976–1979)
1979	Gerry Neale (Note: Knighted in 1991)	Conservative	
1992	Paul Tyler	Liberal Democrat	Member for Bodmin (1974); Chief Whip of the Liberal Democrats (1997–2001)
2005	Dan Rogerson	Liberal Democrat	Minister for Rural Affairs (2013–2015)
2015	Scott Mann	Conservative	
2024	Ben Maguire	Liberal Democrat	

== Elections ==
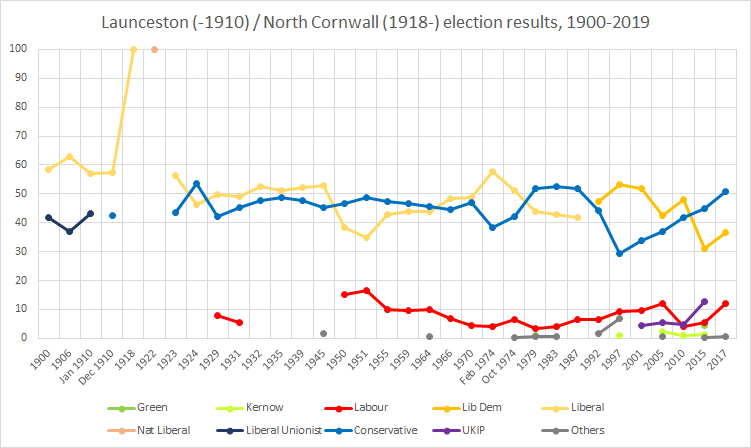
North Cornwall electoral history

=== Elections in the 2020s ===
General election 2024: North Cornwall
Party	Candidate	Votes	%	±%
Liberal Democrats	Ben Maguire	24,094	47.0	+17.1
Conservative	Scott Mann	14,137	27.6	−31.5
Reform	Rowland O'Connor	8,444	16.5	N/A
Labour	Robyn Harris	2,958	5.8	−3.8
Green	Lance Symonds	1,335	2.6	+2.4
Heritage	Sarah Farrell	277	0.5	N/A
Majority		9,957	19.4	N/A
Turnout		51,245	66.8	−4.3
Registered electors		76,741		
Liberal Democrats gain from Conservative		Swing	+24.3	

=== Elections in the 2010s ===
2019 notional result
Party	Vote	%
Conservative	31,941	59.1
Liberal Democrats	16,158	29.9
Labour	5,201	9.6
Others	676	1.3
Green	101	0.2
Turnout	54,077	72.1
Electorate	75,034	

General election 2019: North Cornwall
Party	Candidate	Votes	%	±%
Conservative	Scott Mann	30,671	59.4	+8.7
Liberal Democrats	Danny Chambers	15,919	30.8	−5.8
Labour	Joy Bassett	4,516	8.7	−3.4
Liberal	Elmars Liepins	572	1.1	N/A
Majority		14,752	28.6	+14.5
Turnout		51,678	73.9	−0.1
Conservative hold		Swing	+7.3	

General election 2017: North Cornwall
Party	Candidate	Votes	%	±%
Conservative	Scott Mann	25,835	50.7	+5.7
Liberal Democrats	Dan Rogerson	18,635	36.6	+5.4
Labour	Joy Bassett	6,151	12.1	+6.7
CPA	John Allman	185	0.4	+0.3
Socialist Labour	Robert Hawkins	138	0.3	N/A
Majority		7,200	14.1	+0.3
Turnout		50,944	74.0	+2.2
Conservative hold		Swing	+0.3	

General election 2015: North Cornwall
Party	Candidate	Votes	%	±%
Conservative	Scott Mann	21,689	45.0	+3.3
Liberal Democrats	Dan Rogerson	15,068	31.2	−16.9
UKIP	Julie Lingard	6,121	12.7	+7.8
Labour	John Whitby	2,621	5.4	+1.2
Green	Amanda Pennington	2,063	4.3	N/A
Mebyon Kernow	Jerry Jefferies	631	1.3	+0.2
Restore the Family for Children's Sake	John Allman	52	0.1	N/A
Majority		6,621	13.8	N/A
Turnout		48,245	71.8	+3.6
Conservative gain from Liberal Democrats		Swing	+10.1	

General election 2010: North Cornwall
Party	Candidate	Votes	%	±%
Liberal Democrats	Dan Rogerson	22,512	48.1	+5.7
Conservative	Sian Flynn	19,531	41.7	+6.3
UKIP	Miriel O'Connor	2,300	4.9	−0.8
Labour	Janet Hulme	1,971	4.2	−8.3
Mebyon Kernow	Joanie Willet	530	1.1	−2.1
Majority		2,981	6.4	+0.9
Turnout		46,844	68.2	+3.7
Liberal Democrats hold		Swing	−0.3	

=== Elections in the 2000s ===
General election 2005: North Cornwall
Party	Candidate	Votes	%	±%
Liberal Democrats	Dan Rogerson	23,842	42.6	−9.4
Conservative	Mark Formosa	20,766	37.1	+3.3
Labour	David Acton	6,636	11.9	+2.2
UKIP	David Campbell-Bannerman	3,063	5.5	+1.1
Mebyon Kernow	Dick Cole	1,351	2.4	N/A
Veritas	Alan Eastwood	324	0.6	N/A
Majority		3,076	5.5	−12.7
Turnout		55,982	64.5	+0.7
Liberal Democrats hold		Swing	−6.4	

General election 2001: North Cornwall
Party	Candidate	Votes	%	±%
Liberal Democrats	Paul Tyler	28,082	52.0	−1.2
Conservative	John Weller	18,250	33.8	+4.3
Labour	Michael Goodman	5,257	9.7	+0.3
UKIP	Steve Protz	2,394	4.4	N/A
Majority		9,832	18.2	−5.5
Turnout		53,983	63.8	−9.3
Liberal Democrats hold		Swing	−2.7	

=== Elections in the 1990s ===
General election 1997: North Cornwall
Party	Candidate	Votes	%	±%
Liberal Democrats	Paul Tyler	31,100	53.2	+5.8
Conservative	Nigel Linacre	17,253	29.5	−14.8
Labour	Anne Lindo	5,523	9.4	+2.8
Referendum	Felicity Odam	3,636	6.2	N/A
Mebyon Kernow	John Bolitho	645	1.1	N/A
Liberal	Rif Winfield	186	0.3	−0.8
Natural Law	Nicholas Creswell	152	0.3	+0.1
Majority		13,847	23.7	+10.6
Turnout		58,495	73.1	−9.0
Liberal Democrats hold		Swing	+10.3 (Note: The largest two-party swing in this election was (Con-Ref): 10.5%)	

General election 1992: Cornwall North
Party	Candidate	Votes	%	±%
Liberal Democrats	Paul Tyler	29,696	47.4	+5.5
Conservative	Gerry Neale	27,775	44.3	−7.4
Labour	Frank Jordan	4,103	6.6	+0.2
Liberal	Philip Andrews	678	1.1	N/A
Independent	Geoffrey Rowe	276	0.4	N/A
Natural Law	Robyn Treadwell	112	0.2	N/A
Majority		1,921	3.1	N/A
Turnout		62,640	82.1	+2.3
Liberal Democrats gain from Conservative		Swing	+6.5	

=== Elections in the 1980s ===
General election 1987: Cornwall North
Party	Candidate	Votes	%	±%
Conservative	Gerry Neale	29,862	51.7	−0.7
Liberal	Michael Mitchell	24,180	41.9	−1.1
Labour	Christine Herries	3,719	6.4	+2.5
Majority		5,682	9.8	+0.4
Turnout		57,761	79.8	−0.6
Conservative hold		Swing	+0.9	

General election 1983: Cornwall North
Party	Candidate	Votes	%	±%
Conservative	Gerry Neale	28,146	52.4	+0.8
Liberal	David Chambers	23,087	43.0	−0.8
Labour	James Hayday	2,096	3.9	−0.7
Cornish Nationalist	James Whetter	364	0.7	N/A
Majority		5,059	9.4	+1.6
Turnout		53,693	80.4	
Conservative hold		Swing	+0.8	

=== Elections in the 1970s ===
General election 1979: Cornwall North
Party	Candidate	Votes	%	±%
Conservative	Gerry Neale	24,489	51.65	+9.65
Liberal	John Pardoe	20,742	43.75	−7.50
Labour	R.B. Tremlett	1,514	3.19	−3.21
Ecology	J. Faull	442	0.93	N/A
National Front	R. Bridgwater	224	0.47	N/A
Majority		3,747	7.90	N/A
Turnout		47,411	86.1	+5.6
Conservative gain from Liberal		Swing	+8.58	

General election October 1974: Cornwall North
Party	Candidate	Votes	%	±%
Liberal	John Pardoe	21,368	51.25	−6.65
Conservative	Gerry Neale	17,512	42.00	
Labour	R. Tremlett	2,663	6.40	
Anti Party System	R.J. Bridgwater	148	0.35	N/A
Majority		3,856	9.25	
Turnout		41,691	80.52	
Liberal hold		Swing		

- February 1974; new constituency boundaries applied.

General election February 1974: Cornwall North
Party	Candidate	Votes	%	±%
Liberal	John Pardoe	25,667	57.90	
Conservative	Trixie Gardner	16,938	38.21	
Labour	J.B. Benjamin	1,726	3.89	
Majority		8,729	19.69	
Turnout		44,331	86.29	
Liberal hold		Swing		

General election 1970: Cornwall North
Party	Candidate	Votes	%	±%
Liberal	John Pardoe	19,863	48.64	+0.14
Conservative	Simon James Day	19,223	47.10	+2.56
Labour	Ernest William J Hill	1,741	4.26	−2.69
Majority		630	1.54	−2.42
Turnout		40,827	85.11	−2.42
Liberal hold		Swing	-1.21	

=== Elections in the 1960s ===
General election 1966: Cornwall North
Party	Candidate	Votes	%	±%
Liberal	John Pardoe	18,460	48.50	+4.69
Conservative	James Scott-Hopkins	16,952	44.54	−1.14
Labour	Reginald S. Wills	2,647	6.95	−2.82
Majority		1,508	3.96	N/A
Turnout		38,059	87.53	
Liberal gain from Conservative		Swing		

General election 1964: Cornwall North
Party	Candidate	Votes	%	±%
Conservative	James Scott-Hopkins	16,352	45.68	
Liberal	Charles Meddon Karslake Bruton	15,683	43.81	
Labour	Raymond S Dash	3,497	9.77	
Independent	Edward George C Voullaire	265	0.74	N/A
Majority		669	1.87	
Turnout		35,797	83.10	
Conservative hold		Swing		

=== Elections in the 1950s ===
General election 1959: Cornwall North
Party	Candidate	Votes	%	±%
Conservative	James Scott-Hopkins	16,701	46.7	−0.7
Liberal	Edwin Malindine	15,712	43.9	+1.0
Labour	William Carlo Ferman	3,389	9.5	−0.3
Majority		989	2.8	−1.7
Turnout		35,802	83.7	+1.4
Conservative hold		Swing		

General election 1955: Cornwall North
Party	Candidate	Votes	%	±%
Conservative	Harold Roper	16,824	47.38	
Liberal	Edwin Malindine	15,220	42.86	
Labour	Vernon Eric Cornford	3,465	9.76	
Majority		1,604	4.52	
Turnout		35,509	82.30	
Conservative hold		Swing		

General election 1951: Cornwall North
Party	Candidate	Votes	%	±%
Conservative	Harold Roper	18,009	48.77	
Liberal	Dingle Foot	12,869	34.85	
Labour	William Carlo Ferman	6,049	16.38	
Majority		5,140	13.92	
Turnout		36,927	85.71	
Conservative hold		Swing		

General election 1950: Cornwall North
Party	Candidate	Votes	%	±%
Conservative	Harold Roper	17,059	46.6	+1.2
Liberal	Dingle Foot	13,987	38.3	−14.6
Labour	Herbert Leslie Richardson	5,521	15.1	N/A
Majority		3,072	8.3	N/A
Turnout		36,567	85.9	+13.2
Conservative gain from Liberal		Swing		

=== Elections in the 1940s ===
General election 1945: Cornwall North
Party	Candidate	Votes	%	±%
Liberal	Tom Horabin	18,836	52.9	+1.6
Conservative	Thomas Percy Fulford	16,171	45.4	−3.3
Independent Labour	John Hazlewood Worrall	626	1.8	N/A
Majority		2,665	7.5	+4.9
Turnout		35,633	72.7	−7.2
Liberal hold		Swing		

=== Elections in the 1930s ===
1939 North Cornwall by-election
Party	Candidate	Votes	%	±%
Liberal	Tom Horabin	17,072	52.2	+0.9
Conservative	Edward Robin Whitehouse	15,608	47.8	−0.9
Majority		1,464	4.4	+1.8
Turnout		32,680	79.3	−0.6
Liberal hold		Swing	+0.9	

1935 general election: North Cornwall
Party	Candidate	Votes	%	±%
Liberal	Francis Dyke Acland	16,872	51.3	+2.2
Conservative	Edward Robin Whitehouse	16,036	48.7	+3.4
Majority		836	2.6	−1.2
Turnout		32,908	79.9	−5.8
Liberal hold		Swing	-1.1	

1932 North Cornwall by-election
Party	Candidate	Votes	%	±%
Liberal	Francis Dyke Acland	16,933	52.4	+3.3
Conservative	Alfred Martyn Williams	15,387	47.6	+2.3
Majority		1,546	4.8	+1.0
Turnout		32,320	80.8	−4.9
Liberal hold		Swing		

- Death of Maclean 15 June 1932

1931 general election: North Cornwall
Party	Candidate	Votes	%	±%
Liberal	Donald Maclean	16,867	49.1	−0.6
Conservative	Alfred Martyn Williams	15,526	45.3	+3.0
Labour	Arthur Bennett	1,907	5.6	−2.4
Majority		1,341	3.8	−3.6
Turnout		35,300	85.7	−0.4
Liberal hold		Swing		

=== Elections in the 1920s ===
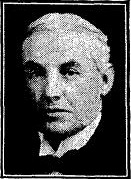
Sir Donald Maclean

1929 general election: North Cornwall
Party	Candidate	Votes	%	±%
Liberal	Donald Maclean	16,586	49.7	+3.3
Unionist	Alfred Martyn Williams	14,095	42.3	−11.3
Labour	F. E. Church	2,654	8.0	N/A
Majority		2,491	7.4	N/A
Turnout		33,335	86.1	+8.1
Liberal gain from Unionist		Swing	+7.3	

General election 1924: North Cornwall
Party	Candidate	Votes	%	±%
Unionist	Alfred Martyn Williams	12,639	53.6	+10.1
Liberal	George Marks	10,927	46.4	−10.1
Majority		1,712	7.2	N/A
Turnout		23,566	78.0	+2.4
Unionist gain from Liberal		Swing		

General election 1923: North Cornwall
Party	Candidate	Votes	%	±%
Liberal	George Marks	12,434	56.5	N/A
Unionist	Charles Alexander Petrie	9,581	43.5	N/A
Majority		2,853	13.0	N/A
Turnout		22,015	75.6	N/A
Liberal hold		Swing	N/A	

General election 1922: North Cornwall
Party	Candidate	Votes	%	±%
National Liberal	George Marks	Unopposed		
National Liberal hold				

=== Elections in the 1910s ===
General election 1918: North Cornwall
Party		Candidate	Votes	%
C	National Liberal	George Marks	Unopposed	
	National Liberal win (new seat)			
C indicates candidate endorsed by the coalition government.

== See also ==
- List of parliamentary constituencies in Cornwall

== Sources ==
- British Parliamentary Election Results 1918–1949, compiled and edited by F.W.S. Craig (Macmillan Press 1977)
