= Black Cinderella Two Goes East =

1978 British radio programme

Black Cinderella Two Goes East (sometimes referred to as Black Cinderella II Goes East) is a radio pantomime broadcast on BBC Radio 2 on 25 December 1978. The programme is notable for being one of only a few radio programmes (co)-produced by Douglas Adams while he was employed by the BBC as a radio producer, also for giving a significant role to a serving politician, Liberal Party MP John Pardoe. The hour-long programme was written by Clive Anderson and Rory McGrath and was co-produced by Douglas Adams and John Lloyd.

The programme featured performances by:

- Richard Baker, Narrator
- Tim Brooke-Taylor, Timothenia and the King
- Rob Buckman, Prince Charming
- John Cleese, Fairy Godperson
- Peter Cook, Prince Disgusting
- Graeme Garden, Gardenia and Manny
- David Hatch, himself
- Maggie Henderson, Cinderella
- Jo Kendall, Wicked Stepmother and Princess Sally
- Richard Murdoch, Baron Ofbeef
- Bill Oddie, himself, Town Crier and Talking Horse
- John Pardoe MP, Fairy-tale Liberal Prime Minister

Douglas Adams had to follow the show's writers to Cambridge in order to get them to work on the script, and had to pick up the finished script from a messenger on a train. Adams also recorded a reluctant John Cleese at home. Cleese had vowed never to work for BBC Radio again, following a dispute over a sketch in the series John Cleese's Sketchbook. Cleese's lines were then played from a tape recorder into the broadcast programme.
