= Jeffrey Sterling, Baron Sterling of Plaistow =

British businessman and Conservative peer

Vice Admiral The Right Honourable The Lord Sterling of Plaistow GCVO CBE
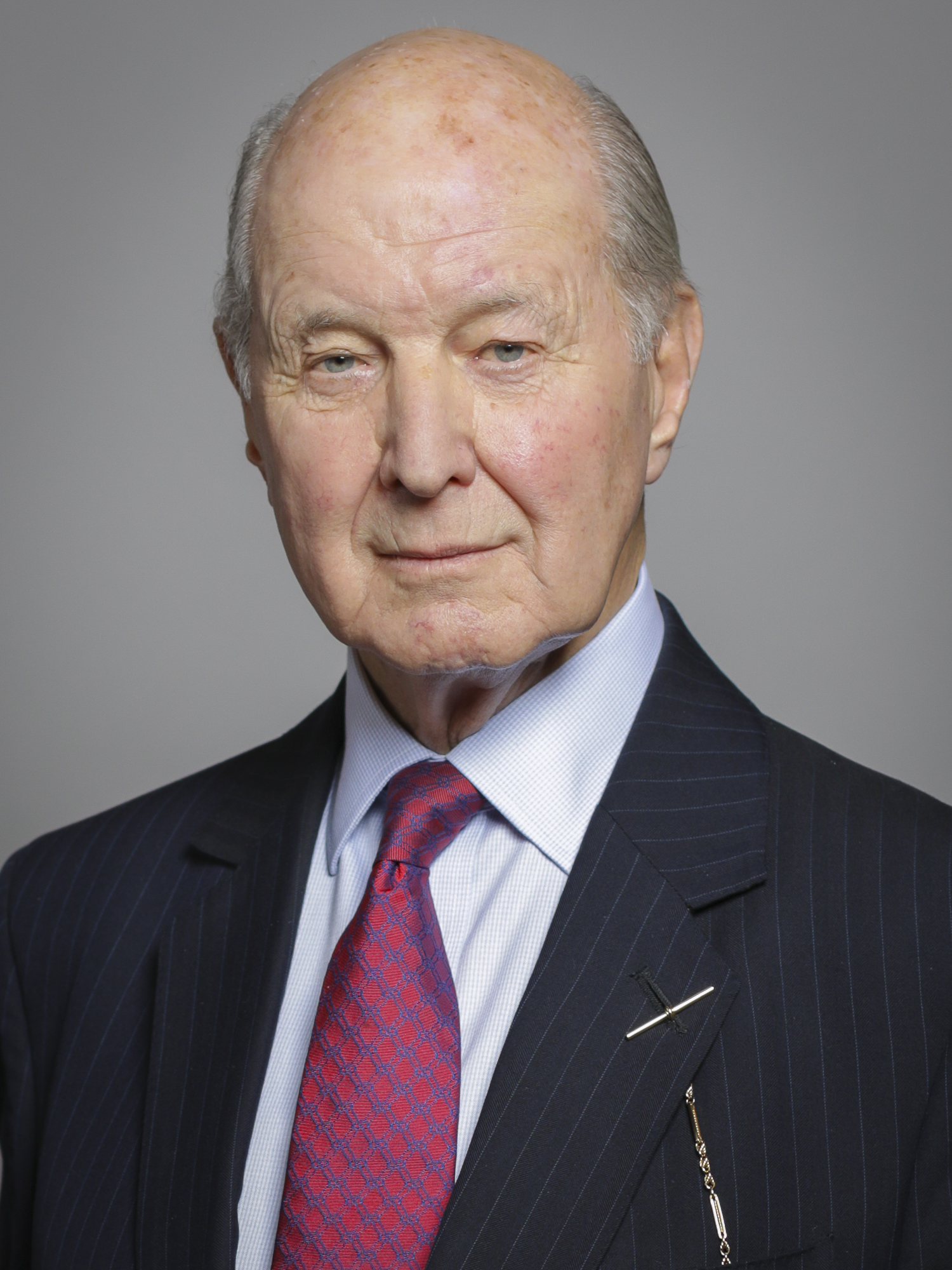

Member of the House of Lords
- Lord Temporal
- Life peerage 17 January 1991

Personal details
- Born: Jeffrey Maurice Sterling; 27 December 1934 (age 91)
- Citizenship: United Kingdom
- Party: Conservative

Jeffrey Maurice Sterling, Baron Sterling of Plaistow, GCVO, CBE (born 27 December 1934 in Stepney, London) is a British businessman and Conservative peer. The Plaistow referred to is Plaistow, West Sussex, reflected in the land holdings in the county.

== Career ==
With the late Lord Goodman, Sterling founded Motability, a charity which, amongst other initiatives, oversees the Motability Scheme in providing cars for people with disabilities, in 1977 and today is currently Life President of the organisation. He was executive chairman of the shipping line P&O from 1983 to 2005, having joined the board as a non-executive director on 6 February 1980, and is now Life President of P&O Cruises. In 2002 he served as chairman of the Golden Jubilee Weekend Trust, in commemoration of Queen Elizabeth's reign of 50 years as sovereign.

In March 2007 Sterling announced that he would be buying the Swan Hellenic brand from Carnival Corporation & plc. In April 2007 he brokered a deal with Roger Allard's All Leisure Holidays, operator of cruise company Voyages of Discovery, to purchase the brand Swan Hellenic. Together they acquired cruise ship Explorer 2, to be renamed Minerva 1. Swan Hellenic began its new summer season in March 2008 with Lord Sterling remaining as chairman.

In October 2010 Sterling said that cruise passengers using Swan Hellenic at Portsmouth should not mix with "ordinary" ferry passengers who were mostly "semi-lager louts" or "lorry drivers smelling of BO". He later said that he meant 'backpackers' or 'people rushing around'.

He led the initiative to build the Queen's Row Barge Gloriana in 2012.

=== House of Lords ===
As part of Margaret Thatcher's resignation honours, he was created a life peer as Baron Sterling of Plaistow, of Pall Mall in the City of Westminster on 17 January 1991. He sits in the House of Lords as a Conservative Party peer. He was a member of the Joint Committee on the National Security Strategy from February 2010 to May 2010, and from December 2010 to May 2014.

== Honours ==
He was appointed a Commander of the Order of the British Empire (CBE) in the 1977 Birthday Honours and was knighted in the 1985 New Year Honours for public services and services to industry, having the honour conferred by The Queen on 12 February. He was appointed Knight Grand Cross of the Royal Victorian Order (GCVO) in August 2002 in a supplement to that year's Birthday Honours list in recognition of his services in connection with the Queen's Golden Jubilee. Baron Sterling has a coat of arms with the Latin motto "Usque Per Ignem" (Trans: All the way through fire).

Sterling has also received numerous foreign honours, including: Grand Officer in the Order of May (Argentina) in 2002; Officer's Cross in the Order of Merit (Germany) in 2004; and Officier in the Légion d'Honneur (France) in 2005.

He held an honorary commission in the Royal Naval Reserve of rear admiral and was appointed honorary vice admiral in the RNR on 2 April 2015. He is associated with HMS President.

Coat of arms of Jeffrey Sterling, Baron Sterling of Plaistow
Crest A salamander statant upon its hind legs Sable, enflamed Proper, and holding between the forefeet the Hebrew letter chain Argent. Escutcheon Chequy Argent and Sable, three lyres bendwise in bend Gules. Supporters Dexter, a retriever Gules supporting with the exterior forefoot an anchor Argent; sinister, a fallow deer Gules supporting with the exterior forefoot an anchor Gules Motto Usque Per Ignem

Orders of precedence in the United Kingdom
Preceded by The Lord Pearson of Rannoch	Gentlemen; Baron Sterling of Plaistow	Followed by The Lord Palumbo
