= Gerry Neale =

British politician (1941–2015)

Sir Gerrard Anthony Neale (25 June 1941 – 28 October 2015) was a British Conservative MP.

Born in Bedford, he was educated at Bedford School and it was while he was there that he decided to become an MP. He stood as a local Conservative candidate for the newly created council of Milton Keynes and became one of the new city's first councillors.

He left local politics shortly before the election of 1979 and stood as Conservative candidate for the Parliamentary seat of North Cornwall, which he gained, defeating the Liberal Party incumbent John Pardoe. Knighted in 1990 as part of Margaret Thatcher's Resignation Honours, he held the seat until 1992, when he himself lost to the Liberal Democrat Paul Tyler. Neale returned to his former career as a solicitor, but was struck off the roll of solicitors by the Law Society of England and Wales in 2002 after admitting allegations of involvement in fraudulent banking transactions.

In retirement he lived in Ealing, and wrote a novel: Squaring Circles (2011, Pearl Press: ISBN 978-0-9568688-2-4). He also wrote songs. He died of cancer on 28 October 2015 at the age of 74.

== Bibliography ==
- Times Guide to the House of Commons, 1992

Parliament of the United Kingdom
Preceded by John Pardoe	Member of Parliament for North Cornwall; 1979–1992	Succeeded by Paul Tyler
