= James Hill (Labour politician) =

Scottish Labour politician (1899–1966)

Member of Parliament for Midlothian
- In office 8 October 1959 – 10 March 1966
- Preceded by: David Johnstone Pryde
- Succeeded by: Alexander Eadie
- Constituency: Midlothian

Personal details
- Born: James Meechan Hill; 2 September 1899 Bellshill
- Died: 22 December 1966 (aged 67) Edinburgh Royal Infirmary
- Party: Labour
- Parent(s): James Hill and Janet Meechan Hill
- Occupation: Miner

James Meechan Hill MP (2 September 1899 – 22 December 1966) was a Scottish Labour Member of Parliament for Midlothian from 1959 to 1966. His successor was Alexander Eadie.

Hill was born and educated in Bellshill, Lanarkshire, the son of coal miner James Hill and Janet Meechan Hill. Also a miner by profession, Hill was elected to the Musselburgh Town Council in 1945, and to the Midlothian County Council in 1946. He was elected as a Labour candidate in the 1959 and re-elected in 1964.

Hill suffered heart problems in his second term, however, being hospitalised repeatedly. He was unable to contest the 1966 general election. He died in Edinburgh Royal Infirmary in December 1966.

Parliament of the United Kingdom
Preceded by David Johnstone Pryde	Member of Parliament for Midlothian; 1959–1966	Succeeded by Alexander Eadie
