= Francis Dyke Acland =

British politician (1874–1939)

The Right Honourable Sir Francis Dyke Acland Bt DL JP
- circa 1908

Deputy Leader of the Liberal Party
- In office 26 November 1935 – 9 June 1939
- Leader: Archibald Sinclair
- Preceded by: Archibald Sinclair
- Succeeded by: Percy Harris

Parliamentary Secretary to the Board of Agriculture and Fisheries
- In office 30 May 1915 – 14 December 1916
- Prime Minister: H. H. Asquith
- Preceded by: Harry Verney
- Succeeded by: Richard Winfrey

Financial Secretary to the Treasury
- In office 3 February 1915 – 26 May 1915
- Prime Minister: H. H. Asquith
- Preceded by: Edwin Montagu
- Succeeded by: Edwin Montagu

Under-Secretary of State for Foreign Affairs
- In office 23 October 1911 – 4 February 1915
- Prime Minister: H. H. Asquith
- Preceded by: Thomas McKinnon Wood
- Succeeded by: Neil Primrose

Financial Secretary to the War Office
- In office 31 January 1911 – 23 October 1911
- Prime Minister: H. H. Asquith
- Preceded by: Charles Mallet
- Succeeded by: Harold Tennant
- In office 12 April 1908 – 4 March 1910
- Prime Minister: H. H. Asquith
- Preceded by: Thomas Buchanan
- Succeeded by: Charles Mallet

Member of Parliament for North Cornwall
- In office 22 July 1932 – 9 June 1939
- Preceded by: Donald Maclean
- Succeeded by: Tom Horabin

Member of Parliament for Tiverton
- In office 21 June 1923 – 29 October 1924
- Preceded by: Herbert Sparkes
- Succeeded by: Gilbert Acland-Troyte

Member of Parliament for Camborne
- In office 19 December 1910 – 15 November 1922
- Preceded by: Albert Dunn
- Succeeded by: Algernon Moreing

Member of Parliament for Richmond
- In office 8 February 1906 – 10 February 1910
- Preceded by: John Hutton
- Succeeded by: William Orde-Powlett

Personal details
- Born: 7 March 1874
- Died: 9 June 1939 (aged 65)
- Party: Liberal
- Spouse(s): 1 Eleanor Acland née Cropper (d. 1933) (2) Constance Dudley (d. 1940)
- Education: Balliol College, Oxford

Sir Francis Dyke Acland, 14th Baronet, PC, DL, JP (7 March 1874 – 9 June 1939) was a British Liberal politician. He notably served as Under-Secretary of State for Foreign Affairs under Sir Edward Grey between 1911 and 1915. Ideologically, he was an adherent of the "New Liberalism" within the Liberal Party.

== Background and education ==
Acland was the son of Sir Arthur Dyke Acland, 13th Baronet, and Alice Sophia Cunningham, daughter of Reverend Francis Macaulay Cunningham. He was educated at Rugby and Balliol College, Oxford. He worked as a junior examiner in the education department in South Kensington from 1900 to 1903, and as assistant director for secondary education in the West Riding of Yorkshire in 1903.

== Political career ==
Acland was elected as the member of parliament (MP) for Richmond, Yorkshire, in 1906, a seat he held until 1910, and later represented Camborne from 1910 to 1922, Tiverton from 1923 to 1924 and North Cornwall from 1932 to 1939. He was Parliamentary Private Secretary to Richard Haldane, the secretary of state for war, from 1906 to 1908. He held government office in the Liberal Ministry of H. H. Asquith firstly as Financial Secretary to the War Office from 1908 to 1910. In 1911, he was promoted to Under-Secretary of State for Foreign Affairs to work closely under Sir Edward Grey. He remained in this position throughout the build-up of tensions in Europe which led to the outbreak of war. In February 1915, he was moved to the post of Financial Secretary to the Treasury before being moved again, when Asquith formed his coalition. in June 1915 to Parliamentary Secretary to the Board of Agriculture and Fisheries to accommodate Unionist nominees. In 1915, he was sworn of the Privy Council.

In 1917, he was appointed Chairman of the Departmental Committee "to inquire into the extent and gravity of the evils of dental practice by persons not qualified under the Dentists Act [1878]." Based on the recommendations of this committee a bill was introduced into parliament which eventually became the Dentists Act 1921 (11 & 12 Geo. 5. c. 21) which established the Dental Board of the United Kingdom. Acland was appointed its first chairman – a position he held until his death.

Acland also was influential in setting up the Forestry Commission and served as a commissioner until his death, a Deputy Lieutenant of Devon and a justice of the peace for Devon and the North Riding of Yorkshire. In 1926, he succeeded his father as fourteenth Baronet.

== Family ==
Acland married firstly Eleanor Margaret Cropper, daughter of Charles James Cropper, in 1895. They had three sons and one daughter. After Eleanor's death in December 1933 he married secondly Constance, daughter of George Dudley, in 1937. Acland died in June 1939, aged 65, and was succeeded by his eldest son from his first marriage, Richard. Lady Dyke Acland died in October 1940. His second son, Geoffrey Acland, became a leading figure in the Liberal Party. His great-grandson, Chris Acland became the drummer for shoegaze band Lush.

== Audio recordings ==
- The Liberal Land Policy, 20 April 1929, WA-8854-55
- Care of the Teeth, 15 August 1929, WAX 5141-42

Parliament of the United Kingdom
| Preceded by John Hutton | Member of Parliament for Richmond; 1906 – January 1910 | Succeeded by Hon. William Orde-Powlett |
| Preceded by Albert Dunn | Member of Parliament for Camborne; December 1910 – 1922 | Succeeded by Algernon Moreing |
| Preceded by Herbert Sparkes | Member of Parliament for Tiverton; 1923 – 1924 | Succeeded by Gilbert Acland-Troyte |
| Preceded by Sir Donald Maclean | Member of Parliament for North Cornwall; 1932 – 1939 | Succeeded by Tom Horabin |
Political offices
| Preceded by Thomas Buchanan | Financial Secretary to the War Office; 1908–1910 | Succeeded by Charles Mallet |
| Preceded by Charles Mallet | Financial Secretary to the War Office; 1911 | Succeeded by Harold Tennant |
| Preceded by Thomas McKinnon Wood | Under-Secretary of State for Foreign Affairs; 1911–1915 | Succeeded by Hon. Neil Primrose |
| Preceded by Hon. Edwin Samuel Montagu | Financial Secretary to the Treasury; 1915 | Succeeded by Hon. Edwin Samuel Montagu |
| Preceded by Sir Harry Verney, Bt | Parliamentary Secretary to the Board of Agriculture and Fisheries; 1915–1916 | Succeeded by Sir Richard Winfrey |
Party political offices
| Preceded by Archibald Sinclair | Deputy Leader of the Liberal Party; 1935–1939 | Succeeded by Percy Harris |
Baronetage of England
| Preceded by Arthur Dyke Acland | Baronet (of Columb John); 1926–1939 | Succeeded by Richard Dyke Acland |
