= John Pardoe =

British politician and businessman (1934–2026)

Deputy Leader of the Liberal Party
- In office 7 July 1976 – 3 May 1979
- Leader: David Steel
- Preceded by: Donald Wade
- Succeeded by: Alan Beith

Liberal Spokesperson for the Treasury
- In office June 1970 – 3 May 1979
- Leader: Jeremy Thorpe; Jo Grimond (Acting); David Steel
- Preceded by: Richard Wainwright
- Succeeded by: Richard Wainwright

President of the Liberal Party
- In office 1971–1972
- Leader: Jeremy Thorpe
- Preceded by: Inga-Stina Robson
- Succeeded by: Trevor Jones

Member of Parliament for Cornwall North
- In office 31 March 1966 – 7 April 1979
- Preceded by: James Scott-Hopkins
- Succeeded by: Gerry Neale

Personal details
- Born: 27 July 1934 Bridgwater, Somerset, England
- Died: 15 November 2026 (aged 92)
- Party: Liberal
- Other political affiliations: Labour; Mebyon Kernow
- Education: Corpus Christi College, Cambridge

John Wentworth Pardoe (27 July 1934 – 15 November 2026) was a British businessman and Liberal Party politician. He was Chairman of Sight and Sound Education Ltd from 1979 to 1989.

== Early life and education ==
John Wentworth Pardoe was born in Bridgwater, Somerset, England, on 27 July 1934, the son of solicitor Cuthbert B. Pardoe and Marjorie E. W. (née Taylor). His parents were staunch Conservative Party supporters. He attended Holy Rosary School in Bridgwater, and later King's College School, Cambridge, and was a chorister in the Choir of King's College, Cambridge. He then went to Sherborne School, a boarding independent school for boys in the market town of Sherborne in Dorset, followed by Corpus Christi College, Cambridge. He won a singing scholarship to Cambridge as a baritone, graduating with an MA in economics and English. He was active in the famous Footlights drama club; one critic of their 1955 revue panned future comedian Jonathan Miller, whilst predicting a bold comedic future for Pardoe.

During his National Service, Pardoe was commissioned in the Fighter Control Branch of the Royal Air Force.

== Political career ==
Pardoe had first entered politics as a member of the Labour Party. In an interview with Adrian Slade in 2002, he recalled working as postal votes officer at the 1959 general election for Lena Jeger, the Labour MP for St Pancras South, but his adherence to the left of the party (he supported Aneurin Bevan) and disappointment with Hugh Gaitskell as leader prompted him to leave shortly afterwards. He then joined the Liberals, in the belief that he was "moving left".

At the 1964 general election, Pardoe unsuccessfully stood as the Liberal candidate against Margaret Thatcher in Finchley. He capitalised on the outrage at Jews being barred from a local golf club, and halved her majority to 8,802. In the 1966 election, the Liberal Party increased its number of MPs from nine to twelve: one of them was Pardoe, who captured the North Cornwall seat from the Conservative Party's James Scott-Hopkins. He rapidly became the party's economic affairs spokesman in parliament and was respected for the intellect of his views, if not for the often partisan nature of his comments. Pardoe was Treasurer of the Liberal Party from 1968 to 1969.

In the 1960s, Pardoe was a member of Mebyon Kernow as well as the Liberal Party. His commitment to pluralism led him to form (alongside Richard Holme and Christopher Layton) the Radical Action Movement, which sought to reach out to the wider left but only drew support from two Labour MPs. It did, however, presage Pardoe's willingness to back the Lib-Lab pact in 1977–78, which he insisted had "restored confidence in Britain".

He was a candidate in the 1976 Liberal Party leadership election, following the resignation of Jeremy Thorpe. His campaign, headed by Timothy Beaumont and Cyril Smith, was radical-populist in tone, and was described at the time as "an invitation to the party to live dangerously", although many observers thought it heavy-handed and aggressive. His only rival in the contest was fellow MP David Steel, who called Pardoe a "kamikaze pilot". It was Steel who emerged the victor, receiving 12,541 votes to Pardoe's 7,032.

Pardoe played the fairy-tale Liberal prime minister in BBC Radio 4's Christmas pantomime, Black Cinderella Two Goes East in 1978, on the basis that Liberal prime ministers exist only in fairy tales.

At the 1979 general election, he lost his seat, possibly because of his outspoken support for Thorpe, a neighbouring MP, who was then about to stand trial at the Old Bailey for conspiracy and incitement to murder. Pardoe himself believed the root cause of his downfall was his failure to win the party leadership contest three years earlier.

At the general election of 1987, Pardoe served as campaign manager of the SDP–Liberal Alliance.

== Outside politics ==
Before entering Parliament, Pardoe worked for Television Audience Measurement Ltd from 1958 to 1960, Osborne Peacock Co. Ltd from 1960 to 1961 and Liberal News from 1961 to 1966.

From 1967 to 1973, Pardoe was a consultant to the National Association of Schoolmasters. He was a director at William Schlackman Ltd from 1968 to 1971, Gerald Metals (1972–83) and a Member of the London Metal Exchange from 1973 to 1983.

Pardoe was a presenter of LWT's Look Here television programme from 1979 to 1981. In the same period, he was also a Senior Research Fellow at the Policy Studies Institute. From 1979 to 1989 he was Chairman of Sight and Sound Education Ltd. and was also a member of the Youth Training Board from 1985 to 1989.

== Personal life and death ==
In 1958, Pardoe married Joyce R. Peerman; the couple had two sons and a daughter. Pardoe lived in Hampstead, north west London, enjoyed walking, reading, music and carpentry.

Pardoe died on 15 November 2026, aged 92.

Parliament of the United Kingdom
Preceded by James Scott-Hopkins	Member of Parliament for North Cornwall; 1966–1979	Succeeded by Gerry Neale
Party political offices
Preceded by Len Smith	Treasurer of the Liberal Party; 1968–1969	Succeeded by Frank Medlicott
Preceded by Inga-Stina Robson	President of the Liberal Party; 1971–1972	Succeeded by Trevor Jones
Preceded by Position re-created Previous incumbent: Donald Wade	Deputy Leader of the Liberal Party; 1976?–1979	Succeeded by Position abolished Next incumbent: Alan Beith
