= Herbert Sparkes =

Herbert Weston Sheppard Sparkes (1859 – 22 May 1923) was briefly the Conservative MP for Tiverton.

He was elected MP for Tiverton at the 1922 general election. Sparkes was 63 years old when elected.

Sparkes did not serve long as an MP, and died in May 1923, aged 64. At the ensuing by-election in June 1923 the seat was won by the Liberal Party.

== See also ==
- List of United Kingdom MPs with the shortest service

Parliament of the United Kingdom
Preceded by Charles Carew	Member of Parliament for Tiverton; 1922 – 1923	Succeeded by Francis Dyke Acland
