= Alex Eadie =

Scottish politician (1920–2012)

Alexander Eadie
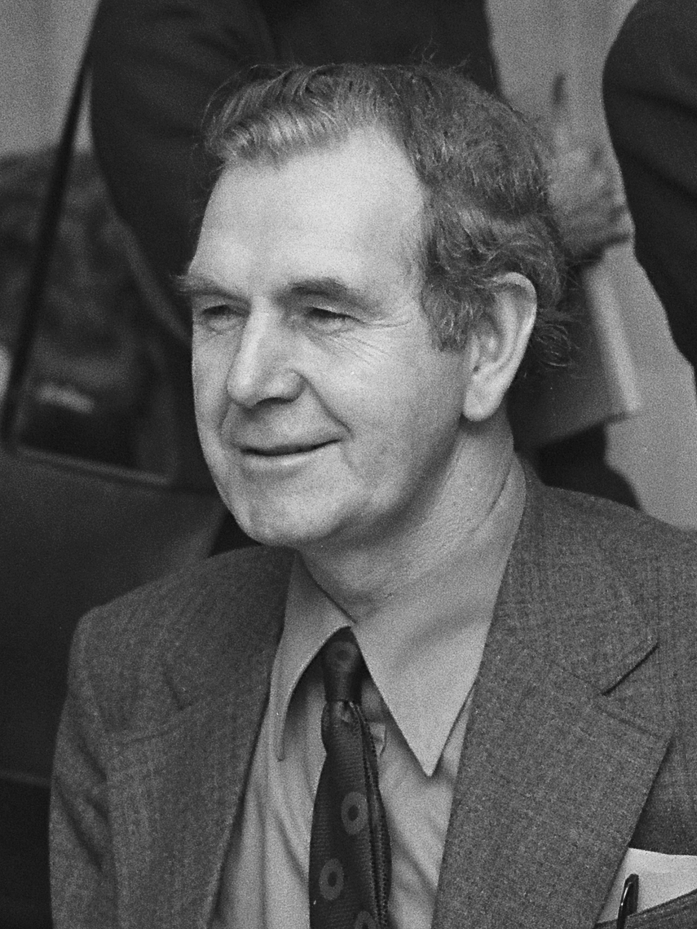
- Eadie in 1976

Member of Parliament for Midlothian
- In office 31 March 1966 – 16 March 1992
- Preceded by: James Hill
- Succeeded by: Eric Clarke

Personal details
- Born: Alexander Eadie; 23 June 1920 Buckhaven, Fife, Scotland
- Died: 26 January 2012 (aged 91) East Wemyss, Fife, Scotland
- Party: Scottish Labour Party
- Spouses: Jemima Ritchie (m. 1941; died 1981) Janice Murdoch (m. 1983)
- Relations: Helen Eadie (Daughter in Law)
- Children: Bob Eadie
- Occupation: Coal Miner, Union Executive

Alexander Eadie (23 June 1920 – 26 January 2012), known as Alex Eadie, was a Scottish Labour politician.

== Early life ==
Born in Buckhaven, Fife, he was the son of a coal miner, who was later killed in a pit accident. Educated at Buckhaven Senior Secondary School, he left school aged 14 to work part-time at Lochhead Colliery, while he trained as a mining engineer.

Eadie stood for the Scottish presidency of the National Union of Mineworkers in 1961 against Alex Moffat, brother of the outgoing president Abe Moffat. Media commentators gave him little chance as a Fabian Society member in a union executive dominated by communists, but he came within 3,000 votes of victory. He was subsequently in 1965 elected to the Scottish NUM executive, representative for the county of Clackmannanshire.

== Political career ==
Eadie joined the Scottish Labour Party in 1943, and was elected Scottish president of the Young Co-Operators in 1945. He later served as a member of the SLP Executive.

He was a councillor on Fife County Council for 20 years, chairing the housing and education committees.

== Parliamentary career ==
Eadie contested Ayr in 1959 and 1964, losing the second time to George Younger.

In 1966 a vacancy arose in the mining constituency of Midlothian. Elected Member of Parliament in the 1966 general election with a majority of over 14,416, he warned in his maiden speech at the Palace of Westminster against closing the pits. His seat remained safe until his retirement in 1992, the only scare coming in 1974 when the Scottish National Party reduced his majority to just over 4,000.

After co-sponsoring David Steel's Private Member's Bill which became the Abortion Act 1967, in January 1967 he became Parliamentary Private Secretary to Minister of Social Security, Margaret Herbison. However, along with seven other PPS's, he was sacked by Prime Minister Harold Wilson four months later for refusing to back Britain's application for Common Market membership.

Wilson appointed Eadie opposition spokesman on energy in 1973, and served as junior minister for Energy during the Labour government of 1974 to 1979, serving under ministers Eric Varley and then Tony Benn. Eadie promoted research into wave, tidal and geothermal energy, and in 1976 secured the Joint European Torus (JET) nuclear fusion project for Oxfordshire, when the European Commission recommendation was for Italy.

Eadie held the energy brief again in opposition under new Labour leader Neil Kinnock. Considered in 1983 as a replacement for Derek Ezra as chairman of the National Coal Board, the position was given to Sir Ian MacGregor, whom Eadie later blamed for the conflict that led to the miners' strike of 1984–85. As Labour's then shadow Energy spokesperson, he backed the strike, but was later critical of Arthur Scargill's leadership. After the strike, Eadie successfully led legal action against the NCB, which under a ruling from the Attorney General for England and Wales Sir Patrick Mayhew, recovered £120M in miners pension credits, which had been withheld during the strike.

In the early 1970s, Eadie put forward a Private Members Bill that would have established the principle that no child in Scotland should be treated as incapable of being educated. After he became a junior minister in February 1974, he handed over the brief to Hamish Gray, then Conservative MP for Ross and Cromarty, with whom he became firm friends. Legislation later passed, steered and supported by Eadie and Gray, which put Scotland at the forefront of special needs education provision within the UK.

== Personal life ==
Eadie was married twice, firstly in 1941 to Jemima Ritchie; she died in 1981. In 1983 he married his second wife Janice Murdoch. His son from his first marriage is Bob Eadie, a Labour councillor in Fife. His daughter-in-law Helen Eadie was Labour Member of the Scottish Parliament for Cowdenbeath.

After a period of illness, Eadie died at his home in East Wemyss, Fife, on 26 January 2012.

Parliament of the United Kingdom
Preceded by James Hill	Member of Parliament for Midlothian; 1966–1992	Succeeded by Eric Clarke
