= Gilbert Strachan =

British professor of medicine (1888–1963)

Gilbert Innes Strachan, CBE (August 1888 – 9 December 1963) was a prominent British researcher and professor of medicine.

== Early life and education ==
Born in Bristol to James and Agnes (née Todd) Strachan, he graduated from the University of Glasgow with an M.B., Ch.B. in 1910, followed by his doctorate in 1913. Strachan then worked in the London Hospital before serving in the First World War as a captain in the Royal Army Medical Corps.

Post-war, Strachan moved to Cardiff in 1919 to study abortions while working as an assistant pathologist. He was present and involved in the establishment of Cardiff's clinical school, working as an assistant to Sir Ewen Maclean at this time. From at least 1921 he was registered with the Central Midwives Board as an approved lecturer for midwives.

== Career in medicine ==
In 1932, the Welsh National School of Medicine promoted Strachan to Professor of Obstetrics and Gynaecology. As part of this role, Strachan was said to be an inspiring lecturer. He retained his post until his retirement in 1953, though he also owned a private practice and worked in research.

His most notable research includes his influence in the advancement of radium treatment for cancer of the womb, documented in his published works on the subject, namely in his Textbook of Obstetrics (1947). He was thus in demand as an examiner in his area of expertise, working for the universities of Birmingham, Bristol, Oxford and Wales. He also travelled to Australia in 1950 where he lectured and examined students in Sydney and Melbourne, representing the Royal College of Obstetricians and Gynaecologists. Strachan was a founding member of this institution and, in 1952–55, vice-president. He was also a Fellow and Vice President of the British Medical Association In 1953, he received the CBE.

Throughout his career he lectured to nurses and midwives. He was a Vice President of the Royal College of Nursing from 1953 until his death in 1963.

== Personal life ==
Strachan developed a collection of Spode porcelain and china, which he donated to the National Museum of Wales.

In 1920, he married Olive Andrews, daughter of F. E. Andrews, with whom he had a son. He died in his home at 29 Cathedral Road, Cardiff, on 9 December 1963, aged 75.
