= Kirsty McNeill =

Scottish politician

Kirsty McNeill MP
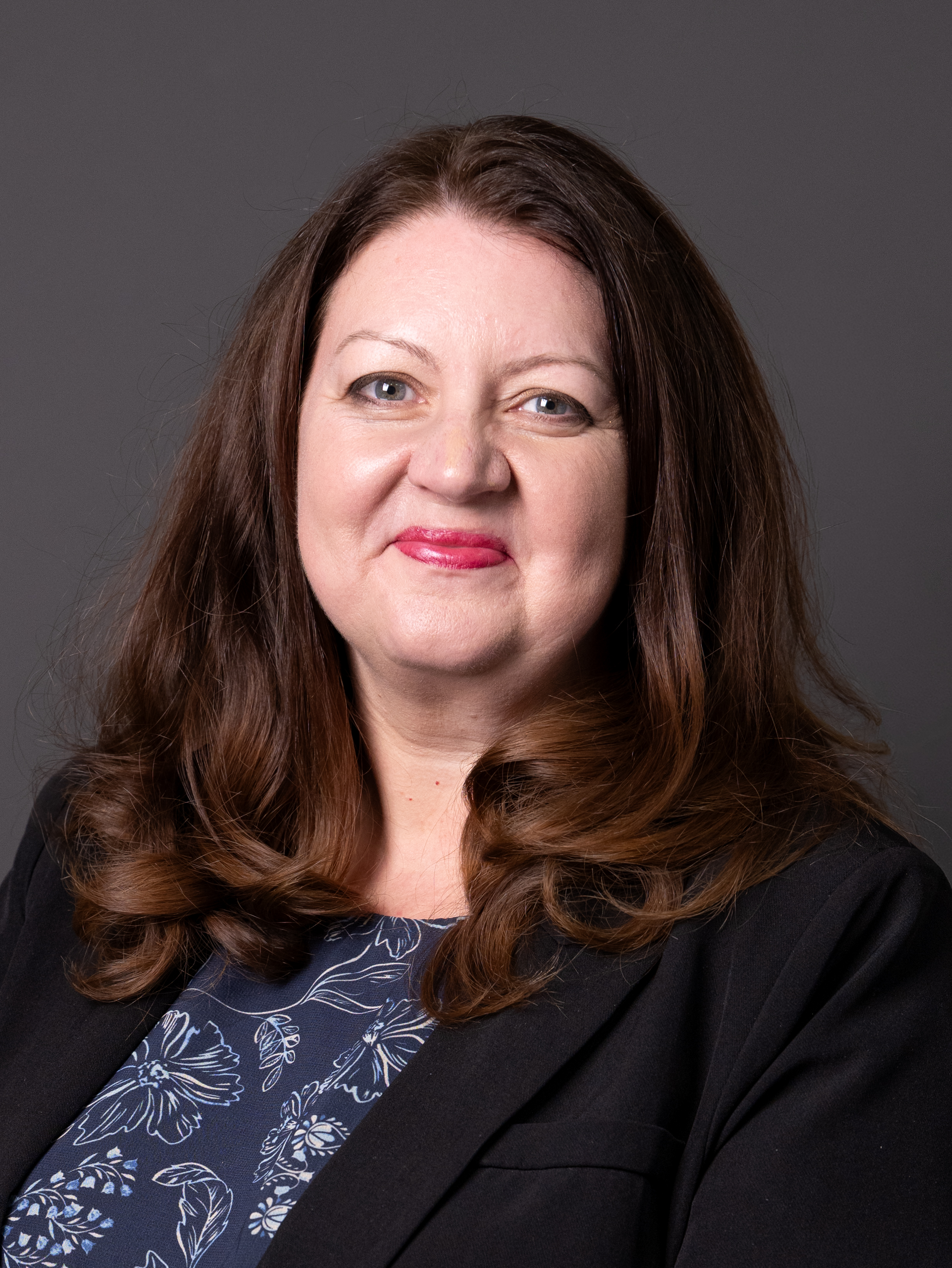
- Official portrait, 2026

Minister of State for International Development
- Incumbent
- Assumed office 21 July 2026
- Prime Minister: Andy Burnham
- Preceded by: The Baroness Chapman of Darlington

Parliamentary Under-Secretary of State for Scotland
- In office 9 July 2024 – 20 July 2026
- Prime Minister: Keir Starmer
- Preceded by: John Lamont
- Succeeded by: Melanie Ward

Member of Parliament for Midlothian
- Incumbent
- Assumed office 4 July 2024
- Preceded by: Owen Thompson
- Majority: 8,167 (18.5%)

Personal details
- Party: Labour and Co-operative
- Education: Balliol College, University of Oxford
- Website: kirstymcneill.com

Kirsty McNeill is a Scottish Labour politician serving as Member of Parliament (MP) for Midlothian since 2024. She has served as Minister of State for International Development since July 2026.

== Early life and career ==
McNeill served as president of the Oxford University Student Union in 2001, during which time she successfully campaigned to prevent holocaust denier David Irving from speaking at a debate.

She was previously an advisor to Gordon Brown when he was Prime Minister. Prior to being elected, McNeill was executive director of policy, advocacy and campaigns at Save the Children.

== Political career ==
In the 2005 general election, McNeill stood for Labour in the North Southwark and Bermondsey constituency, losing to the Liberal Democrat candidate, Simon Hughes.

In the 2024 general election, McNeill was elected Member of Parliament (MP) for Midlothian with 21,480 votes (48.6%) and a majority of 8,167 over the second place SNP candidate. On 9 July 2024, she was appointed as a Parliamentary Under-Secretary of State in the Scotland Office. On 21 July 2026, she was appointed Minister of State in the Foreign, Commonwealth and Development Office.

She is a member of the Fabian Society.

== Personal life ==
McNeill is LGBT+.
