= David Pryde (politician) =

Scottish politician

Member of Parliament
- In office 5 July 1945 – 2 August 1959
- Preceded by: Archibald Maule Ramsay
- Succeeded by: James Hill
- Constituency: Peebles and Southern Midlothian (1945–1950); Midlothian and Peebles (1950–1955); Midlothian (1955–1959)

Personal details
- Born: David Johnstone Pryde; 3 March 1890 Scotland
- Died: 2 August 1959 (aged 69)
- Party: Labour

David Johnstone Pryde (3 March 1890 – 2 August 1959) was a Scottish politician.

The youngest son of Matthew James John Maitland Pryde, of Gorebridge, Midlothian, he was educated at Lasswade Secondary School and at the Scottish Labour College.

He worked as a colliery clerk and as a miners' trade union official. From 1927 until 1932, he was president of the West Lothian Mineworkers Union, and from 1923 until 1933, he served on the national executive of the National Union of Scottish Mineworkers. He was elected to Bonnyrigg and Lasswade Town Council in 1938, and twice served as election agent to Joseph Westwood.

He was the unsuccessful Labour candidate for Peebles and South Midlothian in 1935, but was elected for that seat in 1945. Following the boundary changes, he sat for the short-lived seat of Midlothian and Peebles from 1950 until 1955, and then for Midlothian from 1955 until his death in August 1959. The seat remained vacant until the general election in October 1959.

Parliament of the United Kingdom
| Preceded by Archibald Maule Ramsay | Member of Parliament for Peebles & South Midlothian; 1945–1950 | Constituency abolished |
| New constituency | Member of Parliament for Midlothian & Peebles; 1950–1955 | Constituency abolished |
| New constituency | Member of Parliament for Midlothian; 1955–1959 | Succeeded by James Hill |
