= David Hamilton (British politician) =

British politician (born 1950)

Sir David Hamilton
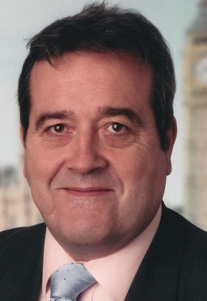

Member of Parliament for Midlothian
- In office 7 June 2001 – 30 March 2015
- Preceded by: Eric Clarke
- Succeeded by: Owen Thompson

Personal details
- Born: 24 October 1950 (age 75) Dalkeith, Midlothian, Scotland
- Party: Labour
- Spouse: Jean Trench Macrae
- Children: 2

Sir David Hamilton (born 24 October 1950) is a Scottish Labour Party politician who was the Member of Parliament (MP) for Midlothian from 2001 to 2015.

== Background ==
David Hamilton was born in Dalkeith, Midlothian, and was educated at the local Dalkeith High School. In 1965, on leaving school, he worked as a miner with the National Coal Board for nineteen years, and remained a member of the National Union of Mineworkers until 1988. He was remanded in custody for two months during the 1984–1985 miners' strike for an alleged assault on a Dalkeith man; although bail was denied many times, he was acquitted at trial. Hamilton later claimed he had been "fitted up" by the police and security services. He worked as an employment training supervisor with Midlothian District Council for two years from 1987, and was appointed as a placement officer for the Craigmillar Festival Society in 1989, becoming the chief executive of Craigmillar Opportunities 1992–2000.

== Political career ==
He was elected as a Midlothian Councillor in 1995, serving for six years. He was elected to the House of Commons at the 2001 general election for Midlothian following the retirement of Eric Clarke. Hamilton held the seat with a majority of 9,014 before deciding to step down before the 2015 general election. He made his maiden speech on 12 July 2001, in which he remembered one of his predecessors as the Midlothian MP and former Prime Minister, William Ewart Gladstone.

He is a member of the left-wing Socialist Campaign Group, and in 2003 became a member of both the Scottish affairs and the work and pensions select committees until the 2005 general election, since when he has been a member of the defence and European legislation committees.

He was also a member of the Public Bill Committee for the Defence Reform Act 2014.

In January 2015, he announced that he would not contest the Midlothian seat at the upcoming election. The Scottish National Party candidate Owen Thompson went on to win the Midlothian seat in 2015 with a 9,859 majority. This win, following national trends, was a huge swing of +30% to the SNP.

Hamilton was knighted in the 2016 Birthday Honours for political and parliamentary service.

== Personal life ==
He has been married to Jean Trench Macrae since 1969 and they have two daughters. He takes a keen interest in biotechnology.

Parliament of the United Kingdom
| Preceded by Eric Clarke | Member of Parliament for Midlothian; 2001 – 2015 | Succeeded by Owen Thompson |
