= Eric Clarke (politician) =

British politician

Member of Parliament for Midlothian
- In office 9 April 1992 – 14 May 2001
- Preceded by: Alex Eadie
- Succeeded by: David Hamilton

Personal details
- Born: 9 April 1933 (age 92)
- Party: Labour

Eric Lionel Clarke (born 9 April 1933) is a politician in the United Kingdom. He served as Labour Member of Parliament for Midlothian from 1992 until he stepped down at the 2001 general election.

He had been an opposition whip from 1994 to 1997. He served as General Secretary of the Scottish National Union of Mineworkers during the 1984–1985 UK miners' strike and took a proactive role in the care of members' families.

Trade union offices
Preceded by Bill McLean	Secretary of the Scottish Area of the National Union of Mineworkers; 1977–1989	Succeeded by Nicky Wilson
Parliament of the United Kingdom
Preceded by Alex Eadie	Member of Parliament for Midlothian; 1992 – 2001	Succeeded by David Hamilton
