= Harold Roper =

British politician

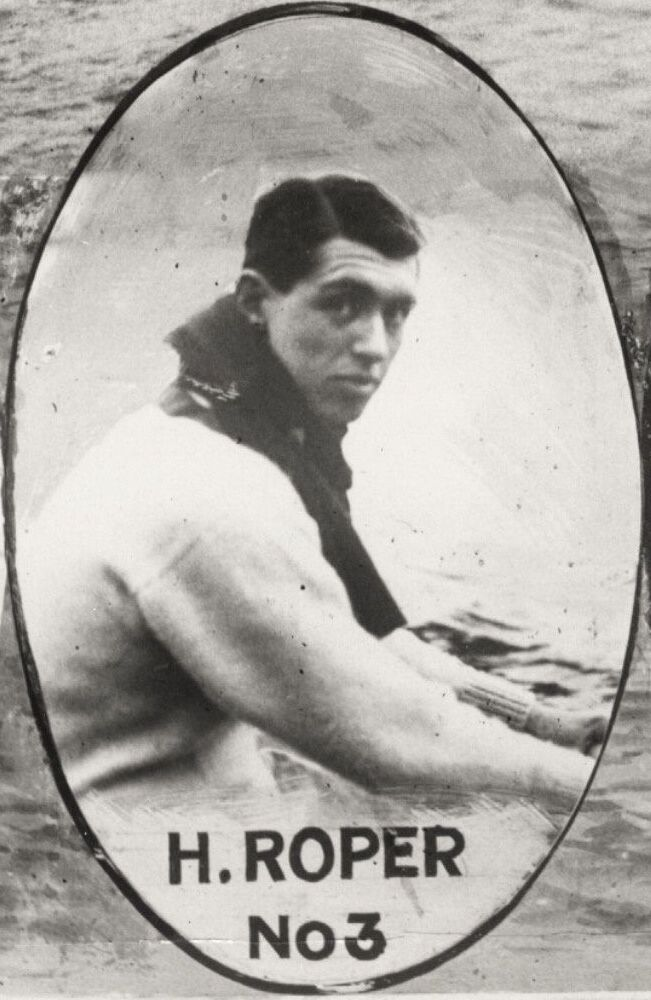

Sir Harold Roper, CBE, MC (2 September 1891 – 20 August 1971) was a British Conservative Party politician. After a career in British Burma, he returned to the United Kingdom and was member of parliament (MP) for North Cornwall from 1950 to 1959.

== Life and career ==
The son of Arthur Charles Roper, FRCS, MRCP, Harold Roper was educated at Blundell's School and Sidney Sussex College, Cambridge, rowing for the university in the 1913 Boat Race. During the First World War, Roper served as an officer in the Devonshire Regiment. Whilst an acting captain, he was awarded the Military Cross in the 1918 King's Birthday Honours.

Moving to Burma, Roper was General Manager of Burmah Oil Company in Rangoon from 1936 to 1945. He was a member of the Burma Legislative Council 1935–36 and of the Burma Senate from 1937 to 1942. During the Second World War, Roper was a CBE and mentioned in despatches. His CBE citation read:

Harold Roper, M.C., General Manager, Burma Oil Company, Ltd., Rangoon. Mr. Roper played a leading part in the oil denial schemes in Burma. By his personal example and influence he contributed very largely to the maintenance of the morale of his employees, without whose services the successful denial of oil supplies to the enemy would have been impossible. He remained in Rangoon to the very end and left by sea with the last demolition party.

He was knighted in the 1945 New Year Honours for his work for the company.

Returning to the United Kingdom, in the 1950 general election, he stood as the Conservative candidate in North Cornwall. Tom Horabin, who had been elected as the constituency's Liberal MP at the 1945 general election, had defected to the Labour Party in 1947. In 1950, Horabin stood instead in Exeter, and Roper won the North Cornwall seat with a majority of more than 3,000 votes over the Liberal candidate, Dingle Foot. Roper held the seat until he stood down at the 1959 general election, when the Conservative James Scott-Hopkins was elected to succeed him.

Parliament of the United Kingdom
Preceded by Tom Horabin	Member of Parliament for North Cornwall; 1950–1959	Succeeded by James Scott-Hopkins
