= Donald Maclean (MP, died 1932) =

British politician

The Right Honourable Sir Donald Maclean KBE

Leader of the Opposition Leader of the Liberal Party in the House of Commons
- In office 9 January 1919 – 25 February 1920
- Monarch: George V
- Prime Minister: David Lloyd George
- Preceded by: H. H. Asquith
- Succeeded by: H. H. Asquith

President of the Board of Education
- In office 25 August 1931 – 15 June 1932
- Prime Minister: Ramsay MacDonald
- Preceded by: Hastings Lees-Smith
- Succeeded by: Edward Wood

President of the Liberal Party
- In office 31 May 1923 – 14 May 1926
- Leader: H. H. Asquith
- Preceded by: John Robertson
- Succeeded by: John Spender

Deputy Leader of the Opposition Deputy Leader of the Liberal Party in the House of Commons
- In office 25 February 1920 – 15 November 1922
- Leader: H. H. Asquith
- Preceded by: Unknown
- Succeeded by: Stephen Walsh (Opposition); John Simon (Liberal)

Deputy Chairman of Ways and Means
- In office 27 October 1911 – 14 December 1918
- Speaker: James Lowther
- Preceded by: John Henry Whitley
- Succeeded by: Edwin Cornwall
Parliamentary offices
Member of Parliament for North Cornwall
In office 30 May 1929 – 15 June 1932
Preceded by	Alfred Williams
Succeeded by	Francis Acland
Member of Parliament for Peebles and Southern Midlothian Peebles and Selkirk (1910–1918)
In office 19 December 1910 – 26 October 1922
Preceded by	William Younger
Succeeded by	Joseph Westwood
Member of Parliament for Bath
In office 8 February 1906 – 10 February 1910
Preceded by	Edmond Wodehouse
Succeeded by	Lord Alexander Thynne

Personal details
- Born: 9 January 1864 Farnworth, Lancashire, UK
- Died: 15 June 1932 (aged 68) London, UK
- Party: Liberal
- Spouse: Gwendolen Margaret Devitt (m. 1907)
- Children: 5, including Donald
- Relatives: Ewen Maclean (brother)
- Profession: Solicitor

Sir Donald Maclean (9 January 1864 – 15 June 1932) was a British Liberal Party politician in the United Kingdom. He was Leader of the Opposition between 1919 and 1920 and served in the Cabinet of Ramsay MacDonald's National Government as President of the Board of Education from 1931 until his death in June the following year.

== Early life and career ==
Born in Farnworth, near Bolton, Lancashire, Maclean was the eldest son of John Maclean, a cordwainer originally of Tiree in the Inner Hebrides, and his wife Agnes Macmillan. His younger brother was Sir Ewen Maclean.

Maclean practiced as a solicitor with practices in Cardiff and Lincoln's Inn Fields, London. A member of the Presbyterian Church of England, he was vice-president of the Cardiff Free Church Council in 1902–3, and also worked closely with the National Society for the Prevention of Cruelty to Children.

== Political career ==
He was a last-minute choice as one of the Liberal Party candidates in Bath at the 1900 general election, but was defeated at the polls. At the 1906 general election, he stood again and was elected as a Liberal Member of Parliament for the constituency. Whilst an MP, he voted in favour of the 1908 Women's Enfranchisement Bill.

He lost his seat at the January 1910 general election, but moved constituency at the December 1910 general election and was returned for Peebles and Selkirk, a seat he held until 1918. He then represented Peebles and Southern Midlothian between 1918 and 1922, losing in the 1922 United Kingdom general election, and then the Northern Division of Cornwall between 1929 and 1932. He also unsuccessfully contested Kilmarnock in 1923 and Cardiff East in 1924.

Maclean was appointed a Privy Counsellor in 1916, and was knighted in 1917. He was Leader of the Liberal Parliamentary Party from 1918 to 1920, as the leader of the Liberal Party, H. H. Asquith had lost his seat in the House of Commons. For those two years he also served as Leader of the Opposition, while Labour had no official leader and Sinn Féin had proclaimed the Irish Republic and the First Dail.

Towards the end of his life, Maclean joined the National Government headed by Ramsay MacDonald. He served as President of the Board of Education from 1931 to 1932.

=== Elections contested ===
==== UK Parliament elections ====
Date of election	Constituency	Party	Votes	%	Result
1906	Bath	Liberal	4,102	28.5*	Elected
1910 (Jan)	Bath	Liberal	3,771	24.5*	Not elected (2nd)
1910 (Dec)	Peebles and Selkirk	Liberal	1,965	52.7	Elected
1918	Peebles and Southern Midlothian	Liberal	7,429	60.6	Elected
1922	Peebles and Southern Midlothian	Liberal	5,377	30.3	Not elected (3rd)
1923	Kilmarnock	Liberal	8,185	32.1	Not elected (2nd)
1924	Cardiff East	Liberal	6,684	26.9	Not elected (3rd)
1929	North Cornwall	Liberal	16,586	49.7	Elected
1931	North Cornwall	Liberal	16,867	49.1	Elected

== Personal life and death ==
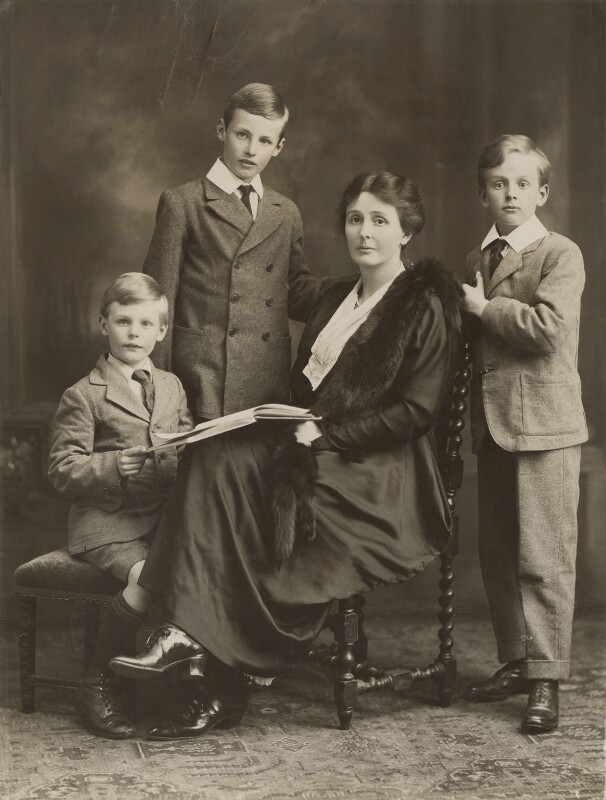
Left-right: Donald Maclean; Ian Lockarbie Maclean; Gwendolen Margaret Devitt, Andrew Ewen Maclean in 1920

Maclean married Gwendolen Margaret Devitt (26 September 1880 – 23 July 1962), daughter of Andrew Devitt (1850–1931) and Jane Dales Morrison (1856–1947), on 2 October 1907. They are buried in the churchyard of Holy Trinity Church, Penn, Buckinghamshire, together with their eldest son, Ian. The diplomat and spy, Donald Duart Maclean, was another of his sons; his ashes are also buried there. The couple also had two more sons and a daughter.

He died from cardiovascular disease on 15 June 1932 at the age of sixty-eight. His memorial service at St. Margaret's on 20 June was absolutely crowded.

== Bibliography ==
- History of the Liberal Party 1895–1970, by Roy Douglas (Sidgwick & Jackson 1971)
- Who's Who of British Members of Parliament, Volume III 1919–1945, edited by M. Stenton and S. Lees (Harvester Press 1979)

Parliament of the United Kingdom
Preceded by Edmond Wodehouse; Wyndham Murray	Member of Parliament for Bath; 1906 – January 1910; With: George Peabody Gooch	Succeeded by Lord Alexander Thynne; Charles Hunter
Preceded by William Younger	Member of Parliament for Peebles and Selkirk; December 1910 – 1918	Constituency renamed Peebles and Southern Midlothian
New constituency	Member of Parliament for Peebles and Southern Midlothian; 1918–1922	Succeeded by Joseph Westwood
Preceded by Alfred Martyn Williams	Member of Parliament for North Cornwall; 1929–1932	Succeeded by Francis Dyke Acland
Political offices
Preceded by H. H. Asquith	Leader of the Opposition; 1918–1920	Succeeded by H. H. Asquith
Preceded by Hastings Lees-Smith	President of the Board of Education; 1931–1932	Succeeded by The Lord Irwin
Party political offices
Preceded by H. H. Asquith	Leader of the Liberal Party in the House of Commons; 1918–1920	Succeeded by H. H. Asquith
Vacant Last known title holder: unknown	Deputy Leader of the Liberal Party in the House of Commons; 1920–1922	Succeeded by John Simon
Preceded by H. H. Asquith	Chairman of the Scottish Liberal Federation c.1924–1928	Succeeded by John Anthony
Preceded by John Mackinnon Robertson	President of the National Liberal Federation; 1923–1926	Succeeded by John Alfred Spender
