= Midlothian (UK Parliament constituency) =

Parliamentary constituency in the United Kingdom, 1955 onwards

Coordinates: 55°49′18″N 3°06′28″W

- County constituency for the House of Commons
- Boundaries since 2005
- Location of Midlothian within Scotland
- Subdivision: Midlothian
- Electorate: 71,210 (March 2020)
- Major settlements: Dalkeith, Gorebridge, Newtongrange, Penicuik, Bonnyrigg

Current constituency
- Created: 1955
- Member of Parliament: Kirsty McNeill (Labour)
- Created from: Midlothian and Peeblesshire

Midlothian in Scotland is a county constituency of the House of Commons of the Parliament of the United Kingdom. It elects one Member of Parliament (MP) by the first-past-the-post voting system. The seat has been represented since 2024 by Kirsty McNeill of Scottish Labour.

It replaced Midlothian and Peeblesshire at the 1955 general election. A similar constituency, also called Midlothian, was used by the Scottish Parliament until 2011.

== Boundaries ==
1955–1974: The county of Midlothian, including all the burghs situated therein, except the county of the city of Edinburgh and the burgh of Musselburgh.

1974–1983: As above.

1983–1997: Midlothian District.

1997–2005: The Midlothian District electoral wards of Bonnyrigg/Newtongrange, Dalkeith, Loanhead, and Mayfield/Gorebridge.

2005–present: The area of the Midlothian Council.

When first formed, the constituency covered the whole of the traditional county of Midlothian, apart from Edinburgh, split into multiple separate constituencies, and Musselburgh, which was included in Edinburgh East (UK Parliament constituency).

In the 1983 reforms the constituency was significantly reduced from over 100,000 voters to 61,143, with large numbers of voters moved to the new seat of Livingston, and smaller numbers to Edinburgh Pentlands, East Lothian and Tweeddale, Ettrick and Lauderdale.

The 1997 reforms moved Penicuik into Tweeddale, Ettrick and Lauderdale, with the rest of the council area remaining in the seat; it returned in 2005, when the constituency was expanded again to cover the entire Midlothian Council area.

Under the 2023 review of Westminster constituencies, which came into effect for the 2024 general election, the boundaries were unchanged.

== Members of Parliament ==
Elected	Member	Party
1955	David Pryde	Labour
1959	James Hill	Labour
1966	Alex Eadie	Labour
1992	Eric Clarke	Labour
2001	David Hamilton	Labour
2015	Owen Thompson	SNP
2017	Danielle Rowley	Labour
2019	Owen Thompson	SNP
2024	Kirsty McNeill	Labour

== Election results ==
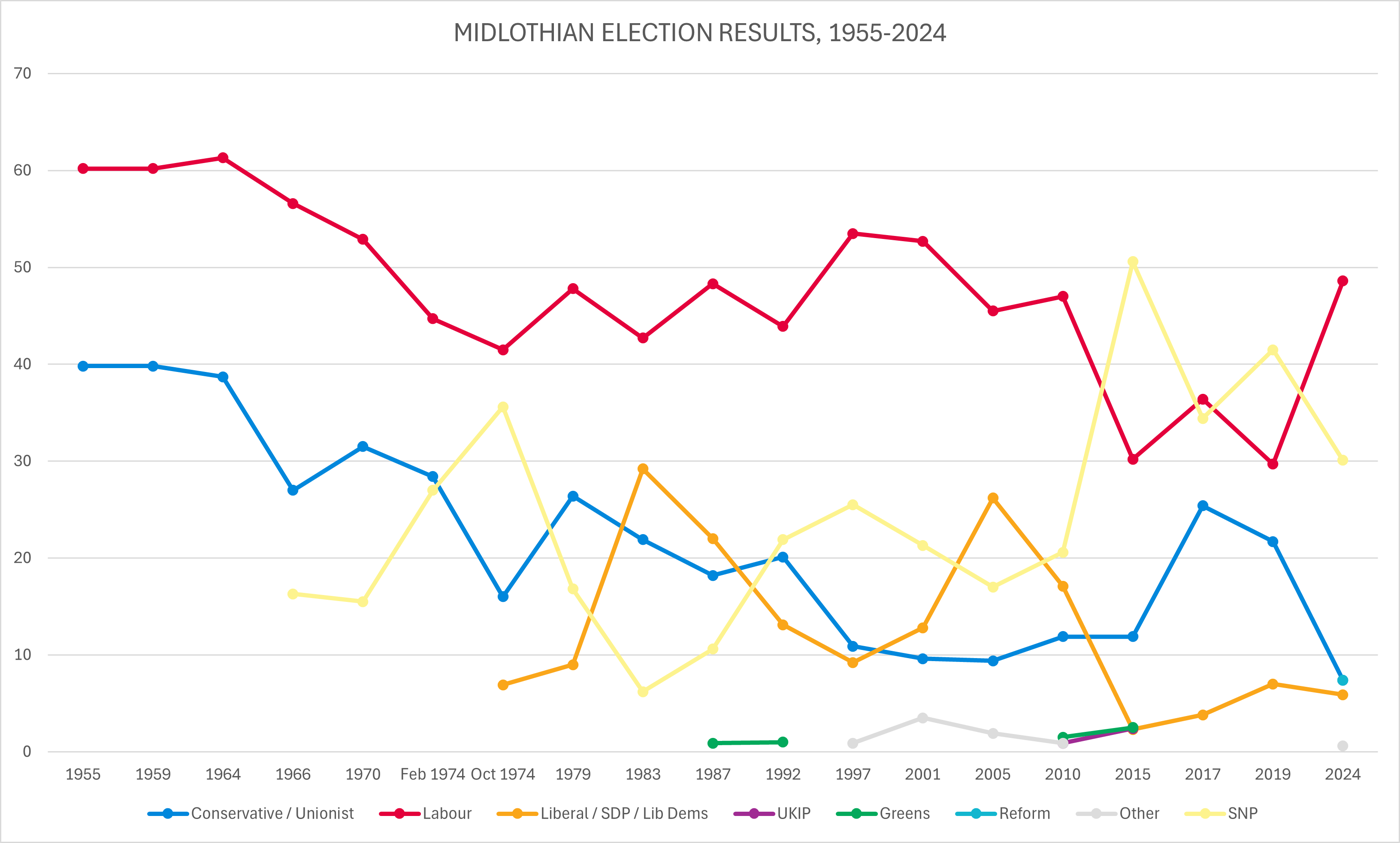
Election results 1955-2024

=== Elections in the 2020s ===
General election 2024: Midlothian
Party	Candidate	Votes	%	±%
Labour Co-op	Kirsty McNeill	21,480	48.6	+18.9
SNP	Owen Thompson	13,313	30.1	−11.4
Reform	Stefan Garbowski	3,276	7.4	New
Conservative	Keith Cockburn	3,248	7.4	−14.3
Liberal Democrats	Ross Laird	2,589	5.9	−1.1
Scottish Libertarian	Daniel Fraser	259	0.6	New
Majority		8,167	18.5	N/A
Turnout		44,165	59.8	−7.9
Registered electors		73,916		
Labour Co-op gain from SNP		Swing	+15.2	

=== Elections in the 2010s ===
General election 2019: Midlothian
Party	Candidate	Votes	%	±%
SNP	Owen Thompson	20,033	41.5	+7.1
Labour	Danielle Rowley	14,328	29.7	−6.7
Conservative	Rebecca Fraser	10,467	21.7	−3.7
Liberal Democrats	Steve Arrundale	3,393	7.0	+3.2
Majority		5,705	11.8	N/A
Turnout		48,221	68.4	+2.1
SNP gain from Labour		Swing	+6.9	

General election 2017: Midlothian
Party	Candidate	Votes	%	±%
Labour	Danielle Rowley	16,458	36.4	+6.2
SNP	Owen Thompson	15,573	34.4	−16.2
Conservative	Chris Donnelly	11,521	25.4	+13.5
Liberal Democrats	Ross Laird	1,721	3.8	+1.5
Majority		885	2.0	N/A
Turnout		45,273	66.3	−4.9
Labour gain from SNP		Swing	+11.2	

General election 2015: Midlothian
Party	Candidate	Votes	%	±%
SNP	Owen Thompson	24,453	50.6	+30.0
Labour	Kenny Young	14,594	30.2	−16.8
Conservative	Michelle Ballantyne	5,760	11.9	±0.0
Green	Ian Baxter	1,219	2.5	+1.0
UKIP	Gordon Norrie	1,173	2.4	+1.5
Liberal Democrats	Aisha Mir	1,132	2.3	−14.8
Majority		9,859	20.4	N/A
Turnout		48,331	71.2	+7.3
SNP gain from Labour		Swing	+23.4	

General election 2010: Midlothian
Party	Candidate	Votes	%	±%
Labour	David Hamilton	18,449	47.0	+1.5
SNP	Colin Beattie	8,100	20.6	+3.6
Liberal Democrats	Ross Laird	6,711	17.1	−9.1
Conservative	James E. Callander	4,661	11.9	+2.5
Green	Ian G. Baxter	595	1.5	New
UKIP	Gordon Norrie	364	0.9	New
Independent	George McCleery	196	0.5	New
TUSC	Willie C. Duncan	166	0.4	New
Majority		10,349	26.4	+7.1
Turnout		39,242	63.9	+1.7
Labour hold		Swing	−1.1	

=== Elections in the 2000s ===
General election 2005: Midlothian
Party	Candidate	Votes	%	±%
Labour	David Hamilton	17,153	45.5	−5.0
Liberal Democrats	Fred Mackintosh	9,888	26.2	+8.9
SNP	Colin Beattie	6,400	17.0	−2.2
Conservative	Iain McGill	3,537	9.4	+0.2
Scottish Socialist	Norman V. Gilfillan	726	1.9	−1.2
Majority		7,265	19.3	−11.9
Turnout		37,704	62.2	+1.0
Labour hold		Swing	−7.0	

General election 2001: Midlothian
Party	Candidate	Votes	%	±%
Labour	David Hamilton	15,145	52.7	−0.8
SNP	Ian Goldie	6,131	21.3	−4.2
Liberal Democrats	Jacqueline Bell	3,686	12.8	+3.6
Conservative	Robin Traquair	2,748	9.6	−1.3
Scottish Socialist	Robert Goupillot	837	2.9	New
ProLife Alliance	Terence Holden	177	0.6	New
Majority		9,014	31.4	+3.4
Turnout		28,724	59.1	−15.0
Labour hold		Swing		

=== Elections in the 1990s ===
General election 1997: Midlothian
Party	Candidate	Votes	%	±%
Labour	Eric Clarke	18,861	53.5	+9.6
SNP	Lawrence Millar	8,991	25.5	+3.6
Conservative	Anne C. Harper	3,842	10.9	−9.2
Liberal Democrats	Richard F. Pinnock	3,235	9.2	−3.9
Referendum	Keith K. Docking	320	0.9	New
Majority		9,870	28.0	+6.0
Turnout		35,249	74.1	−3.8
Labour hold		Swing		

General election 1992: Midlothian
Party	Candidate	Votes	%	±%
Labour	Eric Clarke	20,588	43.9	−4.4
SNP	Andrew Lumsden	10,254	21.9	+11.3
Conservative	Jeff Stoddart	9,443	20.1	+1.9
Liberal Democrats	Paul L. Sewell	6,164	13.1	−8.9
Green	Iain D. Morrice	476	1.0	+0.1
Majority		10,334	22.0	−4.3
Turnout		46,925	77.9	+1.0
Labour hold		Swing		

=== Elections in the 1980s ===
General election 1987: Midlothian
Party	Candidate	Votes	%	±%
Labour	Alex Eadie	22,553	48.3	+5.6
SDP	Alan Dewar	10,330	22.0	−7.2
Conservative	Frank Riddell	8,527	18.2	−3.7
SNP	Ian Chisholm	4,947	10.6	+4.4
Green	Ian Smith	412	0.9	New
Majority		12,223	26.3	+12.8
Turnout		45,291	76.9	+1.9
Labour hold		Swing		

General election 1983: Midlothian
Party	Candidate	Votes	%	±%
Labour	Alex Eadie	19,401	42.7	−9.7
SDP	Alan Dewar	13,245	29.2	+21.1
Conservative	Duncan Menzies	9,922	21.9	−3.6
SNP	Marjory Hird	2,826	6.2	−5.5
Majority		6,156	13.5	−7.9
Turnout		45,394	75.0	−3.8
Labour hold		Swing		

=== Elections in the 1970s ===
General election 1979: Midlothian
Party	Candidate	Votes	%	±%
Labour	Alex Eadie	37,773	47.8	+6.3
Conservative	Hugh Wallace Mann	20,797	26.4	+10.4
SNP	Glen Anthony Frederick Spiers	13,260	16.8	−18.8
Liberal	Alexander Paton Brodie	7,129	9.0	+2.1
Majority		16,936	21.4	+15.5
Turnout		78,959	77.8	+0.4
Labour hold		Swing		

General election October 1974: Midlothian
Party	Candidate	Votes	%	±%
Labour	Alex Eadie	28,652	41.5	−3.2
SNP	John Gerard McKinlay	24,568	35.6	+8.6
Conservative	Alistair Ballantyne	11,046	16.0	−12.4
Liberal	Philip Wheeler	4,793	6.9	New
Majority		4,084	5.9	−10.4
Turnout		69,059	77.4	−4.2
Labour hold		Swing		

General election February 1974: Midlothian
Party	Candidate	Votes	%	±%
Labour	Alex Eadie	32,220	44.7	−8.2
Conservative	David Louis Mowat	20,478	28.4	−3.1
SNP	John Gerard McKinlay	19,450	27.0	+11.5
Majority		11,742	16.3	−5.1
Turnout		72,148	81.6	+6.0
Labour hold		Swing	−2.6	

General election 1970: Midlothian
Party	Candidate	Votes	%	±%
Labour	Alex Eadie	30,802	52.9	−3.7
Conservative	John L.G. Lamotte	18,328	31.5	+4.5
SNP	George Park	9,047	15.5	−0.8
Majority		12,474	21.4	−8.2
Turnout		58,177	75.6	−1.9
Labour hold		Swing	−4.1	

=== Elections in the 1960s ===
General election 1966: Midlothian
Party	Candidate	Votes	%	±%
Labour	Alex Eadie	27,608	56.6	−4.7
Conservative	John L.G. Lamotte	13,192	27.0	−11.7
SNP	Steven Rae	7,974	16.3	New
Majority		14,416	29.6	+7.2
Turnout		48,774	77.5	−1.4
Labour hold		Swing	+3.5	

General election 1964: Midlothian
Party	Candidate	Votes	%	±%
Labour	James Hill	29,820	61.3	+1.1
Unionist	Daniel A.P. Buchanan	18,861	38.7	−1.1
Majority		10,959	22.4	+2.0
Turnout		48,681	78.9	−2.4
Labour hold		Swing	+1.1	

=== Elections in the 1950s ===
General election 1959: Midlothian
Party	Candidate	Votes	%	±%
Labour	James Hill	28,457	60.2	±0.0
Unionist	William S. How	18,797	39.8	±0.0
Majority		9,660	20.4	±0.0
Turnout		47,254	81.3	+3.2
Labour hold		Swing	±0.0	

General election 1955: Midlothian
Party	Candidate	Votes	%
Labour	David Pryde	25,994	60.2
Unionist	Anthony Stodart	12,208	39.8
Majority		13,786	20.4
Turnout		38,202	78.1
Labour win (new seat)			
