= 1939 North Cornwall by-election =

UK parliamentary by-election

The 1939 North Cornwall by-election was a parliamentary by-election held on 13 July 1939 for the House of Commons constituency of North Cornwall.

== Previous MP ==
The seat had become vacant when the constituency's Liberal Member of Parliament, Francis Dyke Acland died. Acland was first elected for this seat in the 1932 North Cornwall by-election and retained it until his death.

== Previous Result ==
1935 general election: North Cornwall
Party	Candidate	Votes	%	±%
Liberal	Francis Dyke Acland	16,872	51.3	−1.1
Conservative	Edward Robin Whitehouse	16,036	48.7	+1.1
Majority		836	2.6	−2.2
Turnout		32,908	79.9	−0.9
Registered electors		41,164		
Liberal hold		Swing	+1.1 (L to C)	

- Note on 1935 result: Change and swing are calculated from the result of the by-election on 22 July 1932.

== Candidates ==
The Liberal Party candidate was Tom Horabin (1896 – 26 April 1956). He was a business consultant with no local ties and no track record as an election candidate. He was a close friend of John Foot, the influential Liberal candidate for neighbouring Bodmin. The Conservative candidate was E.R. Whitehouse. He had previously contested the seat at the 1935 United Kingdom general election. The local Labour party had already selected D.C.N. Wakley to contest the forthcoming General Election. However, Labour Party Headquarters successfully put pressure on the local Labour party to withdraw their candidate. The action of the Labour HQ was a clear indication of a desire to electorally co-operate with the Liberal party at a forthcoming General Election, along the lines of a Popular Front.

== Result ==
The by-election took place shortly before the start of the Second World War.

13 July 1939 by-election: North Cornwall
Party	Candidate	Votes	%	±%
Liberal	Tom Horabin	17,072	52.2	+0.9
Conservative	Edward Robin Whitehouse	15,608	47.8	−0.9
Majority		1,464	4.4	+1.8
Turnout		32,680	79.3	−0.6
Registered electors		41,191		
Liberal hold		Swing	-0.9 (L to C)	

It was the last peacetime by-election won by the Liberal Party until the 1958 Torrington by-election.

== Aftermath ==
General election July 1945: North Cornwall
Party	Candidate	Votes	%	±%
Liberal	Tom Horabin	18,836	52.9	+0.7
Conservative	T.P. Fulford	16,171	45.4	−2.4
Independent Labour	J.H. Worrall	626	1.7	New
Majority		2,665	7.5	+3.1
Turnout		35,633		
Liberal hold		Swing		

Tom Horabin was the Liberal Party Chief Whip from August 1945 until he resigned and left the party in October 1946. He continued to represent North Cornwall until the 1950 general election, first as an Independent and then as a Labour MP from November 1947. In 1950 Horabin contested Exeter, but did not return to the House of Commons.

== See also ==
- 1932 North Cornwall by-election
- North Cornwall constituency
- List of United Kingdom by-elections (1931–1950)
- United Kingdom by-election records
