= Sue Tinson =

British business executive and former television executive

Dame Susan Myfanwy Tinson, DBE, FRTS (née Thomas; born 15 January 1943), best known as Sue Tinson, is a British business executive and former television executive at ITN.

== Personal life ==
Born in Sussex to John and Kathleen (née Ayling) Thomas, she attended South Hampstead High School and Hull University, where she earned her B.A. She married Trevor James Tinson in 1968; the marriage was dissolved in 1979.

== Career ==
Sue Tinson is currently advisory board director, Pagefield Communications Ltd as well as being a consultant with ITN. She was formerly a non-executive director of Chime Communications plc, ITV London, the Yorkshire Building Society, and St. Ives plc. She was a non-executive Director of both ASDA and Freeserve before they were taken over.

Tinson has more than 40 years' experience in the media industry, much of it with ITN (Independent TV News) as associate editor and editor of ITN and editor of "News at Ten". She is a Fellow of the Royal Television Society. She is a former Commissioner of the Commonwealth War Graves Commission (1999-2004) and a committee member of the Heritage Lottery Fund. She was producer of The Queen's Christmas Broadcasts in 1997, 1998, 2001 and 2002. In 2012 she was a member of the committee for the Queen's Jubilee River Pageant.
