= Archibald Crawford, 1st Baron Hungarton =

Archibald Crawford, 1st Baron Hungarton (12 September 1890 – 14 June 1966), was a British businessman.

Crawford was the son of Robert Crawford, of Highfields Farm, Lowesby, Leicestershire, and was educated at the Wyggeston Grammar School for Boys in Leicester. He later became managing director of Crawford, Prince and Johnston Ltd, agricultural equipment manufacturers, of Lyston, Leicestershire.

In 1951, he was raised to the peerage as Baron Hungarton, of Hungarton in the County of Leicester, in recognition of his "political and public services in Leicestershire".

General election 1922: Peebles and Southern Midlothian
| Party | Candidate | Votes | % | ±% |
|---|---|---|---|---|
| Labour | Joseph Westwood | 6,394 | 36.0 | −3.4 |
| Unionist | Archibald Crawford | 5,992 | 33.7 | n/a |
| Liberal | Donald Maclean | 5,337 | 30.3 | −30.3 |
| Majority | | 402 | 2.3 | 23.5 |
| Turnout | | | 75.7 | +23.1 |
| Labour gain from Liberal | | Swing | n/a | |

Lord Hungarton married Jean Johnstone, daughter of David Johnstone, of Castle Douglas, Kirkcudbrightshire, in 1914. They had one son, Squadron-Leader David Robert Crawford, who was killed in action over Germany in February 1945, and a daughter, the Honourable Grace Crawford. Hungarton died in June 1966, aged 75, when the title became extinct.

== Arms ==
Coat of arms of Archibald Crawford, 1st Baron Hungarton
| Crest In front of a garb Or a horseshoe Gules. Escutcheon Per chevron Azure and Argent two cocks combatant Argent crested wattled and membered Gules in base a fox’s mask Proper. Supporters On either side a bull Sable armed and unguled Or gorged with a collar Vair the dexter charged on the shoulder with a plate thereon a thistle slipped and leaved Proper the sinister charged on the shoulder with a rose Argent barbed and seeded also Proper. Motto Solum Patriae |

Peerage of the United Kingdom
| New creation | Baron Hungarton; 1951–1966 | Extinct |
