= Journal of Obstetrics and Gynaecology =

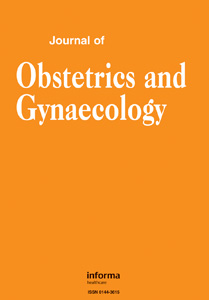
- Discipline: Obstetrics, Gynaecology
- Language: English
- Edited by: Allan Bruce MacLean

Publication details
- History: 1980–present
- Publisher: Informa Healthcare (United Kingdom)
- Frequency: 8/year
- Open access: no

Standard abbreviations
- ISO 4: J. Obstet. Gynaecol.

Indexing
- ISSN: 0144-3615 (print); 1364-6893 (web)

Links
- Journal homepage

The Journal of Obstetrics and Gynaecology is an international peer-reviewed medical journal that publishes original research and review articles on the entire field of obstetrics and gynecology, with an emphasis on practical applicability. The journal publishes a wide range of papers, including scientific and clinical research, reviews, case reports, and supplements on clinical symposia.

== Editor ==
Allan Bruce MacLean, is the Editor of Journal of Obstetrics and Gynaecology. MacLean is a professor of Obstetrics and Gynaecology at the University College London Medical School.
