= Alfred Martyn Williams =

British naval officer and MP

Commander Alfred Martyn Williams CBE DSC DL

Member of Parliament for North Cornwall
- In office 1924–1929

Personal details
- Born: 14 May 1897
- Died: 1 March 1985 (aged 87)

Alfred Martyn Williams (14 May 1897 – 1 March 1985) was a British naval officer and Conservative MP for North Cornwall.

He won the seat from the Liberals in 1924, but lost it to them in 1929. He unsuccessfully tried to win it back from them at the 1931 general election and a by-election in 1932.

He was also High Sheriff of Cornwall in 1938. He was the father of Hugh Martyn Williams.

== Sources ==
British Parliamentary Election Results 1918–1949, compiled and edited by F.W.S. Craig (Macmillan Press 1977)

Who's Who of British Members of Parliament, Volume III 1919–1945, edited by M. Stenton and S. Lees (Harvester Press 1979)

Who Was Who

- v
- t
- e
