= Heathcoat-Amory =

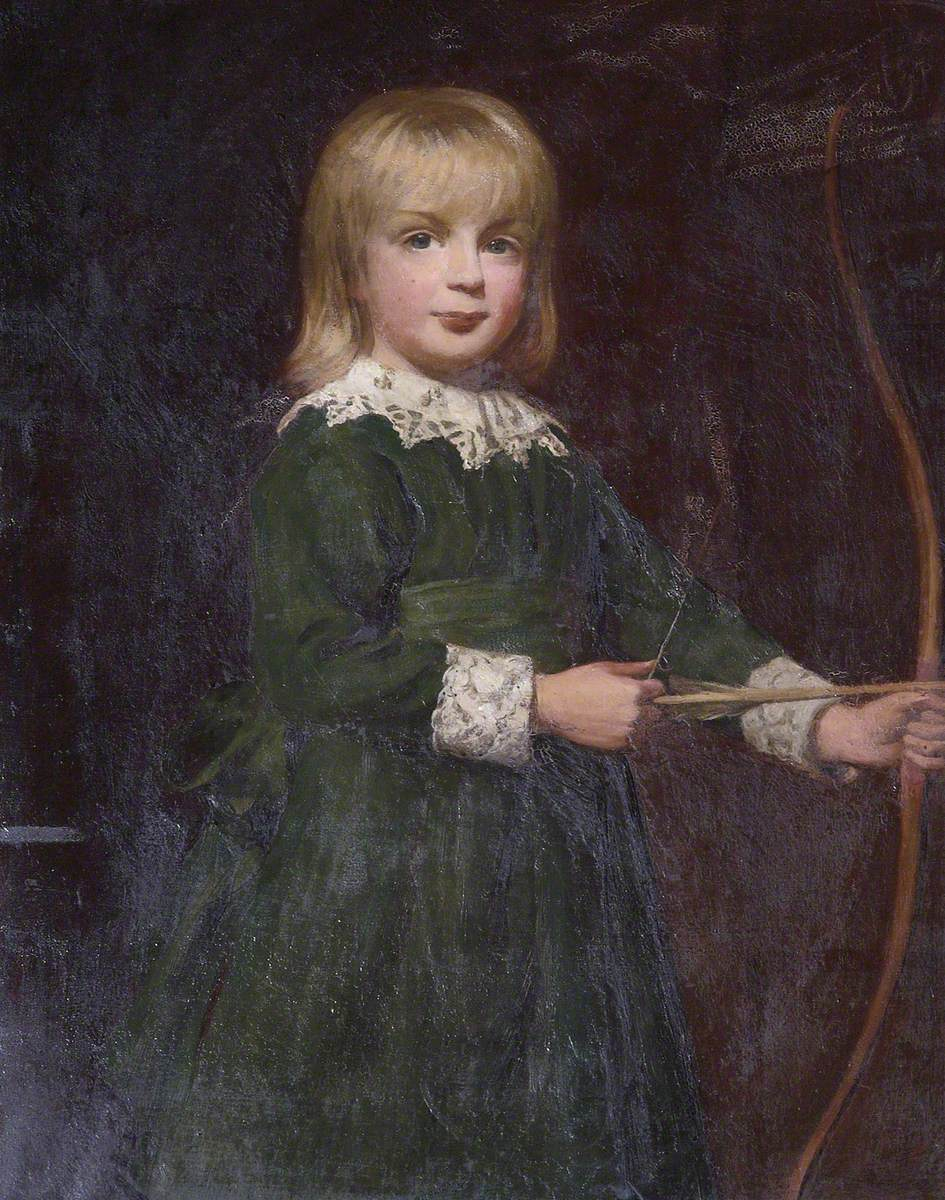
Ludovic Heathcoat-Amory as a child

Heathcoat-Amory is a double-barrelled English surname. Notable people with this surname include the following:

- David Heathcoat-Amory (born 1949), English politician
- Derick Heathcoat-Amory, 1st Viscount Amory (1899–1981), English politician
- Sir John Heathcoat-Amory, 1st Baronet (1824–1914), English politician
- Sir John Heathcoat-Amory, 3rd Baronet (1894–1972), English cricketer
- Joyce Wethered, Lady Heathcoat-Amory (1901–1997), English golf champion
- Ludovic Heathcoat-Amory, English first-class cricketer

== See also ==
- Amory (name)
- Heathcoat-Amory baronets
