= Amory (name) =

Amory is both an English given name – derived from the Old German name Amalric via the French form Amaury – and a surname derived from it.

== Given name ==
- Slats Gill, real name Amory Gill (1901–1966), American sports coach
- Amory Hansen (1887–1961), Danish tennis player
- Amory Nelson Hardy (1835–1911), American photographer
- Amory Holbrook (1820–1856), American lawyer and politician
- Amory Houghton (1899–1981), American diplomat
- Amo Houghton (1926–2020), American diplomat; son of Amory Houghton
- Amory Lovins (born 1947), American physicist
- Amory Kane, otherwise Jack Kane (born 1946), American musician
- Amory Dwight Mayo (1823–1907), American Unitarian clergyman

== Surname ==
- Alan Amory, South African academic
- Anthony Amory (born 1963), Bermudan cricketer
- Cleveland Amory (1917–1998), American author
- Estelle Mendell Amory (1845–?), American author, educator
- Katharine Greene Amory (1731–1777), Boston diarist
- Patrick Amory (born 1965), American recorded music historian
- Peter Amory (born 1962), English actor
- Samuel Amory (1784–1857), English lawyer
- Thomas Amory (disambiguation)
- Vance Amory (1949–2022), Prime Minister of Nevis

== See also ==
- Amery (name)
- Amory Blaine, a fictional character
- Amory Lorch, a fictional character from the A Song of Ice and Fire books
- Heathcoat-Amory
- Viscount Amory
