= Harry Stanley =

Harry Stanley may refer to:

- Harry Stanley (cricketer) (1888–1934), English cricketer
- Harry Stanley (magician), proprietor of the Unique Magic Studio in London
- H. Eugene Stanley (born 1941), American physicist
- Killing of Harry Stanley

== See also ==
- Henry Stanley (disambiguation)
- Harold Stanley, American businessman
