= Hollister v National Farmers' Union =

Hollister v National Farmers’ Union
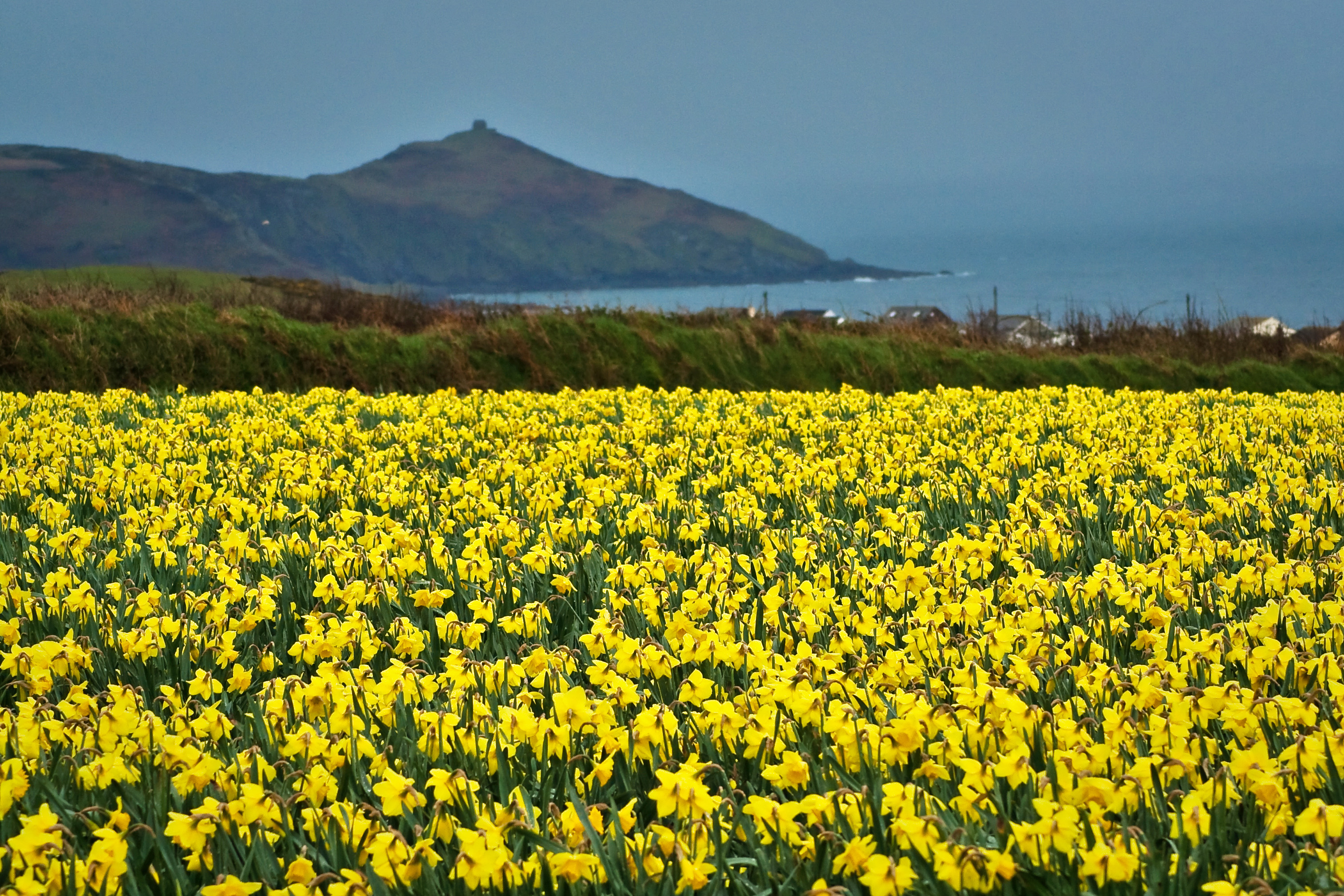
- Court: Court of Appeal of England and Wales
- Decided: 9 March 1979
- Citation: [1979] ICR 542

Case opinions
- Lord Denning MR

Keywords
- Dismissal, redundancy

Hollister v National Farmers’ Union [1979] ICR 542 is a UK labour law case concerning redundancy and unfair dismissal.

== Facts ==
Mr Hollister worked in Cornwall for the National Farmers’ Union as a secretary, earning commission on getting insurance with Cornish Mutual Association Co for members. The secretaries complained their pay was lower than in the rest of the country, so head office negotiated new terms, but without consulting the Cornwall secretaries. Mr Hollister said the new terms were insufficient, and he refused to accept. He thought though there was a slight increase in pay, the pension entitlements were not as good. He was dismissed, and so claimed it was unfair.

The Tribunal found the dismissal was for some other substantial reason and there was no duty to consult. The EAT held that the dismissal was for a substantial reason, but the level of consultation was not enough to discharge the onus that their action was reasonable.

== Judgment ==
The Court of Appeal held the dismissal was a “substantial reason of a kind such as to justify the dismissal” within EPA 1974 Sch 1, para 6(1)(b). There was no requirement to consult the claimant specifically. Consultation was one factor among many that could be taken into account. Lord Denning MR held that a business reorganisation like this could be ‘some other substantial reason’.

The question which is being discussed in this case is whether the reorganisation of the business which the National Farmers' Union felt they had to undertake in 1976, coupled with Mr. Hollister's refusal to accept the new agreement, was a substantial reason of such a kind as to justify the dismissal of the employee. Upon that there have only been one or two cases. One we were particularly referred to was Ellis v Brighton Co-operative Society Ltd where it was recognised by the court that reorganisation of business may on occasion be a sufficient reason justifying the dismissal of an employee. They went on to say, at p. 420:

“Where there has been a properly consulted-upon reorganisation which, if it is not done, is going to bring the whole business to a standstill, a failure to go along with the new arrangements may *551 well — it is not bound to, but it may well — constitute ‘some other substantial reason.’”

Certainly, I think, everyone would agree with that. But in the present case Arnold J. expanded it a little so as not to limit it to where it came absolutely to a standstill but to where there was some sound, good business reason for the reorganisation. I must say I see no reason to differ from Arnold J.'s view on that. It must depend on all the circumstances whether the reorganisation was such that the only sensible thing to do was to terminate the employee's contract unless he would agree to a new arrangement. It seems to me that that paragraph may well be satisfied, and indeed was satisfied in this case, having regard to the commercial necessity of rearrangements being made and the termination of the relationship with the Cornish Mutual, and the setting up of a new relationship via the National Farmers' Union Mutual Insurance Society Ltd. On that rearrangement being made, it was absolutely essential for new contracts to be made with the existing group secretaries: and the only way to deal with it was to terminate the agreements and offer them reasonable new ones. It seems to me that that would be, and was, a substantial reason of a kind sufficient to justify this kind of dismissal. I stress the word “kind.”

Eveleigh LJ concurred.

Sir Stanley Rees concurred.

== See also ==
- UK labour law
- Unfair dismissal
