= Alison Rose (banker) =

British banker

Dame Alison Rose DBE
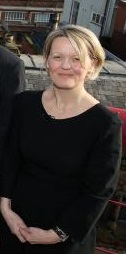
- Rose in 2016
- Born: Alison Marie Rose; November 1969 (age 56)
- Education: St Aidan's College, Durham, Durham University
- Occupation: Banker
- Title: Former CEO, NatWest Group
- Term: 2019–2023
- Predecessor: Ross McEwan
- Successor: Paul Thwaite
- Spouse: David Slade
- Children: 2

Dame Alison Marie Rose-Slade DBE (née Rose; born November 1969) is a British banker. She was chief executive of NatWest Group from November 2019 to July 2023 and the first woman to lead a major lender in the UK. She was appointed a Dame Commander of the Order of the British Empire in the 2023 New Year Honours.

== Early life ==
Rose was born in 1969. She grew up overseas in a military family, settling back in the UK when she was 15. She graduated with a bachelor's degree in history from Durham University in 1991.

== Career ==
Rose started her career as a graduate trainee with NatWest in 1992.

She was appointed a member of RBS's executive committee on 27 February 2014. In October 2014, as head of commercial and private banking at RBS, she announced a new plan for the bank to bring more women into decision-level and board-level positions. In August 2015, she encouraged her managers to reconnect with the SMBs part of their clientele.

In April 2018, Rose was appointed to the board of Great Portland Estates as a non-executive director. She stepped down in July 2023.

In September 2018, she was nominated to lead the HM Treasury's review focusing on barriers for women in business. In November 2018, she became deputy chief executive of NatWest Holdings.

In September 2018, the UK Government commissioned Rose to lead an independent review of female entrepreneurship. In March 2019, the 'Rose Review of Female Entrepreneurship' found that only one in three UK entrepreneurs is female and less than one per cent of UK venture funding goes to all-female teams.

In April 2019, Rose was "widely-tipped" to succeed Ross McEwan as CEO.

Rose was the chief executive of commercial and private banking at Royal Bank of Scotland Group and deputy chief executive of NatWest Holdings. In September 2019, it was announced that she would succeed Ross McEwan as CEO of RBS Group on 1 November 2019, making her the "first woman to lead major UK lender". RBS Group was re-named NatWest Group in 2020.

In October 2021, Rose was awarded an honorary degree from Durham University.

On 26 July 2023, Rose resigned as chief executive of NatWest Group with immediate effect following the bank's decision to close Nigel Farage's bank account at Coutts. It was alleged that Rose had ultimate responsibility for the closure of Farage's accounts, but an independent investigation by law firm Travers Smith found she 'played no part' in the decision by the bank. However, Rose resigned admitting a "serious error of judgement" following a discussion of Farage's confidential banking details with Simon Jack, the Business Editor of BBC News, on the evening before the BBC published an article saying Farage's bank accounts were closed "for commercial reasons" on 4 July. She received £2.4 million as a fixed pay package in line with the bank's good leaver rules but did not receive share awards and bonuses of £7.6 million.

In October 2023, Information Commissioner's Office initially ruled that Rose had breached data protection laws when discussing the closure with the BBC, but in November 2023 withdrew its comments stating that the ruling related only to NatWest and issued an apology to Rose. In the same month, NatWest stated that “No finding of misconduct has been made against Ms Rose by NatWest Group,” following the completion of a review commissioned by NatWest from law firm Travers Smith.

Rose was appointed Dame Commander of the Order of the British Empire (DBE) in the 2023 New Year Honours for services to the financial sector, and later that month she was given an honorary degree by the new Chancellor of York University Dr Heather Melville.

In February 2023, Rose was appointed chair of the Government’s Energy Efficiency Taskforce. She stepped down in July 2023. In July, she was appointed to the Government’s Business Council by Prime Minister Rishi Sunak.

She is the former chair of the McLaren/Deloitte advisory council and the vice chair of Business in the Community.

In July 2024, Rose was appointed as senior advisor to Charterhouse Capital Partners.

In September 2024, Rose became a diversity and inclusion adviser to the law firm Mishcon de Reya.

== Personal life ==
Rose is married to UBS banker David Slade, and they have two children, a daughter and a son. They live in Highgate, London.
