= John Heathcoat-Amory =

John Heathcoat-Amory may refer to:

- Sir John Heathcoat-Amory, 1st Baronet, British businessman and politician
- Sir John Heathcoat-Amory, 3rd Baronet, English cricketer
