= Chevithorne =

Village in Devon, England

Coordinates: 50.92°N 03.46°W

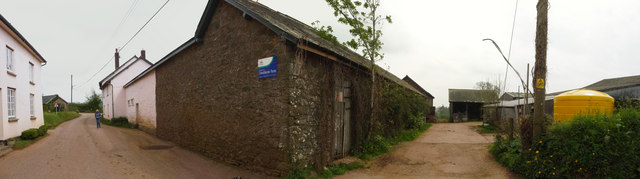

- Location within Devon
- OS grid reference: SS9715
- Civil parish: Tiverton
- District: Mid Devon
- Shire county: Devon
- Region: South West
- Country: England
- Sovereign state: United Kingdom
- Post town: Tiverton
- Postcode district: EX16
- Police: Devon and Cornwall
- Fire: Devon and Somerset
- Ambulance: South Western
- UK Parliament: Tiverton and Minehead

Chevithorne (grid reference SS9715) is a small village near Tiverton, Devon. It lies three miles to the North East of Tiverton. 'Chenetorne' is identified in two entries of Domesday Book: The first entry tells us the manor of Chevithorne, had a taxable value 0.6 geld units, and worth £2.3 to the lord in 1086. The holding was populated by 4 villagers. 2 smallholders. 8 slaves. There was enough ploughland for 2 lord's plough teams. and 2 men's plough teams and had, in addition, 0.12 lord's lands. 8 acres of meadow. 15 acres in pasture. and 3 acres of woodland. There were also 10 cattle and 60 sheep. The 'Lords' of this holding in 1086: are named as Alwin (who is also named as lord in 1066), and Beatrix (the sister of Ralph of Pomeroy and William 'the goat'). Ralph de Pomeroy was Tenant-in-chief, He was a large land holder in Devon, and his brother William held several properties as both lord and Tenant-in-Chief.

The balance of the land was held by Baldwin,'the Sheriff', as Tenant in Chief, served by Rogo (son of Nigel) as lord. The holding included 3 villagers. 3 smallholders. 3 slaves; 5 ploughlands. 1 lord's plough teams. 0.5 men's plough teams, in addition to 0.12 acres of lord's lands. 11 acres in meadow, and 12 acres in pasture for 5 cattle. 16 pigs. 18 sheep. 6 goat. Plus 100 acres of woods for hunting. All valued to the lord, in 1086, at £1.

== Major Buildings ==
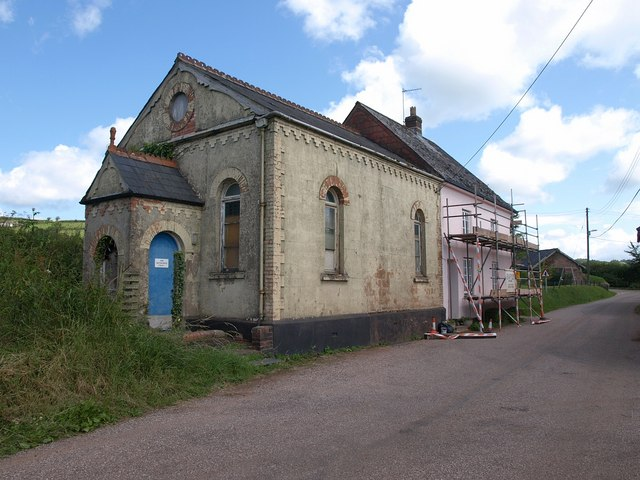
Chevithorne Methodist Chapel -

The Church of St Thomas, the parish church, is a Victorian building of 1843 by Bejamin Ferrey. It is of local red sandstone with a slate roof and in a Middle Pointed style. The interior has memorial tablets to members of the Heathcoat-Amory family, local industrialists and landowners who lived at nearby Knightshayes Court. The churchyard contains a memorial to Michael Heathcoat-Amory by the sculptor Eric Gill. The church is a Grade II listed building.

The vicarage, behind the church, is by the Victorian architect William Burges and was commissioned by Sir John Heathcoat-Amory and constructed 1870-71. The style is Burges's "unmistakable muscular Gothic." The building is of one storey with a garret and a kitchen wing and cost £700. Now a private house, the vicarage is also Grade II listed.

Chevithorne Barton is a manor house of the early 17th century, rebuilt in the 19th century and further remodelled for the Heathcoat-Amory's in 1930. Of three storeys, it contains some original Jacobean plasterwork and panelling. The manor house is a Grade II* listed building. Michael Heathcoat Amory (born October 1941, died February 2016) created the arboretum there, and published a catalogue entitled The Oaks of Chevithorne Barton.
