= Henry Stanley =

Henry Stanley may refer to:

- Henry Stanley, 4th Earl of Derby (1531–1593), Lord High Steward at the trial for treason of Philip Howard, Earl of Arundel
- Henry Stanley, 3rd Baron Stanley of Alderley (1827–1903), historian
- Henry Morton Stanley (1841–1904), journalist and leading figure in the exploration of Africa
- Henry Stanley (cricketer) (1873–1900), English cricketer
- Henry Charles Stanley (1840–1921), chief engineer of the railways in Queensland, Australia
- Henry Stanley (1515–1598), father of Sir Edward Stanley, 1st Baronet
- Henry Smith-Stanley (1803–1875), British MP for Preston

== See also ==
- Harry Stanley (disambiguation)
- Stanley (disambiguation)
