= Mid Devon Show =

Event in England

The Mid Devon Show is an agricultural show held on one day annually in July in Tiverton, Devon, England. It is organised by the Mid Devon Town and Country Show Society and includes farm demonstrations, arts and rural crafts. The show, which has been running since 1993, was originally held at Hartnoll Farm in Tiverton. From 2015 it moved to a new site at Knightshayes Court, Tiverton.

== History ==
The show began in 1993, and is a single day event. The 2014 and the 21st show was the last show to be held at the original site of Hartnoll Farm, Post Hill, Tiverton.

The 2015 and 22nd show was held at a new site at Knightshayes Court, Tiverton. The 2020 show was cancelled in April of that year, due to the COVID-19 pandemic, but the show returned in 2021.

In 2023 organisers suffered a £30,000 loss after wet weather, described as a 'deluge', kept visitors away.

== Organisation ==
The show has one paid employee and around 250 volunteers. It is the flagship event of the Devon County Agricultural Association (DCAA), who announced that Her Royal Highness, The Princess Royal would be patron of the show for 2025. Since 2025 the show has been sponsored by insurance company Cornish Mutual.

The show includes typical agricultural show events such as a livestock show, a flower and garden tent, a food hall, live music, and trade stands. There is also a vintage bus and classic cars parade. Events have included Shetland pony racing, a horse formation team, and ATV stunt show.

The show has supported a number of different charities, including Children’s Hospice South West in 2012, Hospiscare in 2021, and Marie Curie in 2024.
