= Derick Heathcoat-Amory, 1st Viscount Amory =

British Conservative politician (1899–1981)

The Right Honourable The Viscount Amory KG GCMG TD PC DL OD
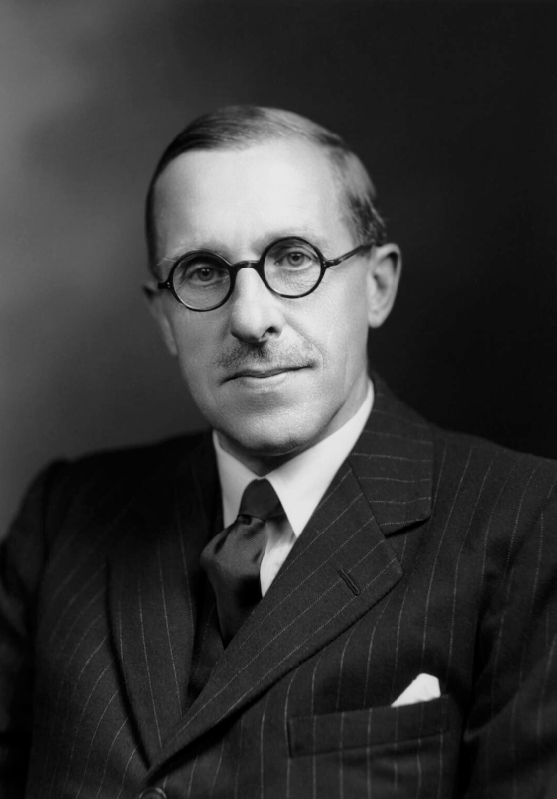
- Heathcoat-Amory in 1948

Chancellor of the Exchequer
- In office 6 January 1958 – 27 July 1960
- Prime Minister: Harold Macmillan
- Preceded by: Peter Thorneycroft
- Succeeded by: Selwyn Lloyd

Minister of Agriculture, Fisheries and Food
- In office 28 July 1954 – 6 January 1958
- Prime Minister: Winston Churchill; Anthony Eden; Harold Macmillan
- Preceded by: Thomas Dugdale
- Succeeded by: John Hare

Minister of State for Trade
- In office 3 September 1953 – 28 July 1954
- Prime Minister: Winston Churchill
- Preceded by: Office Created
- Succeeded by: Derek Walker-Smith

Minister of Pensions
- In office 5 November 1951 – 3 September 1953
- Prime Minister: Winston Churchill
- Preceded by: George Isaacs
- Succeeded by: Osbert Peake

Member of Parliament for Tiverton
- In office 5 July 1945 – 1 September 1960
- Preceded by: Gilbert Acland-Troyte
- Succeeded by: Robin Maxwell-Hyslop

Personal details
- Born: 26 December 1899 London, England
- Died: 20 January 1981 (aged 81) Chevithorne, Devon, England
- Party: Conservative
- Education: Christ Church, Oxford
- Military career
- Allegiance: United Kingdom
- Branch: British Army
- Service years: 1920–1948
- Rank: Lieutenant-Colonel
- Conflicts: Second World War

Derick Heathcoat-Amory, 1st Viscount Amory (/ˈeɪməri/ AY-mər-ee; 26 December 1899 – 20 January 1981) was a British Conservative politician and member of the House of Lords.

He served as Chancellor of the Exchequer between 1958 and 1960, and later as Chancellor of the University of Exeter from 1972 until his death in 1981.

== Background and education ==
Derick Heathcoat-Amory was born in London on 26 December 1899, the son of Sir Ian Heathcoat-Amory, 2nd Baronet (see Heathcoat-Amory baronets) and Alexandra Georgina (OBE; who d. 1942), eldest daughter of Vice-Admiral Henry Seymour CB (brother of Francis, 5th Marquess of Hertford GCB).

He was educated at Ludgrove School followed by Eton College and Christ Church, Oxford, receiving an MA degree.

His great-nephews include the Rt Hon David Heathcoat-Amory and Sir Ian Heathcoat-Amory, 6th and present baronet. A great-aunt was the sculptor Princess Victor of Hohenlohe-Langenburg, Countess von Gleichen.

== Career ==
Heathcoat-Amory was elected a Devon County Councillor in 1932 and worked in textile manufacturing and banking. He was commissioned a second lieutenant in the 11th (Devon) Army Brigade, Royal Field Artillery (Territorial Army) on 31 July 1920, promoted to lieutenant in the regiment (by then the 96th (Royal Devonshire Yeomanry) Field Brigade) on 31 July 1922 and promoted to captain on 1 September 1926. He was promoted to major on 1 October 1935. During the Second World War, he was wounded and captured during Operation Market-Garden. He retired on 1 September 1948 with the honorary rank of lieutenant-colonel.

He was elected Member of Parliament for Tiverton in 1945 (a constituency previously held by his grandfather Sir John Heathcoat-Amory, 1st Baronet). When the Conservatives came to power under Winston Churchill in 1951 he was appointed Minister of Pensions. In September 1953 he was appointed Minister of State for Trade. He joined Churchill's Cabinet in July 1954 succeeding Sir Thomas Dugdale as Minister of Agriculture and Fisheries (continuing his responsibilities as Minister of State for Trade). In October 1954 these ministries merged under Heathcoat-Amory's leadership. The Hon. Gwilym Lloyd George later Viscount Tenby had previously been charged with Food ministerial affairs. He remained in this post until being appointed Chancellor of the Exchequer in 1958, by Harold Macmillan, an office he held until 1960. A highlight of Amory's chancellorship was the raising of the Bank Rate to 6% in June 1960, in an effort to cool the economy after the election the previous autumn.

He stood down from the House of Commons in 1960 and was raised to the peerage as Viscount Amory, of Tiverton in the County of Devon, on 1 September of that year. From 1965 to 1970, he was Governor (Company Chairman) of the Hudson's Bay Company, North America's oldest company (established by English royal charter in 1670). Viscount Amory was sworn of the Privy Council in 1953, and appointed GCMG in 1961 and KG in 1968. He also received the degree of Hon. LLD (Exon) in 1959, before serving as Chancellor of Exeter University from 1972 to 1981.

== Personal life ==
Heathcoat-Amory was an accomplished sailor, who had his yacht brought up the Thames to take him away after making Budget speeches when Chancellor of the Exchequer. The Civil Service Sailing Association continues to award the annual Heathcoat Amory Trophy (donated by Viscount Amory) for outstanding sailing achievements by its members.

In 1972, Lord Amory succeeded his brother in the family baronetcy; he died unmarried at his home in Chevithorne on 20 January 1981, aged 81. The viscountcy became extinct upon his death and his younger brother succeeded him as Sir William Heathcoat-Amory, 5th Baronet, DSO.

== Arms ==
Coat of arms of Derick Heathcoat-Amory, 1st Viscount Amory, KG, GCMG, TD, PC, DL, OD
Coronet A Viscount's Coronet Crest 1st Out of the battlements of a tower Or a talbot's head Azure charged with two annulets fesswise fretted Or (Amory); 2nd on a mount Vert between two roses growing therefrom Gules barbed seeded slipped and leaved proper a pomme charged with a cross Or (Heathcoat). (not displayed at left) Escutcheon Quarterly 1st and 4th Argent two bars Gules on a bend engrailed cottised Sable two annulets Argent (Amory); 2nd and 3rd Vert on each of three piles issuant two in chief and one in base Or a pomme charged with a cross Or (Heathcoat). Supporters Two weaver birds proper membered Or the dexter gorged with a chain pendant therefrom a portcullis Or, the sinister gorged with a chord pendant therefrom a purse also Or. (not displayed at left) Motto AMORE NON VI (not displayed at left)

== National honours ==
- – KG
- – Bt
- – GCMG
- – TD

== See also ==
- Heathcoat-Amory baronets
- Viscount

Parliament of the United Kingdom
Preceded by Gilbert Acland-Troyte	Member of Parliament for Tiverton; 1945–1960	Succeeded by Robin Maxwell-Hyslop
Political offices
Preceded by George Isaacs	Minister of Pensions; 1951–1953	Succeeded by Osbert Peake
New office	Minister of State for Trade; 1953–1957	Succeeded by Derek Walker-Smith
Preceded by Sir Thomas Dugdale, Bt	Minister of Agriculture and Fisheries; 1954	Succeeded by merged as Minister of Agriculture, Fisheries and Food
Preceded by merged as Minister of Agriculture and Fisheries	Minister of Agriculture, Fisheries and Food; 1954–1958	Succeeded by Hon. John Hare
Preceded by Hon. Gwilym Lloyd George as Minister of Food	Minister of Agriculture, Fisheries and Food; 1954–1958	Succeeded by Hon. John Hare
Preceded by Peter Thorneycroft	Chancellor of the Exchequer; 1958–1960	Succeeded by Selwyn Lloyd
Academic offices
Preceded by The Duchess of Devonshire	Chancellor of the University of Exeter; 1972–1981	Succeeded by Sir Rex Richards
Peerage of the United Kingdom
New creation	Viscount Amory; 1960–1981	Extinct
Baronetage of the United Kingdom
Preceded by John Heathcoat-Amory	Baronet (of Knightshayes Court); 1972–1981	Succeeded by William Heathcoat-Amory
