= Ludovic Heathcoat-Amory =

English cricketer and soldier

Personal information
- Full name: Ludovic Heathcoat-Amory
- Born: 11 May 1881; Westminster, London, England
- Died: 28 August 1918 (aged 37); Bayonvillers, Somme, France
- Batting: Right-handed
- Bowling: Right-arm fast
- Relatives: Sir John Heathcoat-Amory (brother); Henry Stanley (uncle)

Domestic team information
- Years: Team
- 1902–1903: Oxford University
- 1902–1910: Devon

Career statistics
| Competition | First-class |
|---|---|
| Matches | 6 |
| Runs scored | 76 |
| Batting average | 6.90 |
| 100s/50s | –/– |
| Top score | 26 |
| Balls bowled | 426 |
| Wickets | 9 |
| Bowling average | 18.33 |
| 5 wickets in innings | – |
| 10 wickets in match | – |
| Best bowling | 4/55 |
| Catches/stumpings | 8/– |
- Source: Cricinfo, 4 May 2020

Ludovic Heathcoat-Amory (11 May 1881 – 25 August 1918) was an English first-class cricketer and soldier.

== Early life ==
Heathcoat-Amory was born at Westminster on 11 May 1881. He was a son of Sir John Heathcoat-Amory, 1st Baronet and the former Henrietta Mary Unwin. His brother John and uncle Henry Stanley both played first-class cricket. He was educated at Eton College, before going up to Christ Church, Oxford.

=== Cricket career ===
While studying at Oxford, he played first-class cricket for Oxford University, making his debut against Surrey at Oxford in 1902. He played first-class cricket for Oxford until 1903, making six appearances. He scored a total of 76 runs in his six matches, with a high score of 26. With his right-arm fast bowling, he took 9 wickets at an average of 18.33 and with best figures of 4 for 55. In addition to playing first-class cricket, Heathcoat-Amory also appeared in three minor counties matches for Devon spread between 1902–10.

== Career ==
After graduating from Oxford in 1904, he time touring South Africa, India, Australia and New Zealand with Edward Wood, the future 1st Earl of Halifax. Heathcoat-Amory served in the First World War with the Royal 1st Devon Yeomanry, which was attached to the Royal Artillery. He was made a temporary a lieutenant in December 1914, while in June 1915 he was made a temporary captain and the following year he was made a temporary major. He was promoted to the full rank of lieutenant in June 1917.

== Personal life ==
In July 1911, he married Mary Stuart Bannatyne, a daughter of James Fitzgerald Bannatyne of Haldon House. Before his death in 1918, they had three children.

- Patrick Gerald Heathcoat-Amory (1912–1942), a barrister who was killed in action, at age 30, in Libya during World War II. He was the pro-Chamberlain Conservative candidate in the 1938 Bridgwater by-election won by the anti-appeasement candidate Vernon Bartlett.
- Michael Ludovic Heathcoat-Amory (1914–1936), who was killed, at age 22, in an airplane accident.
- Edgar Fitzgerald Heathcoat-Amory (1917–1944), who married Sonia Myrtle Denison, daughter of Capt. Edward Conyngham Denison (a grandson of Albert Denison, 1st Baron Londesborough) in 1940; he was killed in action, at age 26, at Normandy, France.

Heathcoat-Amory died of wounds received in action at Bayonvillers in France on 25 August 1918.

=== Descendants ===
Through his youngest son Edgar, he was posthumously a grandfather of Michael FitzGerald Heathcoat Amory (who married Arabella (née von Hofmannsthal) von Westenholz, former wife of Baron Piers von Westenholz), and Amanda Mary Heathcoat-Amory (who married Simon Cairns, 6th Earl Cairns).
