= 1960 Tiverton by-election =

UK parliamentary by-election

The 1960 Tiverton by-election was a parliamentary by-election for the British House of Commons constituency of Tiverton on 16 November 1960.

== Vacancy ==
The by-election was caused by the elevation of the sitting Conservative MP, Rt Hon. Derick Heathcoat-Amory to the House of Lords on 1 September 1960. He had been MP here since holding the seat in 1945.

== Election history ==
Tiverton had been won by the Conservatives at every election since 1924 when they gained the seat from the Liberals. The result at the last General Election was as follows;

1959 general election Electorate 48,416
Party	Candidate	Votes	%	±%
Conservative	Derick Heathcoat-Amory	21,714	55.6	−8.7
Labour	John Dunwoody	9,836	25.2	−10.5
Liberal	James J Collier	7,504	19.2	New
Majority		11,878	30.4	+1.9
Turnout		39,054	80.7	+4.4
Conservative hold		Swing		

== Candidates ==
The Conservatives selected 29-year-old Robin Maxwell-Hyslop. He contested the Derby North constituency at the 1959 general election. He was Personal Assistant to the director and general manager of the aero engine division of Rolls-Royce from 1954 to 1960. Labour selected a new candidate in 35-year-old Raymond Dobson. At the last General election he was Labour candidate for Torrington. The Liberals re-selected 42-year-old James Collier who contested the constituency in 1959. He was a local farmer, his family had farmed in the parish of Culmstock since 1600.

== Result ==
The Conservatives held the seat with a reduced majority.

Tiverton by-election, 1960 Electorate 48,956
Party	Candidate	Votes	%	±%
Conservative	Robin Maxwell-Hyslop	15,308	45.7	−9.9
Liberal	James J Collier	12,268	36.7	+17.5
Labour	Raymond F H Dobson	5,895	17.6	−7.6
Majority		3,040	9.0	−21.4
Turnout		33,471	68.4	−12.3
Conservative hold		Swing		

== Aftermath ==
Maxwell-Hyslop and Collier faced each other again at the following General Election while Dobson moved to contest Bristol North East, where he came second. The result at the 1964 general election;

General election 1964 Electorate 50,854
Party	Candidate	Votes	%	±%
Conservative	Robin Maxwell-Hyslop	19,280	47.3	−8.3
Liberal	James J Collier	14,053	34.5	+15.3
Labour	John T Mitchard	7,393	18.2	−7.6
Majority		5,227	12.8	−17.6
Turnout		40,726	80.1	−0.6
Conservative hold		Swing		

Maxwell-Hyslop retained the seat until he retired at the 1992 general election.

== See also ==
- List of United Kingdom by-elections
- United Kingdom by-election records
