= Nigel Farage Coutts bank scandal =

2023 UK banking controversy

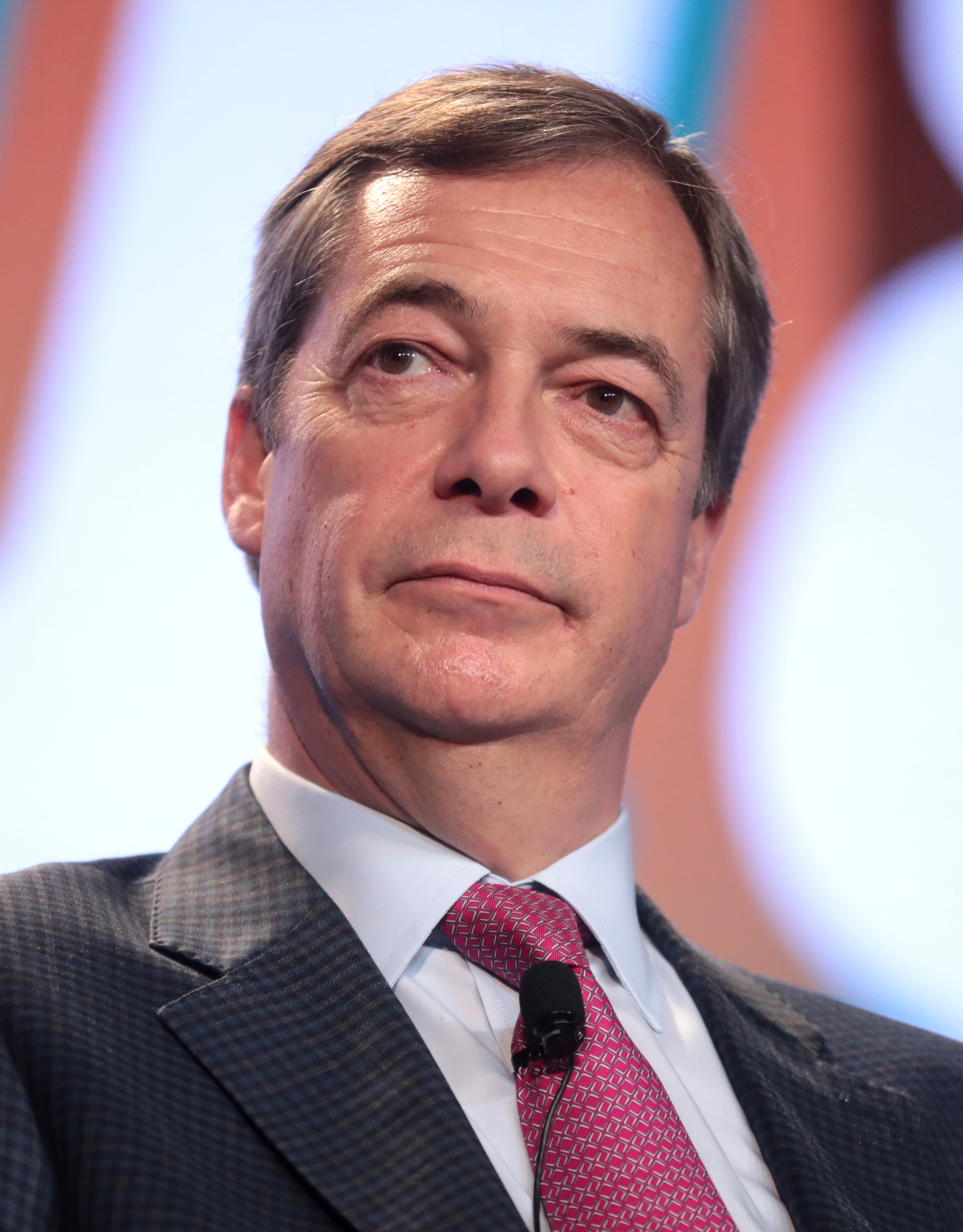
Farage in 2018

In June 2023, the private bank Coutts closed the account held by the British politician and broadcaster Nigel Farage, triggering controversy. NatWest, the owner of Coutts, initially claimed that he failed to meet the Coutts eligibility criteria of holding £1,000,000 or more in his account, following the expiry of his mortgage. NatWest instead offered him an account with the retail side of the bank. It was subsequently revealed it was because of his views that the bank closed his account.

== Events ==
In June 2023, the British politician Nigel Farage said that his account with the private bank Coutts was to be closed. He was offered a standard bank account by Coutts' parent group, NatWest, in the closure notice he received. Farage said he was then refused personal and business accounts at seven other UK banks. When pressed by Farage to reveal why, NatWest said that he failed to meet the Coutts eligibility criteria as he did not hold £1,000,000 or more in his account following the expiry of his mortgage.

The story was picked up by the UK press. It was later revealed that Farage's account was closed in part as Coutts felt that his beliefs and values did not align with theirs. In an internal dossier, Coutts wrote that he "is at best seen as xenophobic and pandering to racists" and considered a "disingenuous grifter".

In a front-page story on 20 July, The Daily Telegraph reported that the Coutts CEO, Dame Alison Rose, had dined with Simon Jack, the business editor for BBC News, on the evening before he published an article saying that the decision had been "for commercial reasons". Peter Bone MP and David Jones MP were reported as calling for Rose to resign.

Documents disclosed by the bank to Farage following his submission of a subject access request showed that the decision by the bank's Wealth Reputational Risk Committee to close his accounts, according to the 40-page dossier, was in part due to his views being considered incompatible with the bank's "values or purpose". The dossier showed that Farage was classed as a "lower risk" politically exposed person (PEP). The bank considered declassifying Farage as a PEP on their next review in 2022. His status was maintained, however, in 2023, owing to his public profile and reported links to Russia.

Within the document, an update to Farage's notes from 10 March 2023 stated "The relationship has been below commercial criteria for some time and upon review of Nigel's past public profile and connections, the perceived risks for the future weighed against the benefit of retention the decision was taken to exit upon repayment of an existing mortgage." It adds that continuing to do business with him was "not compatible with Coutts given his publicly-stated views" and the decision was "This was not a political decision but one centred around inclusivity and purpose".

Rose was accused of holding ultimate responsibility for the decision to close Farage's accounts. On 25 July, Rose admitted to a "serious error of judgement" in discussing Farage's Coutts accounts with Jack, while the NatWest board said that it retained full confidence in her. Later that day, Rose resigned as CEO of NatWest Group with immediate effect.

On 26 July, Farage called on the whole of the NatWest board to resign. On 27 July, Coutts chief executive, Peter Flavel stepped down with immediate effect. Then-UK Prime Minister Rishi Sunak expressed support for Farage in his dispute with the bank.

In October 2023, it was reported that the ICO ruled that Rose twice violated the law, as it upheld two parts of Farage’s complaint concerning the treatment of his personal data, but the ICO later withdrew the comment about Rose, and apologised to her, saying that their ruling related only to NatWest. In the same month, an investigation by lawyers Travers Smith, appointed by NatWest, found that the bank had acted in a "lawful" manner when it closed Farage's account, but had "failed to treat him fairly". The Financial Conduct Authority said that the report by Travers Smith revealed "potential regulatory breaches" by the bank. Farage described the Travers Smith report as a “whitewash”.

In March 2025, Farage settled his dispute with NatWest, and the bank apologised. The terms of the settlement were not disclosed.

== Reaction ==
Criticism has been laid at some media organisations for their coverage. Miqdaad Versi said some outlets have disproportionately focused on Farage's financial affairs while neglecting similar instances involving the de-banking of Muslim organisations and individuals. In 2014, when HSBC closed the accounts of several Muslim organisations in the UK, garnering similar concerns around freedom of speech and religion, HSBC stated that decisions to close the accounts were "absolutely not based on race or religion". In 2016, the Co-op Bank closed the bank account of the pro-Palestinian non-governmental organisation Friends of Al-Aqsa, the Palestinian Solidarity Campaign, and approximately 25 other Palestinian-affiliated organisations. The closures were said to have occurred without providing any explanation for the action. At the time, the government commented saying it had delegated to banks the role of de-risking their clients for potential suspicious financing or money laundering.

Gina Miller, a pro-European Union activist, had her bank account for her political party closed down by Monzo with no explanation. Monzo subsequently stated that it did not provide bank accounts for political parties and that it had approved the account by mistake in the first place. Farage, a political opponent of Miller, called it "plain wrong" for her account to be closed down.

British journalist Emily Maitlis criticised the media coverage for "whipping up a populist storm" over the affair, claiming that the incident was a private company making a commercial decision to end a relationship, over political views. She went on to say Farage had somehow turned "utter entitlement into victimhood", given he had been offered a standard account rather than a private banking account.
