= Robin Maxwell-Hyslop =

British politician

Sir Robert John "Robin" Maxwell-Hyslop (6 June 1931 – 13 January 2010) was a British Conservative Party politician.

== Early life ==
The younger son of Royal Navy Captain Alexander Henry Maxwell-Hyslop AM and his wife Cecilia Joan Bayly, the young Maxwell-Hyslop was educated at Stowe School and Christ Church, Oxford. His father was an officer in the Royal Navy who while serving on HMS Devonshire in 1929 was decorated for his courage in averting its loss by explosion. Later in his career he was Captain of HMS Cumberland. In 1925, Alexander Hyslop adopted the additional surname of Maxwell.

== Career ==
Maxwell-Hyslop worked for the aero engine division of Rolls-Royce from 1954 to 1960.

He unsuccessfully fought the Derby North constituency for the Conservatives at the 1959 general election. In 1960, Derick Heathcoat-Amory, member of parliament for Tiverton, was elevated to the peerage, and Maxwell-Hyslop was elected as his successor at the resulting by-election. He held the seat until he retired at the 1992 general election, to be succeeded by Angela Browning. He was knighted in the 1992 New Year Honours.

Maxwell-Hyslop was the longest-serving member ever of the Commons Select Committee on Trade and Industry, from 1971 to 1992. (The select committee structure was altered in 1979, with Maxwell-Hyslop continuing to serve on the committee in its new form.) He was also the last Conservative member to ask Prime Minister Margaret Thatcher a question at Prime Minister's Questions.

== Personal life ==
In 1968, he married Joanna Margaret, daughter of Thomas McCosh, of Pitcon, Dalry, North Ayrshire; they had two daughters.

Maxwell-Hyslop's sister Anthea Peronelle Maxwell-Hyslop is the mother of the fashion designer Serena Bute.

== Sources ==
- The Times Guide to the House of Commons, Times Newspapers Ltd, 1966, 1987 & 1992
- Leigh Rayment's Historical List of MPs

Parliament of the United Kingdom
Preceded by Derick Heathcoat Amory	Member of Parliament for Tiverton; 1960–1992	Succeeded by Angela Browning
