= Samuel Amory =

A portrait of Amory held in the collection at Knightshayes Court.

Samuel Amory (1784–1857) was an English lawyer and one of the founding partners of the law firm now known as Travers Smith.

== Biography ==
London-born Amory married Ann Heathcoat, the daughter of the well-known and highly successful industrialist John Heathcoat (born 1783), known for inventing lace-making machinery in Nottingham.

Amory qualified as a lawyer in London in 1810, and went into partnership with John Coles, which lasted until 1839 when John became ill, and he was paid out his capital in installments. A short partnership with Isaac Sewell and Samuel Moores lasted only for eleven years.

Samuel and Ann had two children, John (1829-1914) and Ann (1827–69). John, who took the surname Heathcoat-Amory, became a very eminent landowner in Somerset and the owner of a rather splendid estate in Devon known as Knighthayes. He was made a baronet in 1876.

Ann married John Travers, a member of the most famous produce family in the City of London, which remained a client of her father's legal practice for over fifty years. Following marriage into the Smith family, Joseph Travers Smith joined Amory's practice in 1851, later becoming the senior partner and giving his name to the firm, which is still practicing today.

Samuel Amory died in 1857.
