= Alan Amory =

South African academic

- Born: Rustenburg, South Africa

Alan Amory (born in Rustenburg, South Africa) is a Senior Programme Specialist (Learning Technologies) at SAIDEPreviously, Alan was a professor of educational technologies at the University of Johannesburg, where he promotes and drives the use of educational technologies. He has contributed to numerous fields of research, including information and communication technologies in education, video games and learning, tool-mediated knowledge construction, authentic learning, and Cultural Historical Activity Theory (CHAT).

== Career ==
Amory received his doctorate in Plant Biochemistry from the University of the Witwatersrand in Johannesburg. He lectured in the Biology Department of the University of KwaZulu-Natal for 15 years before he was employed as the Director of the Centre for Information Technology in Higher Education at the University of KwaZulu-Natal, Durban. In 2007 he was acting Chief Director for Education Support Services at the Gauteng Department of Education, Johannesburg, before joining the Faculty of Education at the University of Johannesburg in November that year where, in 2011, he became Head of the Department of Mathematics, Science, Technology and Computer Education.

In 2012, Amory was appointed as Director of the Centre for Academic Technologies at the same university.

== Research ==
Amory is evaluated by the National Research Foundation of South Africa (NRF) as a B-Rated researcher. This rating is done by national and international peers and reviewers and a B-Rating is defined as Researchers who enjoy considerable international recognition by their peers for the high quality and impact of their recent research outputs Amory's research focuses on the use of computer games as educational tools and his papers were some of the first written on this subject. Together with other researchers, Naicker, Vincent and Adams, he identified a number of useful design criteria for educational games. The Game Object Model was developed, which includes abstract attributes, such as pedagogical and theoretical ideas useful in the conceptualisation of the game, and concrete attributes − the design elements used to construct the game.

The main body of Amory's research concentrated on developing frameworks to support the design, construction, evaluation and use of computer games in teaching and learning, but also the development and critical appraisal of other educational technologies. He wrote a number of critiques of the use of information and communication technologies in teaching and learning, challenging the notion of learning from technology, an instructivist position The Vygotskian notion of tool-mediated knowledge construction, a core principle in learning while playing computer games, formed the basis for the development of a framework to include all educational artifacts into a coherent framework to support teaching and learning with technology. This framework is based on three interrelated concepts: Cultural Historical Activity Theory, authentic tasks and technology-mediated knowledge construction and is called the CAT framework.

== Publications ==
Amory is the author of 29 peer-reviewed articles, 25 peer-reviewed conference proceedings and 106 conference presentations.

Selected publications include:

- Amory, A. (2011). Pre-service teacher development: A model to develop critical media literacy through computer game-play. Education as Change, 15(sup1), 111–122.
- Amory, A. (2011). Play games to learn: Pre-service teacher development. In T. Bastiaens & M. Ebner (Eds.), Proceedings of World Conference on Educational Multimedia, Hypermedia and Telecommunications 2011 (pp. 2119–2128). Chesapeake, VA: AACE. [Best paper award]
- Amory, A (2010). "Education technology and hidden ideological contradictions". Educational Technology & Society. 13 (1): 69–79.
- Amory, A (2010). "Learning to play games or playing games to learn? A health education case study with Soweto teenagers". Australasian Journal of Educational Technology. 26 (6): 810–829. doi:10.14742/ajet.1044.
- Amory, A (2008). "Academic Administration Puppet Master/Sicelankobe? The Consequences". South African Journal of Higher Education. 22 (3): 498–514. doi:10.4314/sajhe.v22i3.25799.
- Amory, A., Gravett, S., & Van der Westhuizen, D. (2008). Teaching and learning at the University of Johannesburg: a position paper.
- Amory, A (2007). "It's not about the tool, it's about the ideology". South African Journal of Higher Education. 22 (6): 655–671.
