= Heathcoat-Amory baronets =

Baronetcy in the Baronetage of the United Kingdom

Heathcoat-Amory baronetcy
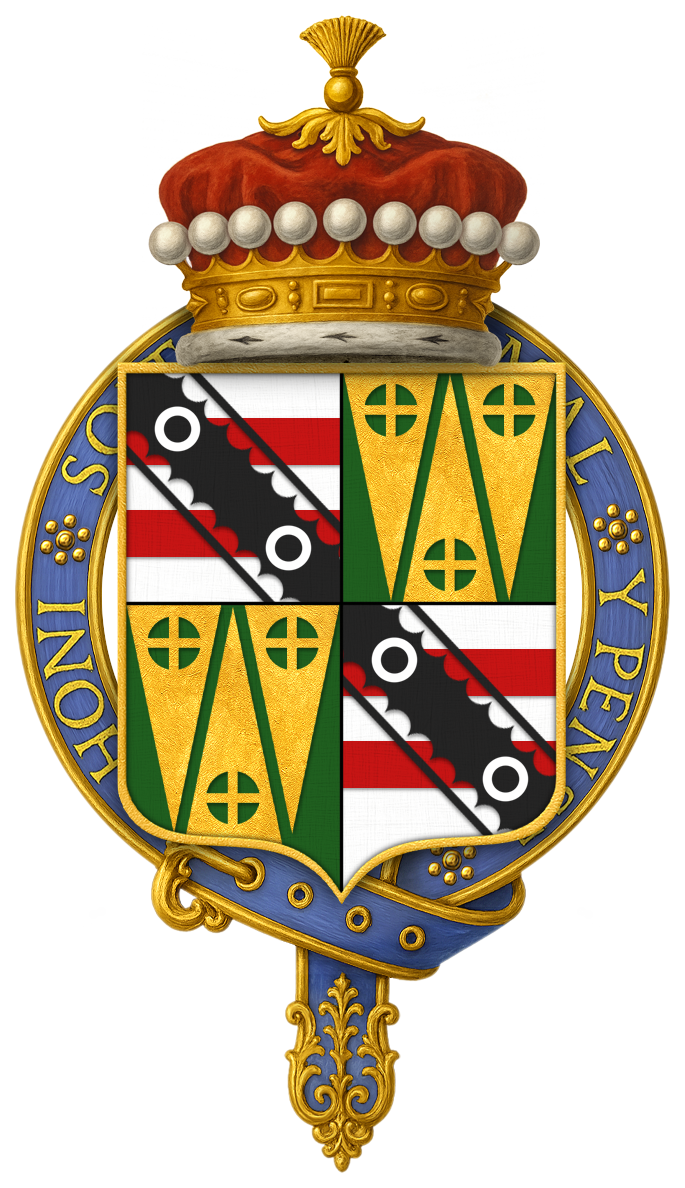
- The coat of arms of the 4th Baronet, displaying his coronet as Viscount Amory
- Creation date: 1874
- Created by: Queen Victoria
- Baronetage: Baronetage of the United Kingdom
- First holder: John Heathcoat-Amory
- Present holder: Sir Ian Heathcoat-Amory, 6th Baronet
- Heir apparent: William Francis Heathcoat-Amory
- Motto: Amore non vi (Latin for 'By love, not force')

The Heathcoat-Amory baronetcy, of Knightshayes Court in Tiverton in the County of Devon, is a title in the Baronetage of the United Kingdom. It was created on 21 March 1874 for John Heathcoat-Amory, a businessman and Liberal politician. Born as John Amory, he was the maternal grandson of John Heathcoat and assumed by Royal licence the additional surname of Heathcoat. The baronetcy descended from father to son until the 1972 death of his grandson, the third Baronet. The latter was succeeded by his younger brother, the fourth Baronet, who was a Conservative politician. In 1960, twelve years before he succeeded to the baronetcy, he was raised to the Peerage of the United Kingdom as Viscount Amory, of Tiverton in the County of Devon. Lord Amory was unmarried and on his death in 1981, the viscountcy became extinct. He was succeeded in the baronetcy by his younger brother, William, the fifth Baronet. The title is currently held by the latter's eldest son, the sixth Baronet, who succeeded in 1982.

== Heathcoat-Amory baronets, of Knightshayes Court (1874) ==
- Sir John Heathcoat-Amory, 1st Baronet (1829–1914)
- Sir Ian Murray Heathcoat-Amory, 2nd Baronet (1865–1931)
- Sir John Heathcoat-Amory, 3rd Baronet (1894–1972)
- Sir Derick Heathcoat-Amory, 4th Baronet (1899–1981), created Viscount Amory in 1960 (see below)
- Sir William Heathcoat-Amory, 5th Baronet (1901–1982)
- Sir Ian Heathcoat-Amory, 6th Baronet (born 1942)

The heir apparent to the baronetcy is William Francis Heathcoat-Amory (born 1975), eldest son of the 6th Baronet.

== Viscounts Amory (1960) ==
- Derick Heathcoat-Amory, 1st Viscount Amory (1899–1981)

== Extended family ==
- Captain Ludovic Heathcoat-Amory (1881-1918), son of Sir John Heathcoat-Amory, died of wounds in France on 25 August 1918, aged 37, while serving with the Royal 1st Devon Yeomanry (attached 32nd Division H.Q.). He was mentioned in despatches and is buried at Daours Communal Cemetery Extension on the Somme. Sons of Ludovic Heathcoat-Amory:
  - Captain Patrick Gerald Heathcoat-Amory (1912-1942), was killed in action during the North African Campaign on 27 May 1942, aged 30, while serving with the Royal Artillery (seconded to 2 Indian Field Regiment, Royal Indian Artillery). He obtained a 2nd Class Honours Degree at Christ Church, and also served in the Oxford University Air Squadron from 1932 to 1934 and the Royal Devon Yeomanry in 1934. He is commemorated on the Alamein Memorial.
  - Michael Ludovic Heathcoat-Amory (1914-1936), killed in an aeroplane accident aged 22.
  - Major Edgar Fitzgerald Heathcoat-Amory (1917-1944), was killed in action during Operation Overlord on 23 June 1944, aged 26, while serving with the 126 Field Regiment Royal Artillery. He is buried at the Ranville War Cemetery in the Calvados department of France.
- Roderick Heathcoat-Amory (1907–1998), youngest son of the second Baronet, was a Brigadier in the Army and was awarded the MC. His son is the Conservative politician David Heathcoat-Amory.
