= Harry Stanley (cricketer) =

English cricketer

Harry Cecil Stanley (16 February 1888 – 18 May 1934) was an English amateur first-class cricketer, who played eight matches for Yorkshire County Cricket Club between 1911 and 1913, when he also played for the Yorkshire Second XI.

Stanley was born in Rotherham, Yorkshire, England, and was a right-handed batsman, who scored 155 runs at 11.92, with a best of 43 against Middlesex. He took six catches in the field but did not bowl.

He died in May 1934 in Scarborough, Yorkshire.
