= Sir John Heathcoat-Amory, 3rd Baronet =

English cricketer

John Heathcoat-Amory
Personal information
- Full name: John Heathcoat-Amory
- Born: 2 May 1894; Mayfair, Middlesex, England
- Died: 22 November 1972 (aged 78); Tiverton, Devon, England
- Batting: Right-handed
- Bowling: Right-arm fast-medium
- Relatives: Henry Stanley (cousin); Mike Groves (nephew); Ludovic Heathcoat-Amory (nephew)

Domestic team information
- Years: Team
- 1928: Minor Counties
- 1914–1935: Devon
- 1914: Oxford University

Career statistics
Competition	First-class
Matches	6
Runs scored	137
Batting average	27.40
100s/50s	0/1
Top score	67*
Balls bowled	839
Wickets	15
Bowling average	23.80
5 wickets in innings	0
10 wickets in match	0
Best bowling	4/52
Catches/stumpings	1/–
- Source: Cricinfo, 25 October 2013

Sir John Heathcoat-Amory, 3rd Baronet (2 May 1894 – 22 November 1972) was an English cricketer. Heathcoat-Amory was a right-handed batsman who bowled right-arm fast-medium.

== Early life and war service ==
The son of Sir Ian Heathcoat-Amory, 2nd Baronet and Alexandra Georgina Seymour, Heathcoat-Amory was born at Mayfair, Middlesex. He was educated at Ludgrove School and Eton College, where he played cricket in the Eton v Harrow fixtures of 1912 and 1913, captaining the college in the latter year. After leaving Eton, he studied at Christ Church, Oxford, where he played first-class cricket for the university cricket club. His first match was against Middlesex, making two further appearances in that season against the Free Foresters and GJV Weigall's XI. He also played in minor counties cricket for Devon in 1914, playing a single match against Berkshire, taking ten wickets in the match.

He fought in the First World War serving in the Devonshire Regiment. He served during the war in the British Raj, Mesopotamia, Persia and Russia. By the war's end he had reached the rank of captain.

== Later life ==
Following the war, Heathcoat-Amory resumed playing minor counties cricket for Devon, and was appointed county captain in 1921. He held the office for Justice of the Peace for Devon in 1922. In 1926, he was selected to play a first-class fixture for the Free Foresters against Oxford University, scoring his only first-class half century with a score of 67 not out in the Free Foresters first-innings. In 1927 he played a first-class match for the West of England against the touring New Zealanders, and in 1928 he made a final first-class appearance for a combined Minor Counties cricket team against the touring Indians. He continued to play for Devon regularly until 1932, before making a final appearance for the county in 1935.

Following the death of his father in 1931, he succeeded to the title of 3rd Baronet of the Heathcoat-Amory baronets. He married Joyce Wethered, the four times champion of the British Ladies Amateur Golf Championship, on 6 January 1937. He held the position of High Sheriff of Devon in 1942, and later the Deputy Lieutenant of Devon in 1952. He died at Knightshayes Court near Tiverton, Devon on 22 November 1972. As he died without issue, he was succeeded as the 4th Baronet by his brother Derick Heathcoat-Amory.

Baronetage of the United Kingdom
Preceded by Ian Heathcoat-Amory	Baronet (of Knightshayes); 1931–1972	Succeeded by Derick Heathcoat-Amory
