= Travers Smith =

Corporate law firm of London

Travers Smith LLP
- Headquarters: London, United Kingdom
- No. of offices: Two (London and Paris)
- No. of lawyers: Approximately 370
- Major practice areas: General practice
- Key people: Andrew Gillen (senior partner); Edmund Reed (managing partner)
- Revenue: £215 million (2023/24)
- Profit per equity partner: £1.3 million (2023/24)
- Date founded: 1810 (London)
- Company type: Limited liability partnership
- Website: www.traverssmith.com

Travers Smith LLP is a corporate law firm headquartered in London, United Kingdom. It advises national and multinational companies in the UK and internationally across the full range of corporate and commercial matters.

In 2023/24 Travers Smith achieved total revenues of £215 million and profits per equity partner of £1.3 million. It is regarded as forming part of the "Silver Circle" of leading UK law firms and is one of the oldest firms in the City of London, having been founded in 1810.

== History ==
The firm was founded by Samuel Amory, who qualified in 1810. Samuel's daughter, Ann, married John Travers, a member of a well-known produce family in the City of London which was a long-standing client of the practice. Their grandson, Joseph Travers Smith, joined the firm in 1851 and became its senior partner. One of the firm's partners drafted the constitution for the London Stock Exchange in 1801.

Historian Charles Sharman described Joseph Travers Smith as the solicitor to "the Westminster Bank and to numerous old families from Royalty downwards". The firm was joined by Stephen Braithwaite in 1873, when the practice became known as Travers Smith Braithwaite, a name it retained until 2004 when it was shortened to Travers Smith.

Following the Second World War, the firm grew steadily through organic expansion. Since the 1990s the firm has not followed the strategy of mergers and overseas expansion adopted by most of its UK-based peers choosing to remain an independent firm.

Travers Smith opened an office in Berlin, Germany in 2001; the office was closed in January 2007, with all of its lawyers moving to Salans.

Travers Smith converted to a limited liability partnership in July 2008.

Travers Smith was voted UK Law Firm of the Year in 2007 and 2012.

In July 2023, the company was appointed by NatWest Group to review its decision to close Nigel Farage's Coutts bank account. The law firm published its initial findings in October 2023.

== Main practice areas ==
Travers Smith's services include:

- Alternative Asset Management
- Arbitration
- Asset Management
- Civil Fraud
- Commercial Law
- Competition
- Corporate Advisory
- Corporate Advisory and Governance
- Corporate & Commercial Disputes
- Corporate M&A
- Data Protection
- Derivatives & Structured Products
- Employment
- ESG and Impact
- Finance
- Financial Markets Disputes
- Environment & Regulatory
- Financial Services & Markets
- Funds
- Incentives & Remuneration
- Investigations
- IP & Technology
- Pensions
- Pro Bono
- Public M&A
- Real Estate
- Restructuring & Insolvency
- Secondaries
- Tax
- Technology & Commercial Transactions

== Alumni ==
Notable alumni of the firm include:

- Nicky Morgan
