= Bayonvillers =

Bayenvillers
- Commune
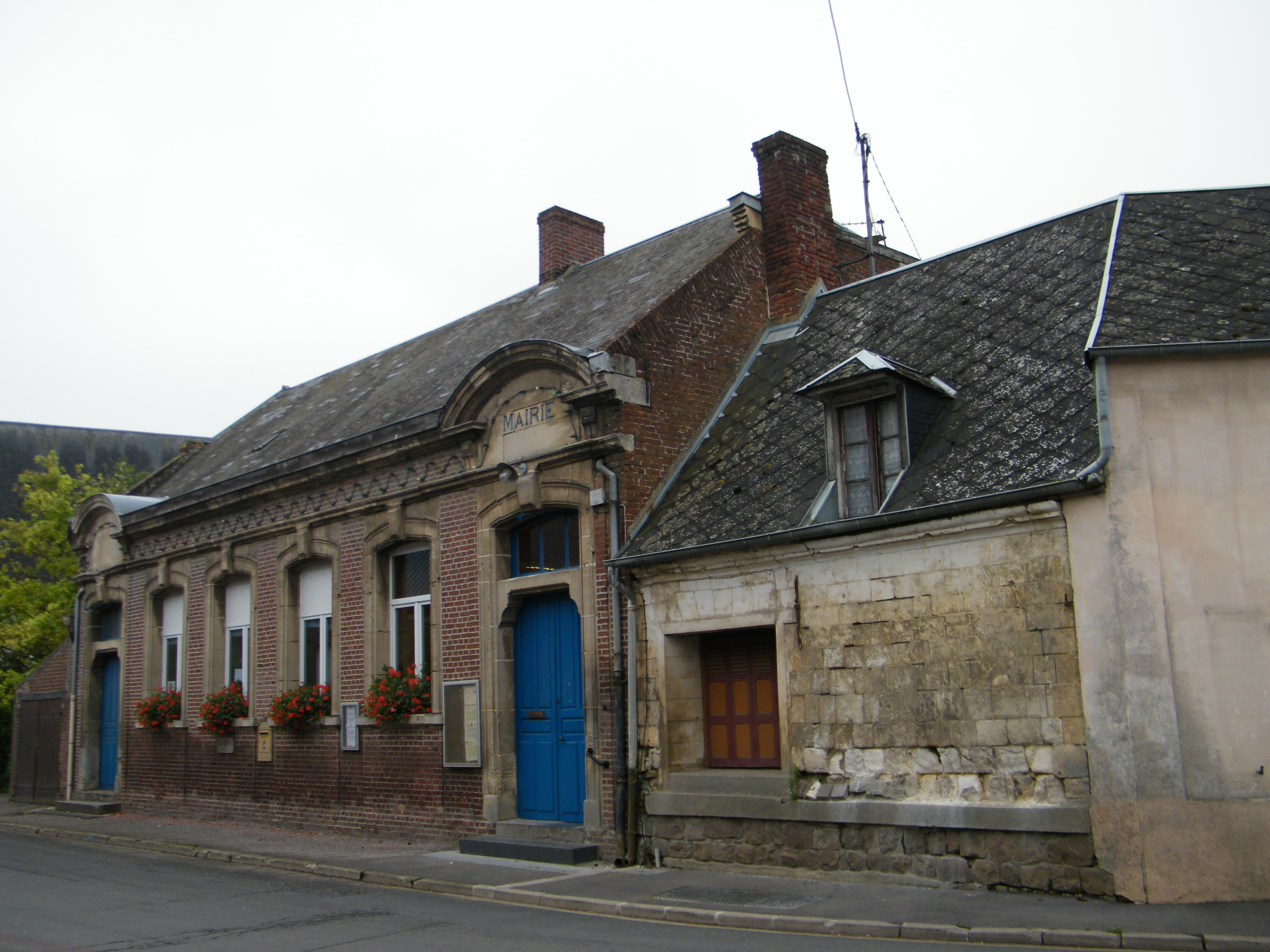
- The town hall of Bayonvillers
- Location of Bayenvillers
- Location within France Location within Hauts-de-France
- Coordinates: 49°51′43″N 2°37′40″E
- Country: France
- Region: Hauts-de-France
- Department: Somme
- Arrondissement: Péronne
- Canton: Moreuil
- Intercommunality: CC Terre de Picardie

Government
  - Mayor (2020–2026): Xavier Palpied
- Area^{1}: 8.1 km^{2} (3.1 sq mi)
- Elevation: 90 m (300 ft)
- Highest elevation: 95 m (312 ft)
- Lowest elevation: 82 m (269 ft)
- Population (2023): 340
  - Density: 42/km^{2} (110/sq mi)
- Time zone: UTC+01:00 (CET)
  - Summer (DST): UTC+02:00 (CEST)
- INSEE/Postal code: 80058 /80170
- ^{1} French Land Register data, which excludes lakes, ponds, glaciers > 1 km^{2} (0.386 sq mi or 247 acres) and river estuaries.

Bayonvillers is a commune in the Somme department in Hauts-de-France in northern France.

== Geography ==
Situated a mile from the A29 autoroute, at the junction of the D337 and D165 roads and 22 miles (35 km) east of Amiens.

== Population ==
Historical population
Year	Pop.	±% p.a.
1968	368	—
1975	288	−3.44%
1982	295	+0.34%
1990	269	−1.15%
1999	345	+2.80%
2007	357	+0.43%
2012	355	−0.11%
2017	340	−0.86%
2023	340	+0.00%
Source: INSEE

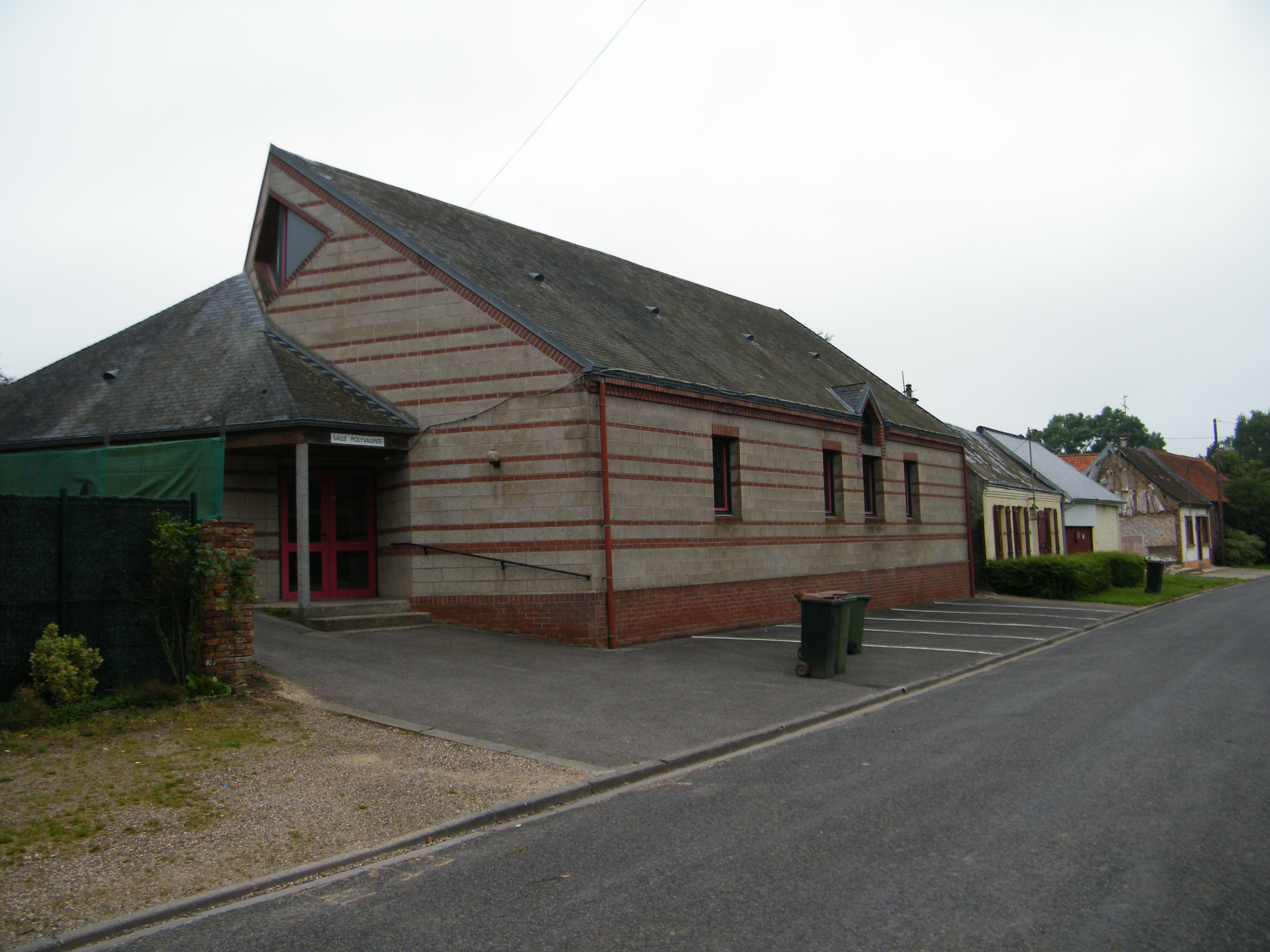
Community hall.

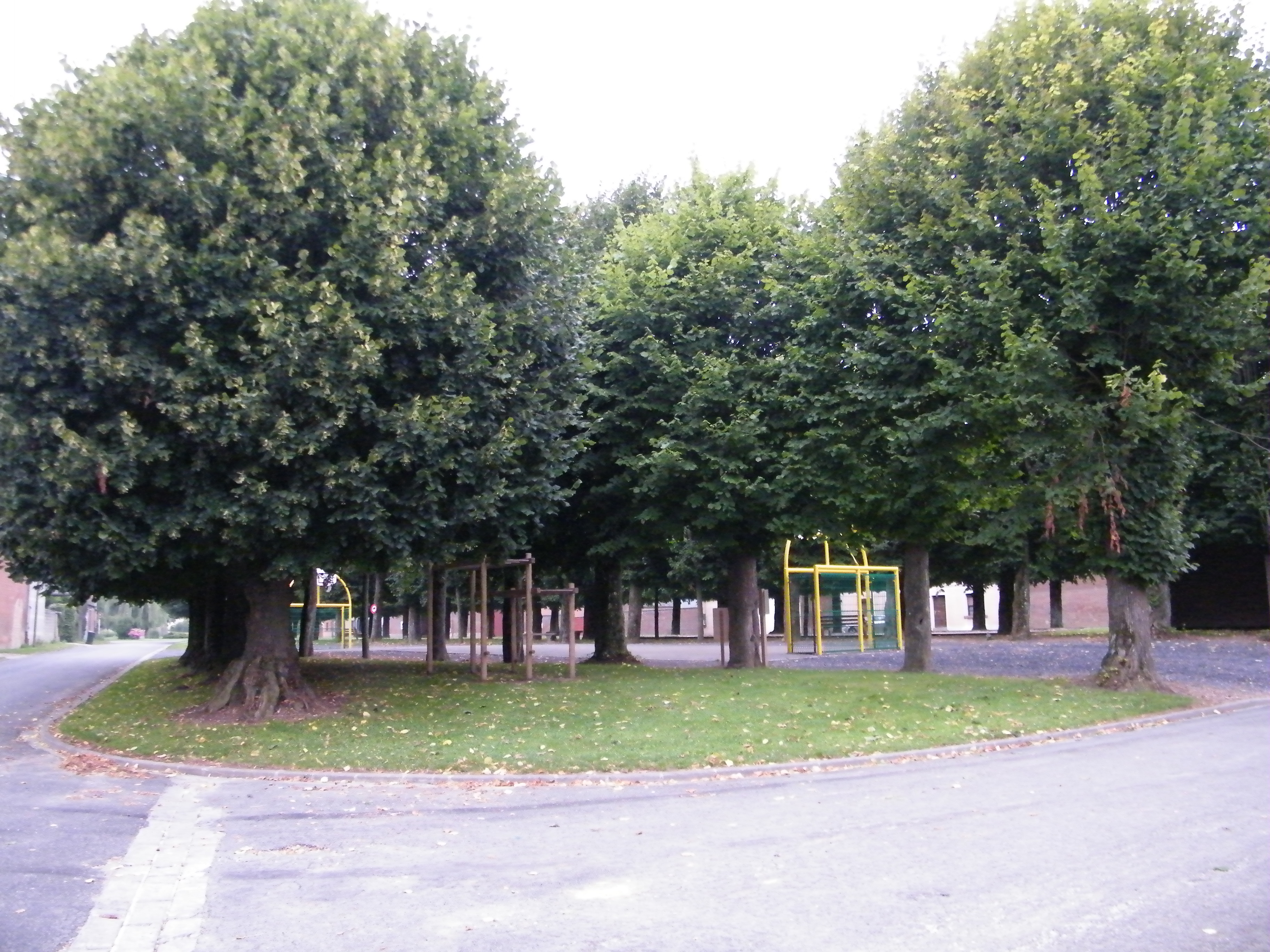
The green.

== See also ==
- Communes of the Somme department
