= Thomas Amory =

Thomas Amory may refer to:

- Thomas Amory (author) (1691–1788), Irish writer
- Thomas Amory (tutor) (1701–1774), English dissenting tutor, minister, and poet
- Thomas Coffin Amory (1812–1889), American lawyer and biographer
- Thomas J. C. Amory (1828–1864), American Civil War officer
