= Joyce Wethered =

British amateur golfer (1901–1997)

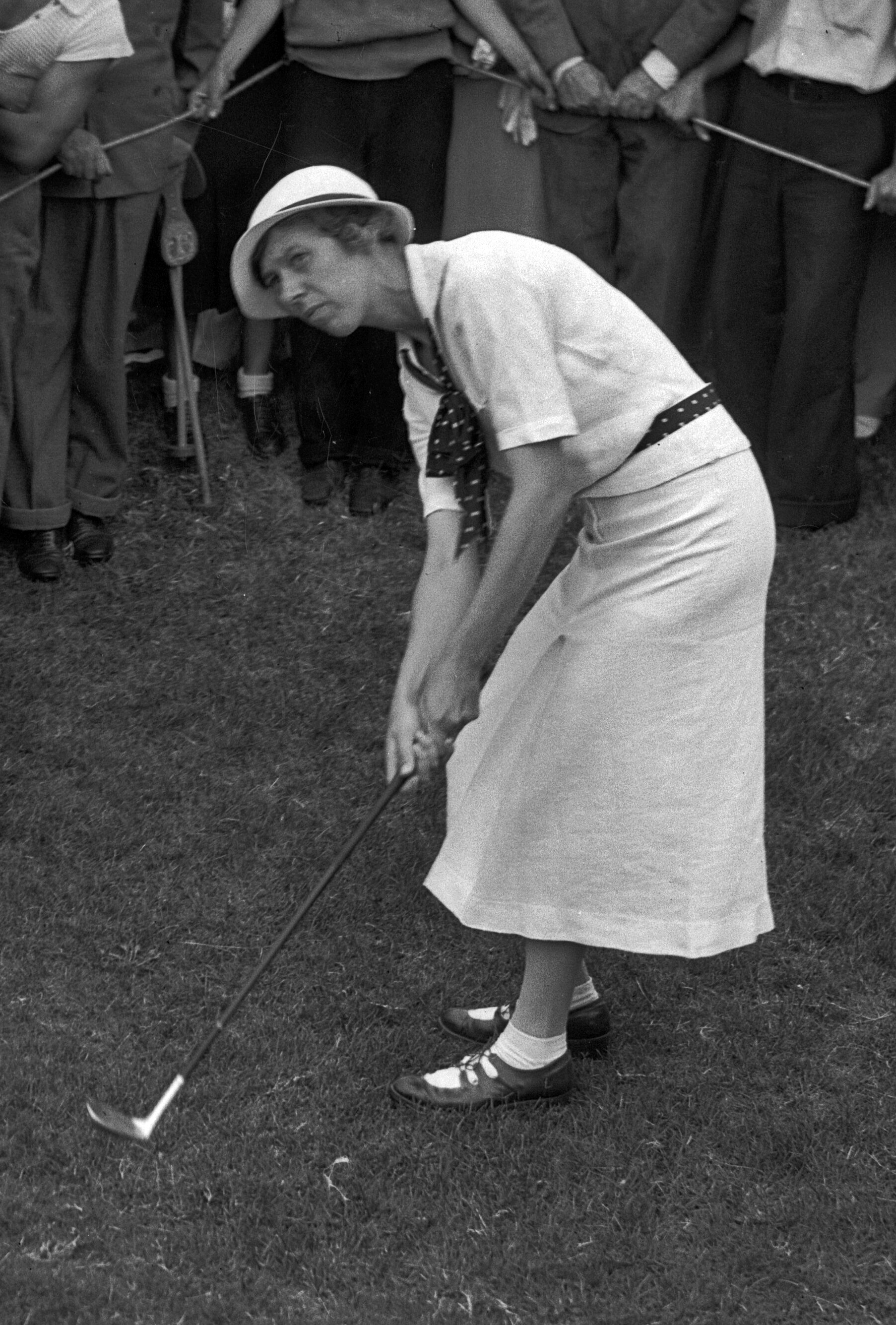
- Wethered in 1935

Personal information
- Full name: Joyce Wethered, Lady Heathcoat-Amory
- Nationality: England
- Born: 17 November 1901 New Malden, England
- Died: 18 November 1997 (aged 96) Knightshayes Court, Devon, England
- Spouse: Sir John Heathcoat-Amory

Career
- Sport: Golf
- Status: Amateur

Achievements and awards
- World Golf Hall of Fame: 1975 (member page)

Joyce Wethered, Lady Heathcoat-Amory (17 November 1901 – 18 November 1997) was a golfer regarded as the leading British woman player of the inter-war period.

== Career ==
Wethered learned the game as a child, as did her brother Roger, who lost a playoff for the 1921 Open Championship. Joyce won the British Ladies Amateur four times (1922, 1924, 1925, and 1929) and the English Ladies' Amateur Championship for five consecutive years (1920–24).

Her play and swing were greatly admired by Bobby Jones, the American champion of the same era. Jones, who played several exhibition rounds with her, had a very high regard for her game. She essentially retired from competitive play by 1930.

She played most of her golf at (and was a member of) Worplesdon Golf Club in Surrey.

An exhibition of memorabilia can be seen at Knightshayes Court in Devon, where she lived.

== Awards and honors ==
In 1975, she was inducted into the World Golf Hall of Fame.

== Personal life ==
She married Sir John Heathcoat-Amory in 1937, and became Lady Heathcoat-Amory.

== Tournament wins ==
- 1920 English Women's Amateur Championship
- 1921 English Women's Amateur Championship
- 1922 British Ladies Amateur, English Women's Amateur Championship
- 1923 English Women's Amateur Championship
- 1924 British Ladies Amateur, English Women's Amateur Championship
- 1925 British Ladies Amateur
- 1929 British Ladies Amateur

== Team appearances ==
Amateur

- Vagliano Trophy (representing Great Britain & Ireland): 1931 (winners)
- Curtis Cup (representing Great Britain & Ireland): 1932 (playing captain)
- Women's Home Internationals (representing England): 1921 (winners), 1922 (winners), 1923 (winners), 1924 (winners), 1925 (winners), 1929 (winners)

== Bibliography ==
- Wethered, Joyce Golfing Memories and Methods (1933) Hutchinson
- Knighthayes National Trust guide 2013, ISBN 978-1-84359-430-7
