= David Heathcoat-Amory =

British politician (born 1949)

The Right Honourable David Heathcoat-Amory
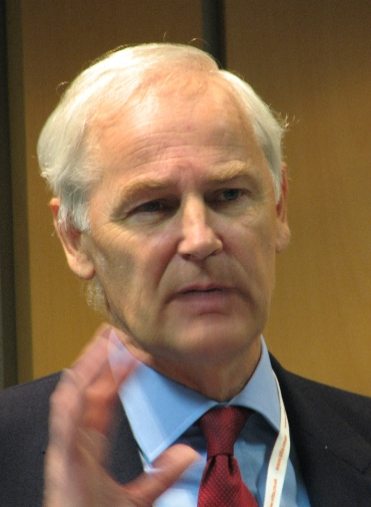

Shadow Secretary of State for Trade and Industry
- In office 26 September 2000 – 14 September 2001
- Leader: William Hague
- Preceded by: Angela Browning
- Succeeded by: John Whittingdale

Shadow Chief Secretary to the Treasury
- In office 19 June 1997 – 26 September 2000
- Leader: William Hague
- Preceded by: Alistair Darling
- Succeeded by: Oliver Letwin

Paymaster General
- In office 20 July 1994 – 20 July 1996
- Prime Minister: John Major
- Preceded by: Sir John Cope
- Succeeded by: David Willetts

Minister for Europe
- In office 27 May 1993 – 20 July 1994
- Prime Minister: John Major
- Preceded by: Tristan Garel-Jones
- Succeeded by: David Davis

Government Deputy Chief Whip in the House of Commons Treasurer of the Household
- In office 15 April 1992 – 27 May 1993
- Prime Minister: John Major
- Preceded by: Alastair Goodlad
- Succeeded by: Greg Knight

Member of Parliament for Wells
- In office 9 June 1983 – 12 April 2010
- Preceded by: Robert Boscawen
- Succeeded by: Tessa Munt

Chair of the European Research Group
- In office 2001–2010
- Preceded by: Michael Spicer
- Succeeded by: Chris Heaton-Harris

Personal details
- Born: David Philip Heathcoat-Amory; 21 March 1949 (age 77)
- Party: Conservative
- Spouse: Linda Adams
- Children: 3
- Parent(s): Roderick Heathcoat-Amory, MC
- Education: Christ Church, Oxford
- Profession: Accountant

David Philip Heathcoat-Amory (Note: (The suffix Amory is pronounced: /ˈeɪmoʊri/)) (born 21 March 1949) is a British politician, accountant, and farmer. He was the Conservative Member of Parliament for Wells in Somerset from the 1983 general election until he lost the seat in the 2010 general election. He became a member of the British Privy Council in 1996. Heathcoat-Amory was previously Chair of the European Research Group.

== Education and professional life ==
David Heathcoat-Amory is the son of British Army Brigadier Roderick Heathcoat-Amory, MC (son of Sir Ian Heathcoat-Amory, 2nd Baronet) and the nephew of Harold Macmillan's Chancellor of the Exchequer Derick Heathcoat-Amory. He was educated at Eton College and Christ Church, University of Oxford, where he received an MA in PPE. He was President of the Oxford University Conservative Association.

Heathcoat-Amory qualified as an accountant in 1974 and joined Price Waterhouse as a chartered accountant. In 1980, he was appointed as the assistant finance director of the British Technology Group (BTG) where he remained until he was elected to Parliament in 1983.

== Political career ==
Heathcoat-Amory contested the seat of Brent South in the London Borough of Brent at the 1979 general election, but was defeated by the sitting Labour MP Laurence Pavitt by 11,616 votes. He was elected to the House of Commons at the 1983 general election for the Somerset seat of Wells, whose sitting MP Robert Boscawen had decided to move to Somerton and Frome following boundary changes. He held the seat with a majority of 6,575.

In Parliament, he was appointed as the Parliamentary Private Secretary (PPS) to the Financial Secretary to the Treasury John Moore in 1985, and was also the PPS to his successor Norman Lamont from 1986. Following the 1987 general election he became the PPS to the Home Secretary Douglas Hurd until he was promoted to the government of Margaret Thatcher as an Assistant Government Whip in 1988. He was promoted to become a Lord Commissioner to the Treasury and Government Whip in 1989. Later in the year he became the Parliamentary Under Secretary of State at the Department for the Environment, until moved by the new Prime Minister John Major to the same position at the Department of Energy in 1990. He was appointed as the Treasurer of the Household (Deputy Chief Whip) following the 1992 general election and was the Minister of State at the Foreign and Commonwealth Office in 1993. He was appointed as the Paymaster General in 1994 where he served until resigning from the government in 1996 over the single European currency. He became a member of the Privy Council in 1996.

In 1997 Heathcoat-Amory joined the Shadow Cabinet of William Hague as the Shadow Chief Secretary to the Treasury, and was the Shadow Secretary of State for Trade and Industry from 2000. He left the frontbench on the election of Iain Duncan Smith as Leader of the Conservative Party in 2001. Heathcoat-Amory was a member of the Treasury Select committee from 2004 until 2005, when he briefly became a spokesman on Work and Pensions under the leadership of Michael Howard, but returned to the backbenches later that year when David Cameron became Conservative leader. He served as the chairman of the All Party Parliamentary Group (APPG) on the British Museum; the vice chair of the Astronomy and Space Environment APPG; and the secretary of the APPG on boxing.

From late 2001 until July 2003, Heathcoat-Amory was one of the two British parliamentary delegates to the Convention on the Future of Europe, which drafted the European Constitution. He is well known for his strong Euroscepticism and was, through the work of the Convention, a fierce opponent of the official drafts being prepared by the presidium of the Convention, criticising them as being too federalist.

Heathcoat-Amory was selected by the Power 2010 democracy and constitutional reform campaign as one of six MPs accused of "failing our democracy" and who "stand in the way of a reforming Parliament". Heathcoat-Amory lost his seat in the 2010 general election to the Liberal Democrat candidate Tessa Munt, who achieved a 6.1% swing.

At the election, UKIP's Jake Baynes was requested by his party to stand down owing to UKIP's policy of not standing a candidate in a constituency where there is already a committed Eurosceptic, but he refused to do so. In interviews, Baynes said he was "offering the public a service no other candidate is". Heathcoat-Amory partly blamed the presence of a UKIP candidate on the ballot paper for his defeat during his speech after the result of the ballot was announced. He also admitted that his involvement in the United Kingdom parliamentary expenses scandal played a part in his defeat.

He was criticised in 2008 after remarking that "They're letting anybody in nowadays" regarding the presence of black Labour MP Dawn Butler. Butler claimed that Heathcoat-Amory assumed she was a cleaner. Heathcoat-Amory denied that his remarks were racist.

Having lost by a relatively narrow margin of 800 votes in the general election in June 2010, Heathcoat-Amory announced to the local party members and media that he would not be contesting the next general election.

== Expenses claims ==
On 12 May 2009, it was reported in The Daily Telegraph that Heathcoat-Amory had charged the taxpayer for manure costing £380 over 3 years on expenses, under the controversial Additional Costs Allowance. In February 2010 it was revealed that he had been asked to repay a total of £29,691.93. The Times dubbed the scandal 'The Manure Parliament' when singling out Heathcoat-Amory's claim.

== Personal life ==
He enjoys angling, growing trees, gardening and astronomy. He married Linda Adams on 4 February 1978 in north Hampshire. The couple lives on an estate in west London with a significant art collection. They have a son, John, and a daughter, Florence (born September 1988). His younger son, Matthew, died of suicide at their second home in Perthshire in 2001. Heathcoat-Amory and his wife Linda said that the family was "deeply shocked" by Matthew's death.

== Notes and references ==
Notes

== Publications ==
- A Single European Currency: Why the United Kingdom Must Say No by David Heathcoat-Amory, 1996, Nelson & Pollard Publishing ISBN 1-874607-11-7
- A Market Under Threat: How the European Union Could Destroy the British Art Market by David Heathcoat-Amory, 1998, Centre for Policy Studies ISBN 1-897969-74-0
- The European Constitution by David Heathcoat-Amory, 2003, CPS

Parliament of the United Kingdom
Preceded by Robert Boscawen	Member of Parliament for Wells; 1983–2010	Succeeded by Tessa Munt
Government offices
Preceded by Alastair Goodlad	Deputy Chief Whip of the House of Commons; Treasurer of the Household; 1992–1993	Succeeded by Greg Knight
Preceded by Tristan Garel-Jones	Minister for Europe; 1993–1994	Succeeded by David Davis
Preceded by Sir John Cope	Paymaster General; 1994–1996	Succeeded by David Willetts
Political offices
Preceded by Angela Browning	Shadow Secretary of State for Trade and Industry; 2000–2001	Succeeded by John Whittingdale
Party political offices
Preceded by Alastair Goodlad	Conservative Deputy Chief Whip in the House of Commons; 1992–1993	Succeeded by Greg Knight
Other offices
Preceded by Michael Spicer	Chairman of the European Research Group; 2001–2010	Succeeded by Chris Heaton-Harris
