= Knightshayes Court =

Victorian country house in Devon, England

Coordinates: 50°55′45″N 3°28′46″W

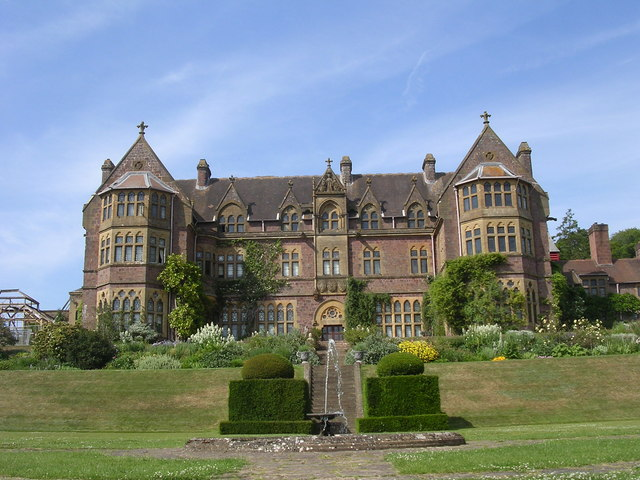
- Façade
- Interactive map of the Knightshayes Court area

General information
- Type: Stately home
- Location: Bolham, Tiverton, Devon, England
- Coordinates: (grid reference SS961151)
- Owner: National Trust

Design and construction
- Designations: Grade I listed

Website
- www.nationaltrust.org.uk/main/w-knightshayescourt

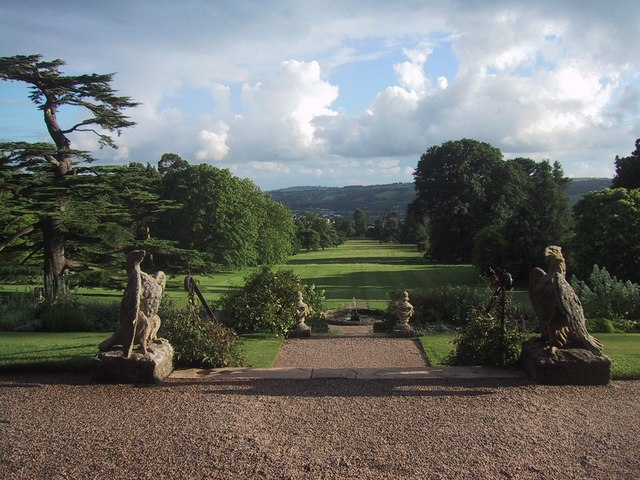
View to the south from the terrace of Knightshayes Court.

Knightshayes Court is a Victorian country house near Tiverton, Devon, England, designed by William Burges for the Heathcoat-Amory family. Nikolaus Pevsner describes it as "an eloquent expression of High Victorian ideals in a country house of moderate size." The house is Grade I listed. The gardens are Grade II* listed in the National Register of Historic Parks and Gardens.

== History ==
Benjamin Dickinson, a wealthy merchant, banker, and mayor of Tiverton, built the first mansion at Knightshayes between 1785 and 1788. His great-grandson, Sir John Walrond, 1st Baronet, sold the Knightshayes estate to Sir John Heathcoat-Amory, 1st Baronet in 1868. The Heathcoat-Amory family, who had established their wealth from lace production, owned much of the manufacturing and land around Tiverton, and Heathcoat-Amory chose the site of Knightshayes, because of its view of his distant factory, nestling in the Exe valley below. He demolished the Dickinson house and built a new mansion slightly above it, which survives today.

== The house ==
Sir John Heathcoat-Amory, 1st Baronet, having purchased the house and estate of Knightshayes in 1867, in the same year commissioned a new replacement house, to the design of William Burges, the foundation stone of which was laid in 1869. The building was complete by 1874, although not to Burges' original designs, and work had begun on the interior. Unlike Burges' partnership with John Crichton-Stuart, 3rd Marquess of Bute, the relationship between architect and client was not successful, Sir John objecting to Burges' designs both on grounds of cost and style. As Crook (1981) commented, "Heathcoat-Amory built a house he could not afford to decorate, by an architect whose speciality was interior design". The disagreement led to the dismissal of Burges in 1874 and his replacement by John Dibblee Crace. Nevertheless, Knightshayes Court remains the only example built of a medium-sized Burges country house, to the "standard" Victorian arrangement. Its virtues were recognised in its own time; "Knightshayes is eminently picturesque, executed with great vigour and thorough knowledge of detail.." The plan with hall, drawing, morning and smoking rooms, library and billiard room is conventional and the exterior is, by Burges's usual standards, restrained. A massive tower, to have been constructed over the West end, would have given the house "a more overtly romantic silhouette" but only the base was built.

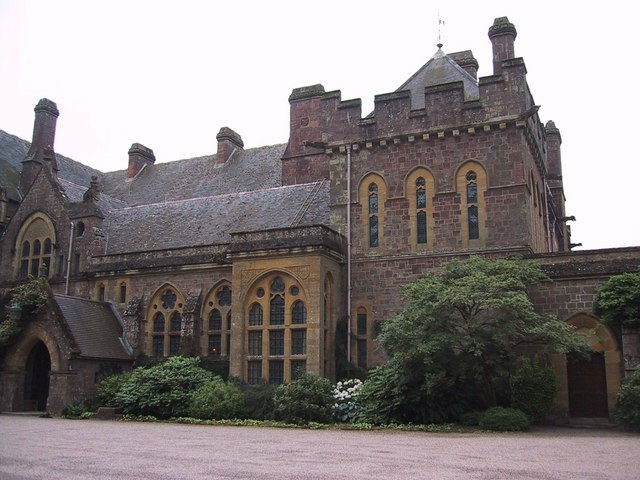
View of the West end of the court showing the base of the intended great tower

The interior, by contrast, was destined to have been a riot of Burgesian excess but "not one of the rooms was completed according to Burges's designs." Of the few interior features that were fully executed, much was dismantled or covered over by Sir John and his successors, who followed the twentieth century distaste for Victorian architecture, and for the work of Burges in particular. The attitude persisted on the National Trust's acquiring the house in 1973. Writing at the time of the acquisition, the then Secretary, Robin Fedden, wrote; "the house was built by an architect called Burgess (sic). I expect it is coming back into fashion but the house could be regarded as irrelevant except as part of the setting in the garden." The new approach since the rehabilitation of the reputation of Burges has seen the Trust seeking to recover and restore as many of Burges's fittings as possible, including some "sparkling" ceilings, such as that in the Drawing Room, which was discovered in 1981, having been boarded over as early as 1889. In a number of instances, the Trust has brought in Burges-designed furniture from other locations, including a bookcase from The Tower House, now in the Great Hall, and a marble fireplace in the Drawing Room, from Burges's redecoration of Worcester College, Oxford. The presentation album which Burges prepared, and which can be seen at the house, shows what might have been. "At Knightshayes Burges was on top form. But (his) magical interiors remained a half-formed dream." The Victorian commentator Charles Locke Eastlake described the house in his A History of the Gothic Revival: "For this quality of design as well as for a certain vigour of treatment, Knightshayes may be considered a typical example of the Revival."

The paintings on display in the house include what is believed to be a self-portrait by Rembrandt, thought to be a study for the version now housed in the Rijksmuseum. This was explored in an episode of the BBC television series Britain's Lost Masterpieces broadcast in 2018.

During the Second World War the house was used as a convalescent home for the U.S. Eighth Air Force.

=== The Heathcoat-Amory family ===
Sir John Heathcoat-Amory, 3rd Baronet, grandson of the 1st Baronet, married Joyce Wethered, the golfer. An exhibition of golfing memorabilia can be found in the house. Roderick Heathcoat-Amory (1907–1998), youngest son of the 2nd Baronet, was a Brigadier in the Army. His son is the former Conservative politician David Heathcoat-Amory, who is the uncle of the former political columnist of the Daily Mail newspaper, Edward Heathcoat-Amory.

== The gardens ==
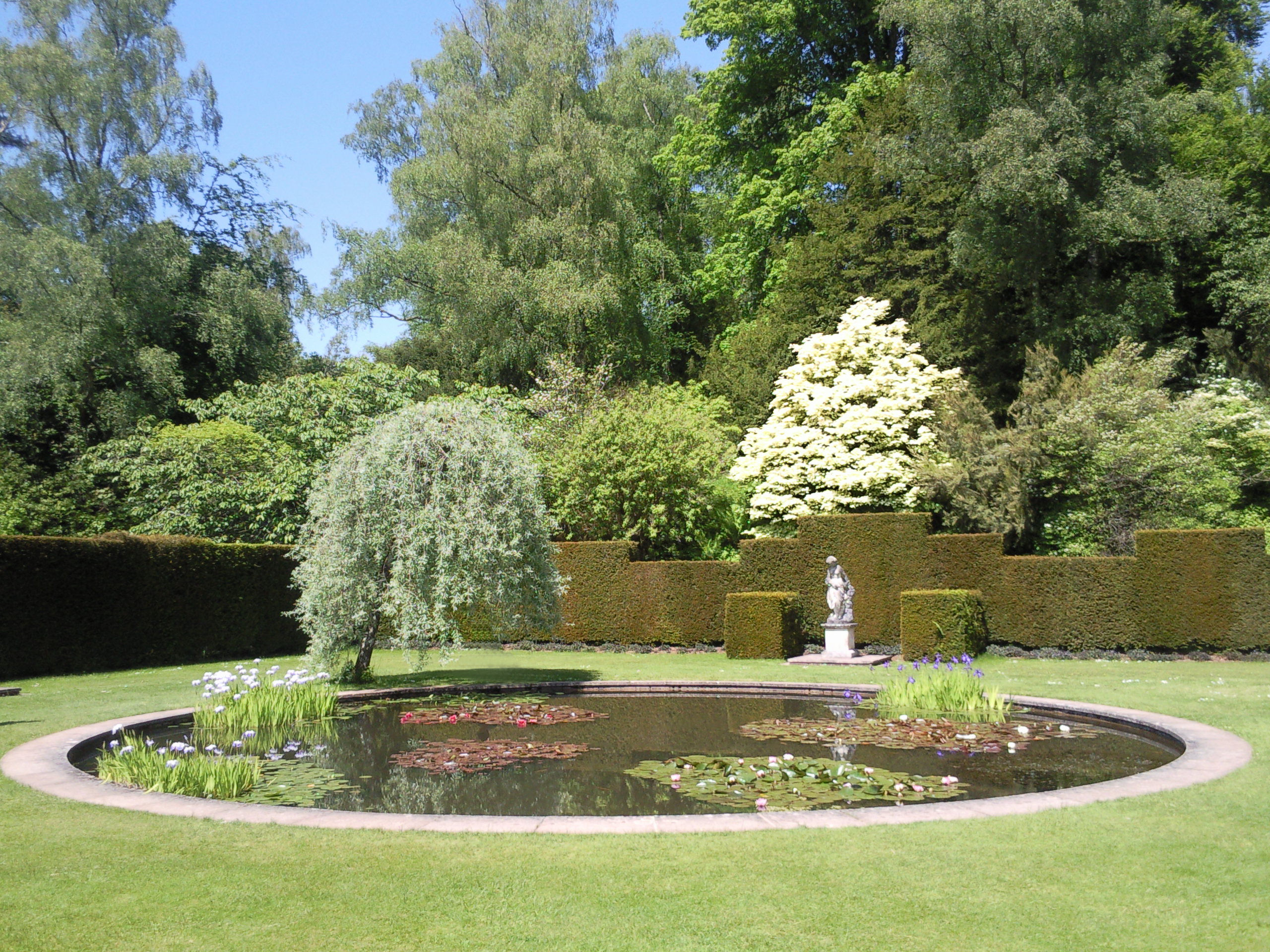
Ornamental Pond at Knightshayes Court

The gardens were designed by Edward Kemp but were much simplified in the 1950s and '60s. Sir John and Lady Heathcoat-Amory undertook much work in the gardens for which they were both awarded the Royal Horticultural Society's Victoria Medal of Honour. They received advice from the American garden designer and writer Lanning Roper, especially on their remodelling of the 19th century bowling green. The estate includes a rare stické court dating from 1907. Other features include the extensive topiary, specimen trees, rare shrubs and the stables and walled kitchen garden, also by Burges. In 2015 the Mid Devon Show was held at Knightshayes Court.

== National Trust ==
Knightshayes Court has been in the ownership of the National Trust since 1972 and has been open to the public since 1974.

== See also ==
- Heathcoat-Amory baronets
