= Cornish Mutual =

British general insurer

- Type: Mutual insurance
- Industry: General insurance
- Founded: 1903
- Headquarters: Truro, Cornwall
- Key people: Peter Beaumont (Managing director); Jeremy Oatey (Chairman)
- Number of employees: 98
- Website: cornishmutual.co.uk

Cornish Mutual is a general insurer based in Cornwall, set up by Cornish farmers in 1903. The company is based in Truro.

The mutual is owned by its members and offers insurance to farms, businesses and people living and working in Cornwall, Devon, Somerset and Dorset.

In 2012, Cornish Mutual gained ‘Chartered Insurer’ status. They were the first mutual insurance company in the UK and the first insurer in the South West to achieve this level of recognition from the Chartered Insurance Institute (CII). In 2019, Peter Beaumont, the firm's financial director, succeeded Alan Goddard as managing director. In 2020, Jeremy Oatey replaced Ian Pawley as chairman.
