= Henry Stanley (cricketer) =

English cricketer

Personal information
- Full name: Henry Thomas Stanley
- Born: 20 August 1873; Belgravia, London, England
- Died: 16 September 1900 (aged 27); Hekpoort, Transvaal Colony
- Batting: Right-handed

Domestic team information
- Years: Team
- 1894–1899: Somerset
- 1897–1898: Marylebone Cricket Club
- FC debut: 24 May 1894 Somerset v Oxford University
- Last FC: 20 July 1899 Somerset v Hampshire

Career statistics
Competition	First-class
Matches	63
Runs scored	1,691
Batting average	14.96
100s/50s	1/4
Top score	127
Balls bowled	262
Wickets	9
Bowling average	27.77
5 wickets in innings	0
10 wickets in match	0
Best bowling	2/11
Catches/stumpings	27/–
- Source: CricketArchive, 2 May 2010

Henry Thomas Stanley (20 August 1873 – 16 September 1900) was an English cricketer who played 63 first-class matches for Somerset County Cricket Club and the Marylebone Cricket Club (MCC) between 1894 and 1899. He was the older son of the wealthy Edward Stanley MP and heir to the Quantock Lodge Estate in Somerset. He gained the rank of Lieutenant in the service of the West Somerset Yeoman Cavalry, and was killed in action during the Second Boer War, at Hekpoort, South Africa in 1900.

An account of his death and burial in South Africa is given in A Yeoman's Letters by P. T. Ross. He has a large granite memorial cross in the churchyard at Over Stowey, Somerset, inscribed:

NOT HERE HE LIES NOT HERE
BUT FAR AWAY IN OTHER EARTH
BY OTHER GRASS OERSPREAD
YET BY HIS HOME
THIS CROSS SHALL STAND & SAY
HE LIVES AMONG HIS OWN
