= Yonge =

Yonge is a surname, pronounced like "young" [jʌŋ]. Notable people with the surname include:

- Charles Duke Yonge (1812–1891), English historian and translator of Philo of Alexandria
- Charles Maurice Yonge (1899–1986), British marine biologist
- Charlotte Mary Yonge (1823–1901), English author
- Sir George Yonge, 5th Baronet (1731–1812), British Secretary at War and the namesake of Yonge Street
- Jane Yonge, New Zealand theatre director
- John Yonge (1465–1516), English bishop and diplomat
- Sir John Yonge, 1st Baronet (1603–1663), English merchant and Member of Parliament
- Nicholas Yonge (1560–1619), English Renaissance singer and publisher
- Roby Yonge (1943–1997), American radio DJ
- Thomas Yonge or Young (1405–1476), MP for Bristol and Gloucestershire, justice of the Common Pleas and the King's Bench
- Walter Yonge of Colyton (1579–1649), English lawyer, merchant and Member of Parliament
- Sir Walter Yonge, 2nd Baronet (1625–1670)
- Sir Walter Yonge, 3rd Baronet (1653–1731)
- William Yonge (disambiguation)

== See also ==
- Yonge Street, a street in Toronto, Ontario, Canada
  - York Regional Road 1, part of Yonge Street in York Region, Ontario
  - York Regional Road 51, part of Yonge Street in Holland Landing, Ontario
  - Simcoe County Road 4, part of Yonge Street in Simcoe County, Ontario
  - Highway 11 (Ontario)
