= Sir Walter Yonge, 3rd Baronet =

English landowner and Whig politician (1653–1731)

Sir Walter Yonge, 3rd Baronet (1653 – 18 July 1731) of Escot in the parish of Talaton, Devon, was an English landowner and Whig politician who sat in the English and British House of Commons between 1679 and 1710.

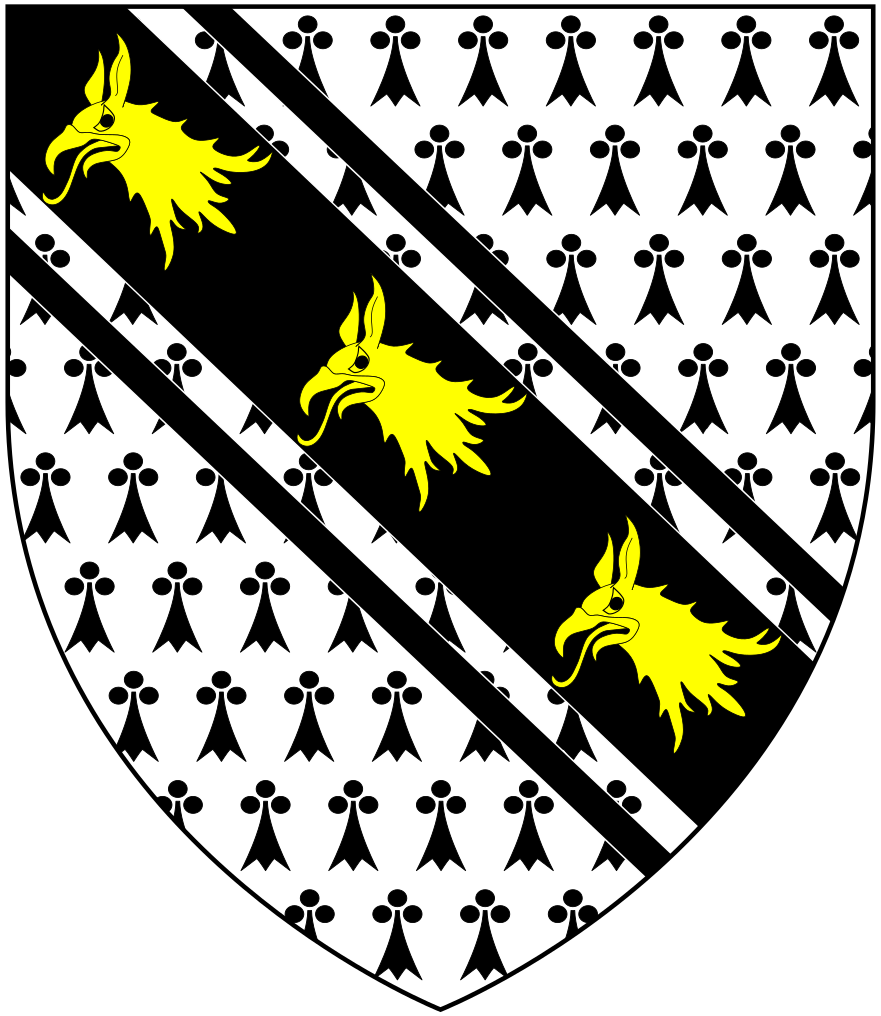
Arms of Yonge: Ermine, on a bend cotised sable three griffin's heads erased or

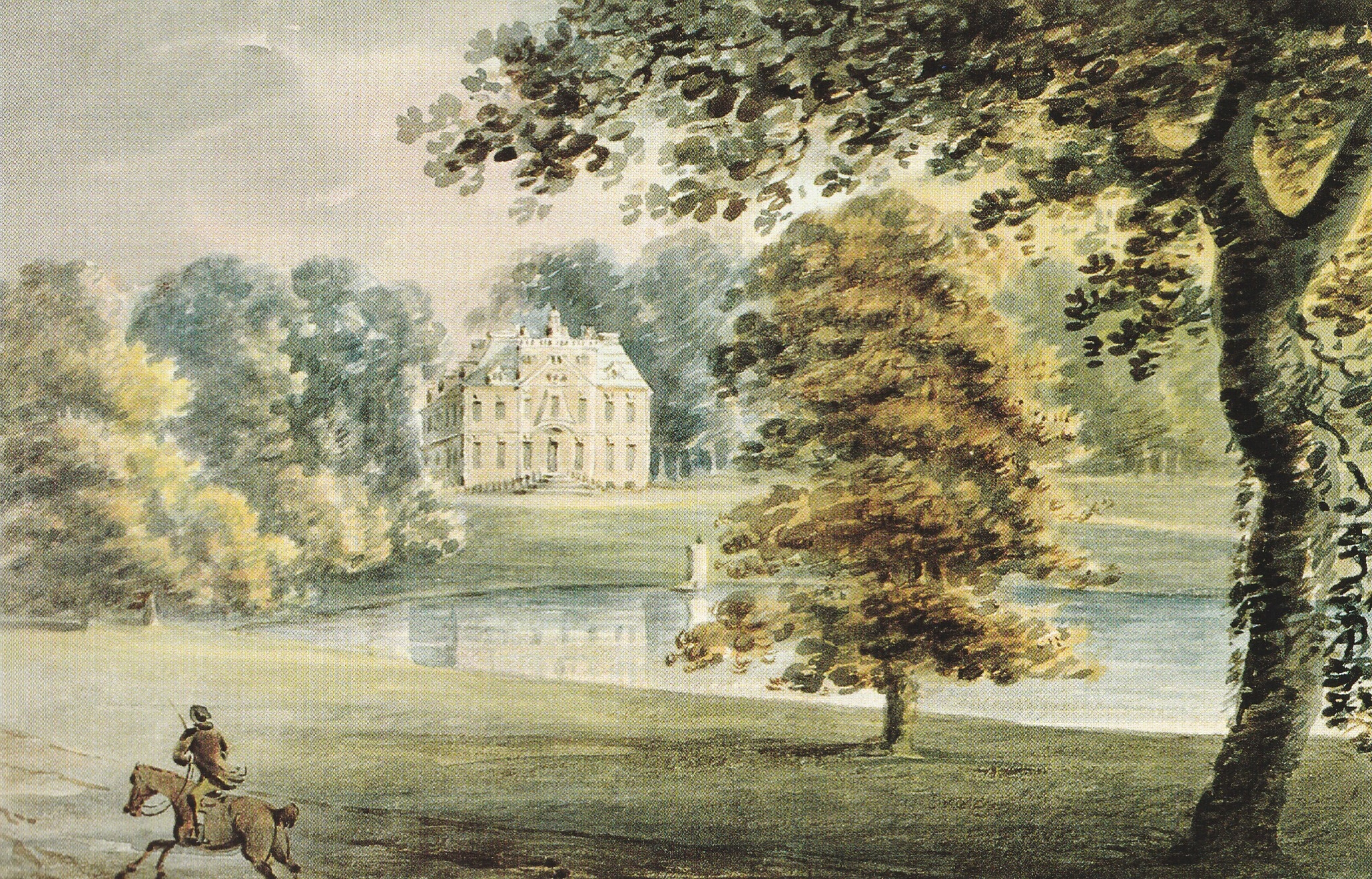
Escot House

== Early life ==
Yonge was baptized on 8 September 1653, the son and heir of Sir Walter Yonge, 2nd Baronet (c.1625–1670) of Great House in the parish of Colyton, Devon and his wife Isabella Davie, daughter of Sir John Davie, 1st Baronet, of Sandford, Devon. He matriculated at Exeter College, Oxford in 1670. He also succeeded his father in the baronetcy in 1670. In 1677, he married Gertrude Morice, the daughter of Sir William Morice, 1st Baronet of Werrington, Devon. In about 1680 he moved from his ancestral seat of Great House, Colyton, having built for himself Escot House, a grand mansion in the parish of Talaton in Devon, to the design of Robert Hooke. His father had purchased the manor of Mohuns Ottery in the parish of Luppit, Devon, and had started to build a new residence there, which the 3rd Baronet discontinued, preferring the situation of Escot.

== Career ==
Yonge was returned as Member of Parliament for Honiton from 1679 to 1689. In 1689 he was returned as MP for Ashburton. At the 1690 English general election, he was returned for Honiton unopposed. He was a teller for the Whigs on several occasions and was a frequent speaker. He was also called upon to help draft many bills. In 1691, he married as his second wife, Gwen Williams, the daughter and coheiress of Sir Robert Williams, 2nd Baronet, of Penrhyn, Caernarvonshire. He was returned unopposed for Honiton again at the 1695 English general election and signed the Association promptly. He voted to fix the price of guineas at 22 shillings on 26 March 1696 and spoke and voted for the attainder of Sir John Fenwick on 25 November 1696. At the 1698 English general election he was returned unopposed again for Honiton and continued to act as teller and speak for the Administration. He was returned unopposed at the first general election of 1701. In November 1701, he resigned as commissioner of customs so that he could retain his parliamentary seat in accordance with the new place clause and was returned in a contest in the second general election of 1701. He was again a frequent teller for the Whigs.

At the 1702 English general election Yonge was returned unopposed again, but he became far less active in Parliament. He voted against the Tack on 28 November 1704. He was returned in a contest at the 1705 English general election, and voted for the Court candidate for Speaker on 25 October 1705. He supported the Court with regard to the 'place clause' in the regency bill on 18 February 1706. He was a teller on several occasions. At the 1708 British general election, he was returned in a contest as a Whig for Honiton. He was involved in the passage of several bills and acted as teller on several occasions. He voted for the impeachment of Dr Sacheverell in 1710. At the 1710 British general election he was involved in a double return at Honiton, and the elections committee decided against his return. He did not stand for Parliament again, but in 1714 he took up the post of Commissioner of Customs again which he held for the rest of his life.

== Death and legacy ==
Yonge on 18 July 1731 and was buried at Colyton. He had a daughter by his first wife and a son and three daughters by his second wife. He was succeeded by his son Sir William Yonge, 4th Baronet.

Parliament of England
Preceded by Sir Courtenay Pole; Peter Prideaux	Member of Parliament for Honiton; 1679–1685; With: Sir Thomas Putt	Succeeded by Edmond Walrond; Sir Thomas Putt
Preceded by William Stawell; Edward Yarde	Member of Parliament for Ashburton; 1689–1690; With: Thomas Reynell	Succeeded by William Stawell; Sir Richard Reynell
Preceded by Richard Courtenay; Edmond Walrond	Member of Parliament for Honiton; 1690–1707; With: Sir William Drake	Succeeded by Parliament of Great Britain
Parliament of Great Britain
Preceded by Parliament of England	Member of Parliament for Honiton; 1707–1710; With: Sir William Drake	Succeeded by Sir William Drake; James Sheppard
Baronetage of England
Preceded by Walter Yonge	Baronet (of Culliton); 1670–1731	Succeeded by William Yonge
