= Sir Walter Yonge, 2nd Baronet =

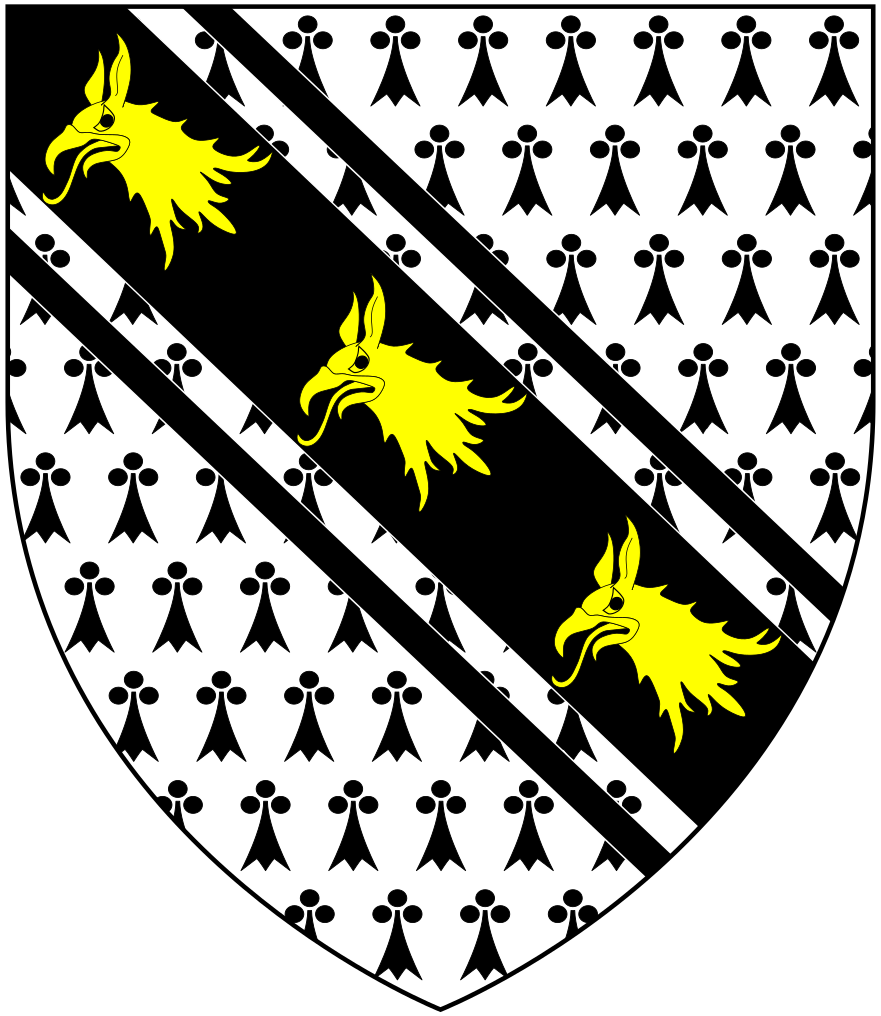
Arms of Yonge: Ermine, on a bend cotised sable three griffin's heads erased or

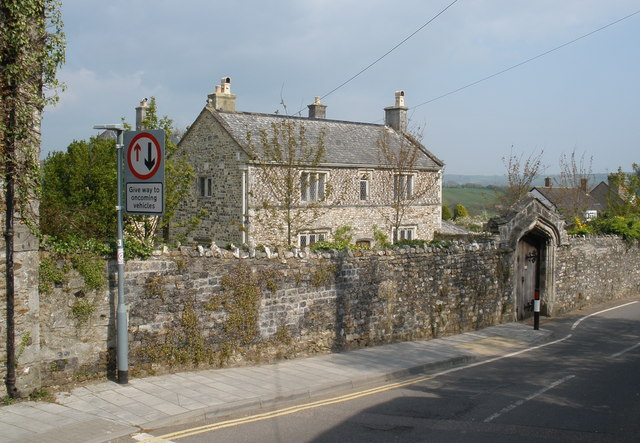
Great House, South Street, Colyton, seat of the Yonge family. Early 17th c., U-shaped plan, possibly remnant of a previous building

Sir Walter Yonge, 2nd Baronet (c. 1625 – 21 November 1670) of Great House, Colyton, and of Mohuns Ottery, both in Devon, was a Member of Parliament for Honiton (1659), for Lyme Regis (1660) and for Dartmouth (1667–70).

== Origins ==
Yonge was the son and heir of Sir John Yonge, 1st Baronet (1603–1663), of Colyton by his wife Elizabeth Strode, daughter of Sir William Strode (1562–1637) of Newnham in the parish of Plympton St Mary, Devon, seven times a Member of Parliament, for Devon in 1597 and 1624, for Plympton Erle in 1601, 1604, 1621 and 1625, and for Plymouth in 1614, Sheriff of Devon 1593-4 and Deputy Lieutenant of Devon in 1599.

== Career ==
He was educated in Leyden and the Inner Temple. In 1659 he was elected Member of Parliament for Honiton, Devon, and in 1660 for Lyme Regis, Dorset, in the Convention Parliament. He inherited the baronetcy on the death of his father in 1663. In 1667 he was elected MP for Dartmouth in Devon, and sat until his death in 1670.

He purchased the manor of Mohuns Ottery intending to move there from Colyton, but died before his planned new mansion house there was completed. According to the Devon historian Polwhele (died 1838), he "had begun to build a seat at the ancient mansion of Mohuns Ottery in the parish of Luppitt, near Ottery, but Sir Walter Yonge, taking a liking to the situation of Escot, purchased it and immediately began to build the present seat". This was his son and heir Sir Walter Yonge, 3rd Baronet (1653–1731), who in about 1680 built Escot House in the parish of Talaton, Devon.

== Marriage and children ==
In 1649 Yonge married Isabel Davie (died 1673), daughter of Sir John Davie, 1st Baronet (c. 1589-1654) of Creedy in the parish of Sandford, Devon, MP for Tiverton 1621–22 and Sheriff of Devon (1629–30). By his wife he had four sons and nine daughters including:

- John Yonge (1651–1668) eldest son and heir apparent who predeceased his father unmarried.
- Sir Walter Yonge, 3rd Baronet (1653–1731), second and eldest surviving son and heir.
- Francis Yonge (1655–1673), third son
- Charles Yonge (born 1658), fourth son
- Isabella Yonge (born 1650), who married Richard Duke (1652–1733), lord of the manor of Otterton, Devon, four times MP for Ashburton, 1679, 1695, 1698 and 1701.

Parliament of England
| Preceded by Sir Edmund Prideaux; Henry Henley | Member of Parliament for Lyme Regis; 1660–1661; With: Thomas Moore 1660; Henry Hyde | Succeeded by Henry Henley; John Shaw |
| Preceded by William Harbord; Thomas Kendall | Member of Parliament for Dartmouth; 1667–1670; With: William Harbord | Succeeded by William Harbord; William Gould |
Baronetage of England
| Preceded by John Yonge | Baronet (of Culliton); 1663–1670 | Succeeded by Walter Yonge |
