= Sir George Yonge, 5th Baronet =

British politician and colonial administrator

Sir George Yonge Bt KCB PC FRS
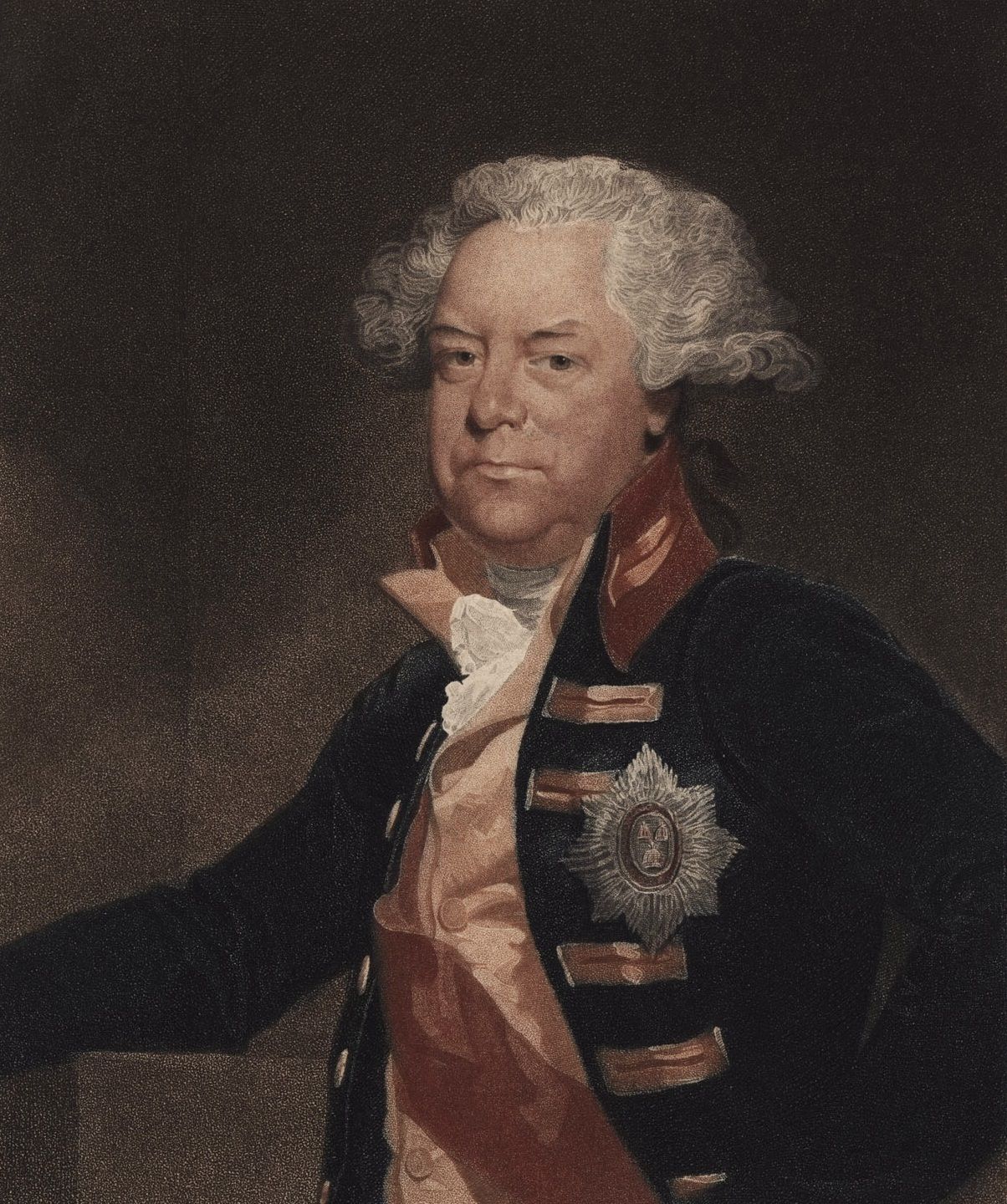
- Engraving by Edmund Scott after a Mather Brown portrait, 1790

Secretary at War
- In office 1783–1794
- Monarch: George III
- Preceded by: Richard FitzPatrick
- Succeeded by: William Windham
- In office 1782–1783
- Monarch: George III
- Preceded by: The Viscount Sydney
- Succeeded by: Richard FitzPatrick

Governor of the Cape Colony
- In office 10 December 1799 – 20 April 1801
- Monarch: George III
- Preceded by: Francis Dundas
- Succeeded by: Francis Dundas

Member of Parliament for Honiton
- In office 1763–1796
- Preceded by: Henry Reginald Courtenay
- Succeeded by: George Chambers
- In office 1754–1761
- Preceded by: Sir William Yonge
- Succeeded by: John Duke

Personal details
- Born: 17 July 1731 Great House, Colyton, Devon, England
- Died: 25 September 1812 (aged 81) Hampton Court Palace, Surrey, England
- Resting place: Colyton, Devon, England
- Spouse: Ann Cleeve (m. 1765)
- Parent: Sir William Yonge (father)
- Education: Eton College
- Alma mater: University of Leipzig

Sir George Yonge, 5th Baronet, KCB, PC, FRS (17 July 1731 – 25 September 1812) was a British politician and colonial administrator who served as Secretary at War from 1782 to 1783 and again from 1783 to 1794. He succeeded to his father's baronetcy in 1755, which became extinct when he died without children. Yonge is remembered by, among other things, the name of Yonge Street, a principal road in what is now Toronto, Canada, so named in 1793 by the Lieutenant-Governor of Upper Canada, John Graves Simcoe.

== Life and career ==
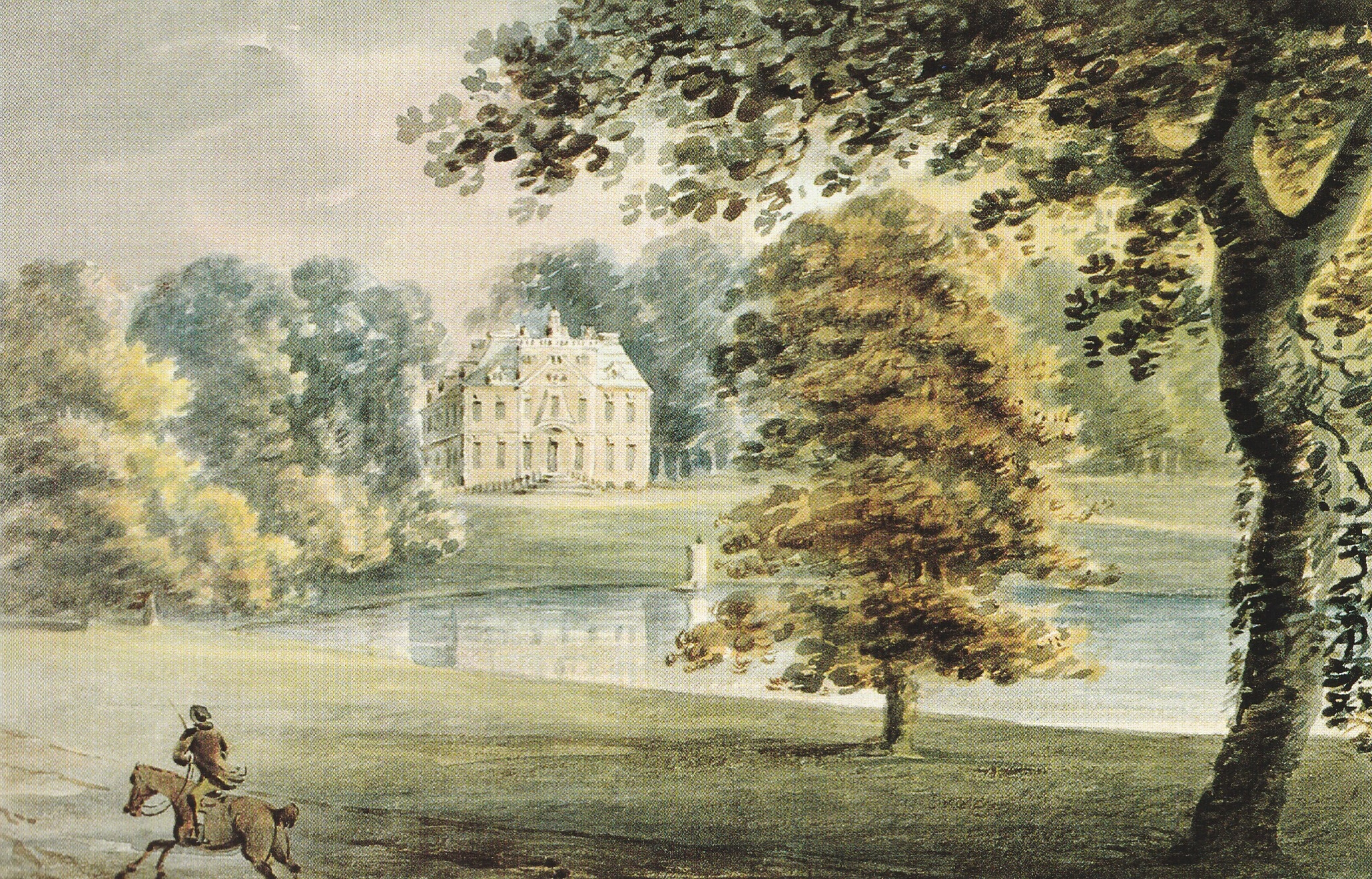
Escot House in 1794

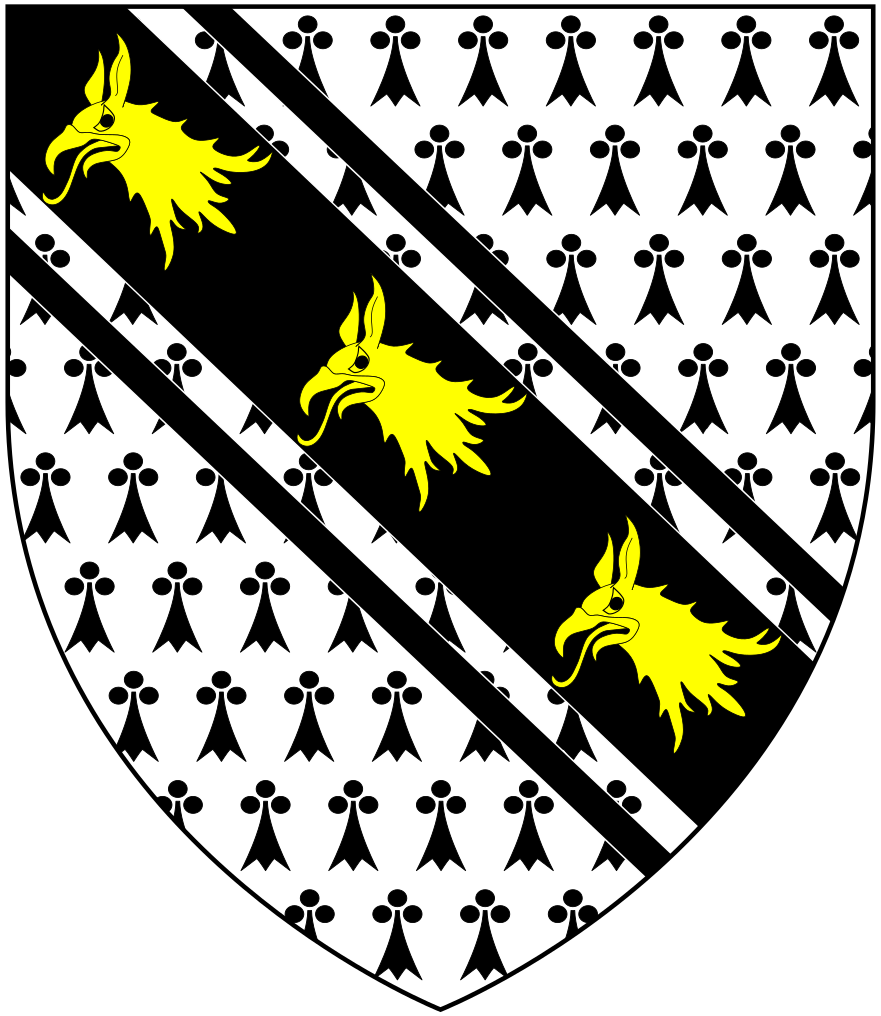
Arms of Yonge: Ermine, on a bend cotised sable three griffin's heads erased or

Yonge was born in 1731 at Great House in the parish of Colyton, Devon, the son and heir of Sir William Yonge, 4th Baronet by his second wife Ann Howard. He had a stepbrother, Walter Yonge, from his father's first wife Mary Heathcote.

He was educated at Eton College and then at the University of Leipzig. He served as a Member of Parliament for his family's Rotten Borough of Honiton, Devon, from 1754 to 1761 and again from 1763 to 1796. He was quoted to have often said that he had inherited £80,000 from his father, acquired another £80,000 when he married and £80,000 from Parliament but Honiton had "swallowed it all," This was due to the huge briberies which were commonplace to influence the electorate in rotten borough elections of the time. Yonge was appointed to the Privy Council of the United Kingdom in 1782, and acted as Governor of the Cape Colony for a short period from 1799 to 1801. He was elected a Fellow of the Royal Society in 1784 and was invested as a Knight of the Bath in 1788.

In 1755, he inherited Escot House near Ottery St Mary, Devon, on the death of his father. In 1794, he sold it for £26,000 to Sir John Kennaway, 1st Baronet, under whose occupancy it burnt down in 1808.

When Yonge died, indebted, on 25 September 1812 at Hampton Court, the baronetcy died with him. Initially he was interred at the place of his death but his remains were later exhumed and transported by sea to be laid to rest in the family crypt in the parish of Colyton. The re-burial was reputed to have taken place by night in fear that his creditors may seize the body.

== Family ==
Yonge married Ann Cleeve, daughter and sole heir of Bourchier Cleeve, on 10 July 1765. Yonge was then 34 years old and Ann 20 or perhaps just 21. Ann's father, two days before his death, changed his will to place restrictions on Ann's inheritance should she marry someone whom her mother deemed inappropriate. Whether this occurred is not clear.

Ann had no children. She died at Hampton on 7 January 1833.

== Legacy ==
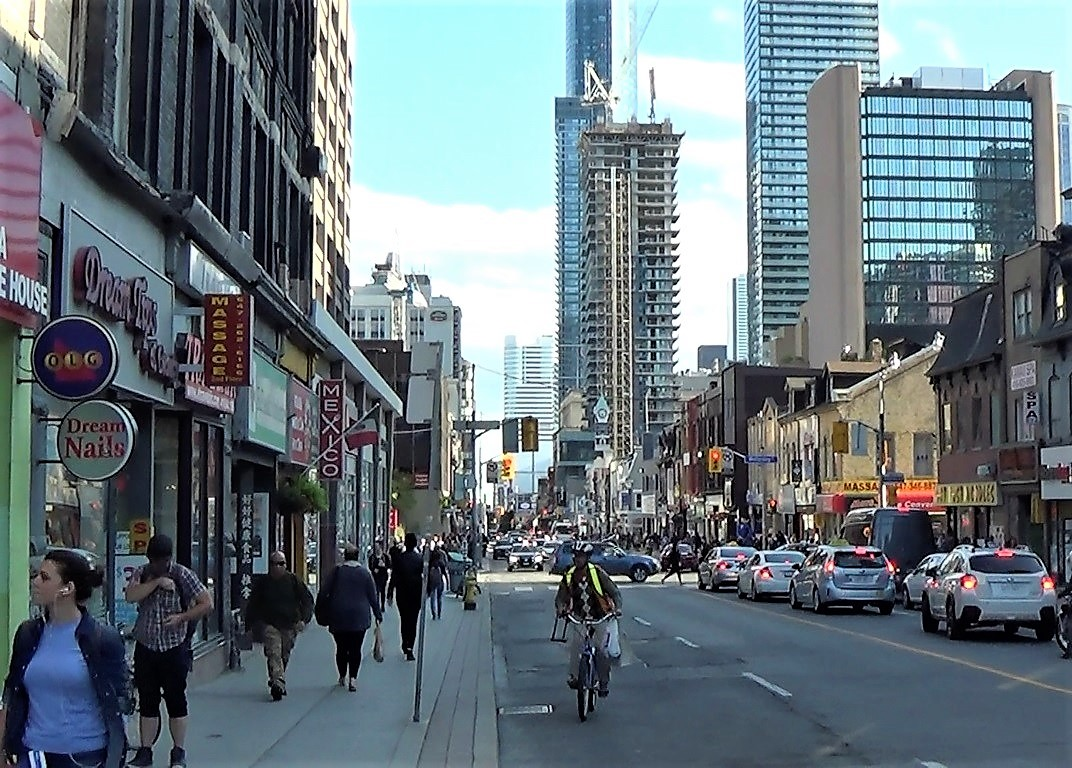
Yonge Street, Toronto

Yonge was considered an expert on Roman roads: 'He was a man of letters, an F.R.S., and a Fellow of the Society of Antiquaries, to which he communicated an excellent memoir on the subject of Roman roads and camps, in connection with some discoveries that had been made at Mansfield, in Nottinghamshire, and hence the peculiar fitness of naming Yonge Street after him, it being precisely such a road, and adapted to similar uses, as those he had been engaged in examining.

Yonge Street, the main north–south street of Toronto, was built between 1795 and 1796 from Eglinton Avenue to Lake Simcoe. Later the road was extended south to Bloor Street and still later, south to Lake Ontario. Yonge Mills Road and Townline Road Escott Yonge in Front of Yonge Township in Mallorytown, Ontario are named for him as well.

Parliament of Great Britain
Preceded by Sir William Yonge, Bt; John Heath	Member of Parliament for Honiton; 1754–1761; With: Henry Reginald Courtenay	Succeeded by Henry Reginald Courtenay; John Duke
Preceded by Henry Reginald Courtenay; John Duke	Member of Parliament for Honiton; 1763–1796; With: John Duke 1763–1768; Brass Crosby 1768–1774; Laurence Cox 1774–1780; Alexander Macleod 1780–1781; Jacob Wilkinson 1781–1784; Sir George Collier 1784–1790; George Templer 1790–1796	Succeeded by George Chambers; George Shum
Preceded by George Hardinge; Charles Williams-Wynn	Member of Parliament for Old Sarum; 1799–1801; With: George Hardinge	Succeeded by Parliament of the United Kingdom
Parliament of the United Kingdom
Preceded by Parliament of Great Britain	Member of Parliament for Old Sarum; 1801; With: George Hardinge	Succeeded by George Hardinge; John Horne Tooke
Political offices
Preceded by Thomas Townshend	Secretary at War; 1782–1783	Succeeded by Richard Fitzpatrick
Preceded by Richard Fitzpatrick	Secretary at War; 1783–1794	Succeeded by William Windham
Preceded by The Marquess Townshend	Master of the Mint; 1794–1799	Succeeded by Lord Hawkesbury
Government offices
Preceded by Francis Dundas, acting	Governor of the Cape Colony; 1799–1801	Succeeded by Francis Dundas, acting
Baronetage of England
Preceded by William Yonge	Baronet (of Culliton); 1755–1812	Extinct
