= George Chambers (MP) =

British politician (1766 – after 1826)

George Chambers (1766 – after 1826), of Hartford, near Huntingdon, Cambridgeshire, was an English soldier, lawyer and Member of Parliament.

== Family ==
Chambers was the son of Sir William Chambers of Whitton Place, Middlesex and his wife Anne née Moore, of Bromsgrove, Worcestershire. He was educated at Lincoln's Inn. In 1784, without their families' permission, he married Jane Rodney, a daughter of George Brydges Rodney, 1st Baron Rodney by his second wife, Henrietta Clies. They had one daughter and eight sons.

== Career ==
He was a Member (MP) of the Parliament of England for Honiton 1796–1802.

Parliament of England
Preceded by George Yonge; George Templer	Member of Parliament for Honiton; 1796–1802; With: George Shum	Succeeded by Sir John Honywood; George Shum
