= Samuel Serle =

English politician

Samuel Serle (1620–1683) was an English politician who sat in the House of Commons between 1656 and 1660.

Serle was the son of Hugh Serle, yeoman of Hale, and was baptised in July 1620. He was apprenticed to a merchant taylor in London in 1638. He was a captain of the militia for Devon in 1650. In 1656, he was elected Member of Parliament for Honiton in the Second Protectorate Parliament. He was a commissioner for assessment in 1657. In 1659, he was re-elected MP for Honiton for the Third Protectorate Parliament. He was commissioner for militia in March 1660 and became a major in April 1660. Also in 1660 he was re-elected MP for Honiton for the Convention Parliament.

In 1679 Serle stood unsuccessfully for parliament again and became commissioner for assessment.

Serle died at the age of 63 and was buried at Honiton on 2 February 1683.

Serle married Mary and had ten sons and two daughters.

Parliament of England
Preceded by Sir John Yonge, 1st Baronet	Member of Parliament for Honiton; 1656–1659; With: Sir Walter Yonge, 2nd Baronet 1659	Succeeded by Not represented in Restored Rump
