= Sir John Yonge, 1st Baronet =

English politician

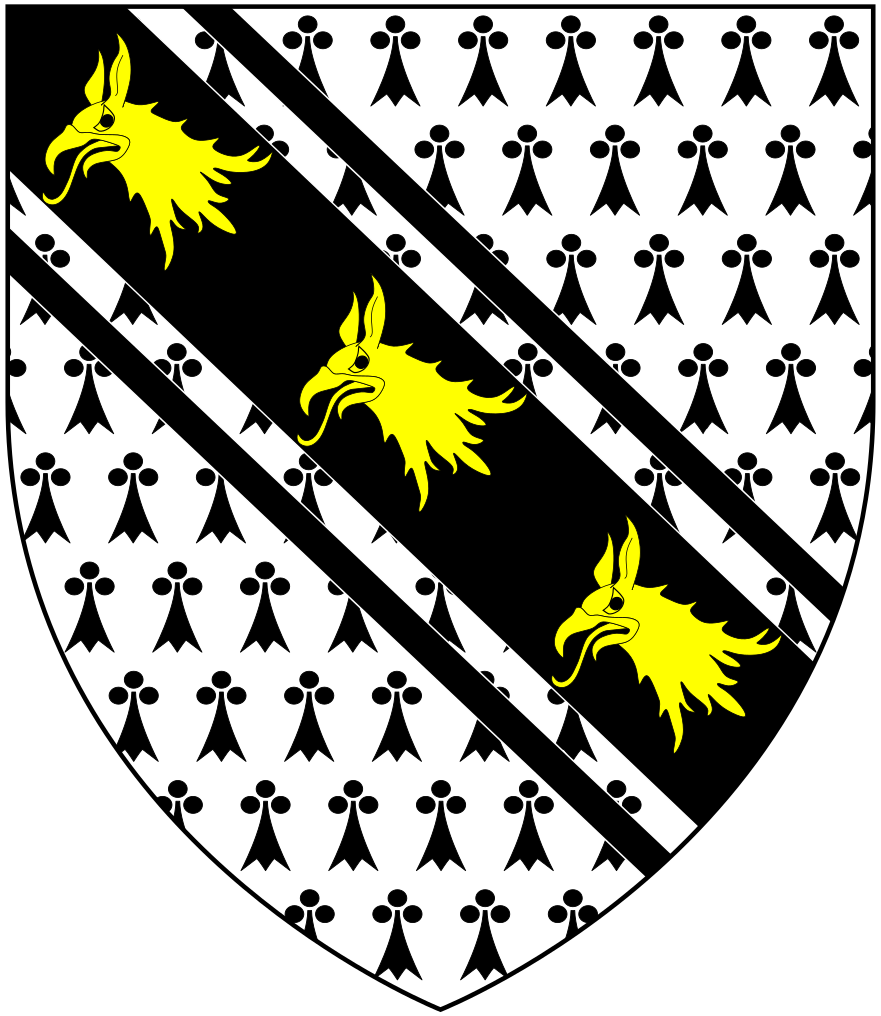
Arms of Yonge: Ermine, on a bend cotised sable three griffin's heads erased or

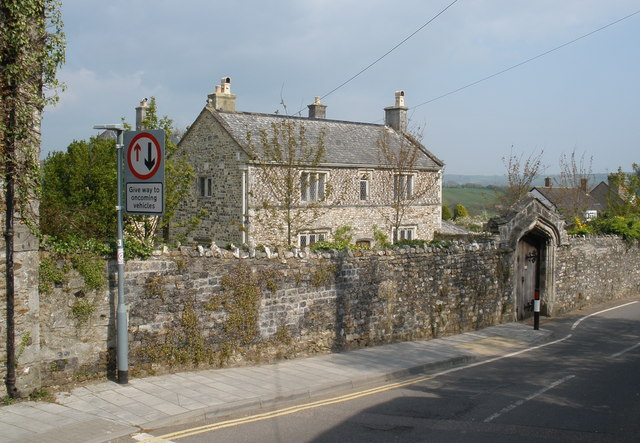
Great House, South Street, Colyton, seat of the Yonge family. Early 17th c., U-shaped plan, possibly remnant of a previous building

Sir John Yonge, 1st Baronet (2 October 1603 – 26 August 1663) of Great House in the parish of Colyton in Devon, was an English politician who sat in the House of Commons variously between 1642 and 1660.

Yonge was the son of Walter Yonge of Colyton and his wife Jane Peryan, daughter of Sir John Peryan. Yonge was a well established merchant and was knighted on 15 September 1625.

In 1642 Yonge was elected Member of Parliament for Plymouth, joining his father (who was already MP for Honiton) in the House of Commons. In December 1648 he was one of the members excluded in Pride's Purge, but returned in the Parliaments of the Protectorate, sitting for Honiton in 1654 and Devon in 1656. In 1660, he was again chosen MP for Honiton in the Convention Parliament.

After the Restoration, Yonge was created a baronet of Culliton on 26 September 1661. He died two years later at the age of 59.

Yonge married Elizabeth Strode and had two sons and a daughter. His son Walter succeeded to the baronetcy.

Parliament of England
Preceded by John Waddon; Robert Trelawney	Member of Parliament for Plymouth; 1642–1648; With: John Waddon	Vacant Seats left vacant after Pride's Purge
Not represented in Barebones Parliament	Member of Parliament for Honiton; 1654–1655	Succeeded by Major Samuel Serle
Preceded by Thomas Saunders, Robert Rolle; Arthur Upton, Thomas Reynell; William Morice, John Hale; William Bastard, William Fry; Sir John Northcote, Henry Hatsell; John Quick	Member of Parliament for Devon; 1656–1658; With: Thomas Saunders, Robert Rolle; Arthur Upton, Thomas Reynell; William Morice, John Hale; Sir John Northcote, Captain Henry Hatsell; Edmund Fowell, John Doddridge	Succeeded by Sir John Northcote; Robert Rolle
Preceded by Samuel Serle; Walter Yonge	Member of Parliament for Honiton; 1660–1661; With: Samuel Serle	Succeeded by Sir Courtenay Pole; Peter Prideaux
Baronetage of England
New creation	Baronet (of Culliton); 1661–1663	Succeeded by Walter Yonge
