= John Peryam =

English politician (1541–c.1618)

Arms of Peryam: Gules, a chevron engrailed between three lion's faces or

John Peryam (1541 – c. 1618), of Exeter, Devon, was elected four times as a Member of Parliament, for Barnstaple 1584, Bossiney 1586, Exeter 1589 and 1593. He served as Mayor of Exeter. He was the younger brother of Sir William Peryam (1534-1604) of Little Fulford, near Crediton in Devon, Lord Chief Baron of the Exchequer.

== Origins ==
John Peryam was born in Exeter, the second eldest son of John Peryam, twice mayor of Exeter, by his wife Elizabeth Hone, a daughter and co-heir of Robert Hone of Ottery. Through his mother's sister, Joan Bodley (née Hone), Peryam was cousin to Sir Thomas Bodley. Like the Bodleys, the Peryams were early adherents of Protestantism and were also threatened in the time of persecutions under Queen Mary I. Under Queen Elizabeth I however, the family thrived.

== Career ==
He served as Bailiff of Exeter in 1574, was an Alderman and Receiver of Exeter 1581-2, Sheriff of Exeter 1582-3 and Mayor of Exeter 1587-8. He was elected four times as a Member of Parliament, for Barnstaple 1584, Bossiney 1586, Exeter 1589 and 1593.

== Landholdings ==
- Creedy Wiger. He purchased his late elder brother Sir William's estate of Creedy Widger, near Crediton, from the latter's four daughters and co-heiresses, and bequeathed it to his eldest daughter Mary Peryam, wife of Richard Reynell (d.1631), a bencher of the Middle Temple, which they made their home.

== Marriages and progeny ==
He married twice:

- Firstly to Elizabeth Prideaux, daughter of Roger Prideaux (d.1582), of Soldon in the parish of Holsworthy, Devon, Sheriff of Devon in 1577 and MP for Totnes in 1545 and 1547, by whom he had three daughters and co-heiresses as follows:

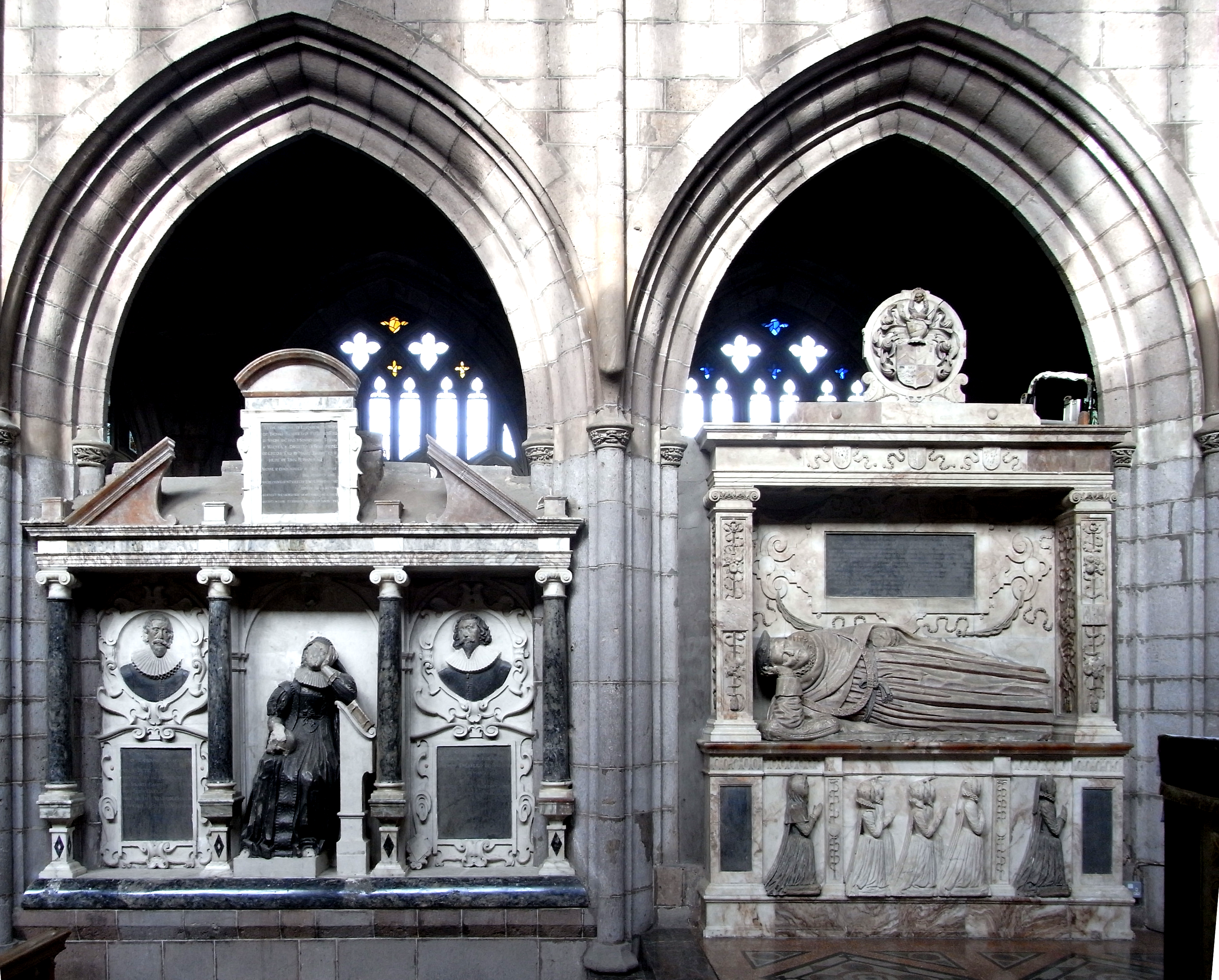
Peryam (right) and Tuckfield (left) monuments in Holy Cross Church, Crediton. The reclining figure at right is Sir William Peryam, of Little Fulford, John Peryam's elder brother. The female seated figure at left is Elizabeth Reynell, heiress of Little Fulford, granddaughter of John Peryam and wife of Thomas I Tuckfield

  - Mary Peryam (d.1662), wife of Richard Reynell (d.1631), a bencher of the Middle Temple, 4th son of George Reynell (d.1568) of Malston. To Mary her father bequeathed his estate of Creedy Wiger, near Crediton (formerly owned by his brother Sir William Peryam) which she and her husband made their home. Richard Reynell also purchased the estate of Little Fulford from two of the four daughters and co-heiresses of Sir William Peryam, namely Mary Peryam, wife of Sir William Pole, and Elizabeth Peryam, wife of Sir Robert Basset. Thus the two estates of Creedy Wiger and Little Fulford were unified in the ownership of Richard Reynell. Their eldest son and heir was Peryam Reynell (1612-1639), who died without progeny leaving his five sisters as co-heiresses. The 2nd sister Elizabeth Reynell (1593-1630) was the heiress of Creedy Widger and Little Fulford and married Thomas Tuckfield (1580/90-1642), the son of John Tuckfield (1555-1630) of Tetburn St Mary, a wealthy cloth merchant. The elaborate Tuckfield Monument in the chancel of Holy Cross Church, Crediton shows the full length seated figure of the heiress Elizabeth Reynell in the centre with the faces in medallions to either side of her husband Thomas Tuckfield (1580/90-1642) (right) and her father-in-law John Tuckfield (1555-1630) (left). The monument is situated next to the elaborate monument of Sir William Peryam.
  - Jane Peryam, wife of Walter Yonge (1579–1649) of Great House in the parish of Colyton, Devon, a lawyer, merchant and notable diarist. This marriage linked the Yonge family with the Pole family of Shute and Colcombe Castle also in the parish of Colyton, as Sir William Pole (1561-1635), MP, married Mary Peryam, daughter of Sir William Peryam (1534-1604) and thus niece of Sir John Peryam. Thus the wife of the famous Devon historian Sir William Pole was the first cousin of the famous Devon diarist Walter Yonge. The Pole and Yonge families long competed for one of the two parliamentary seats of the Rotten Borough of Honiton.
  - Elizabeth Peryam, wife of Edmund Speccot, a member of the Speccot family of Speccot, in the parish of Merton, Devon. Without progeny.
- Secondly to Margaret Peck of Buckarel, widow of a certain Mr Hayes of Lyme Regis, Dorset.

== Sources ==
- Hasler, P.W., biography of Peryam, John (1541-c.1618), of Exeter, Devon, published in The History of Parliament: the House of Commons 1558-1603, ed. P.W. Hasler, 1981
