= Yonge baronets =

Extinct baronetcy in the Baronetage of England

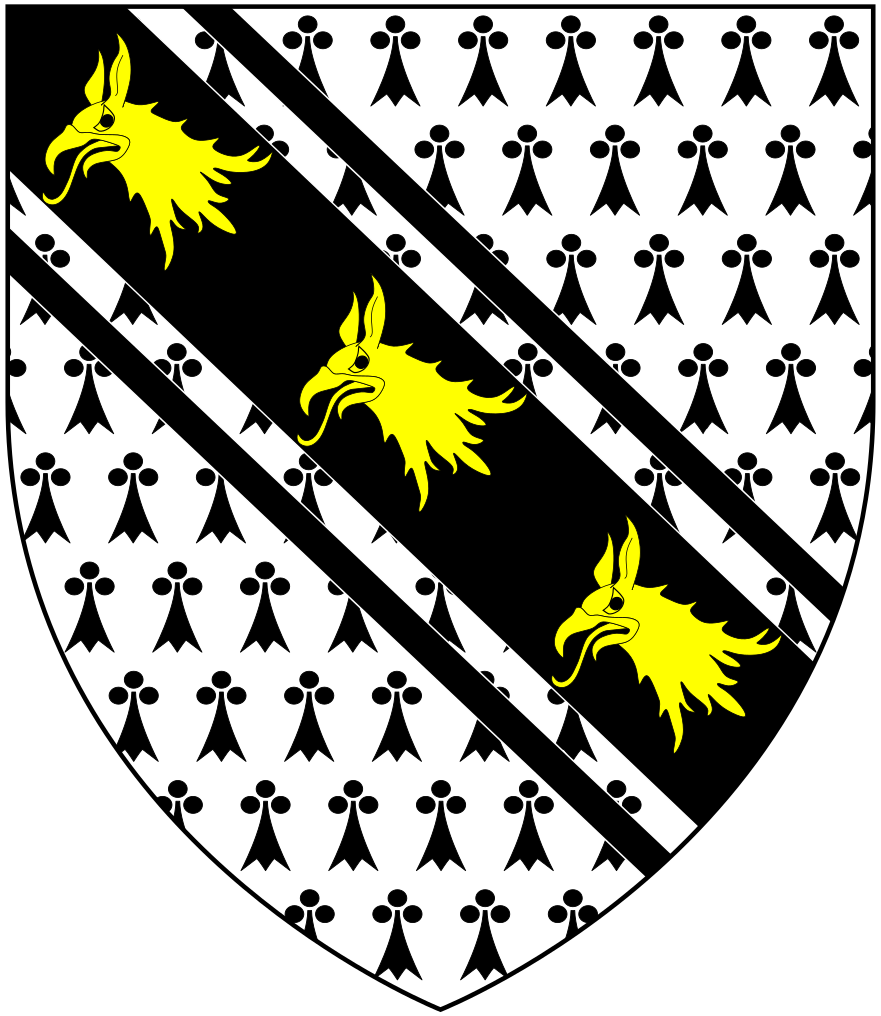
- Escutcheon of the Yonge baronets of Culliton
- Creation date: 1661
- Status: extinct
- Extinction date: 1812
- Arms: Ermine, on a bend cotised sable three griffin's heads erased or

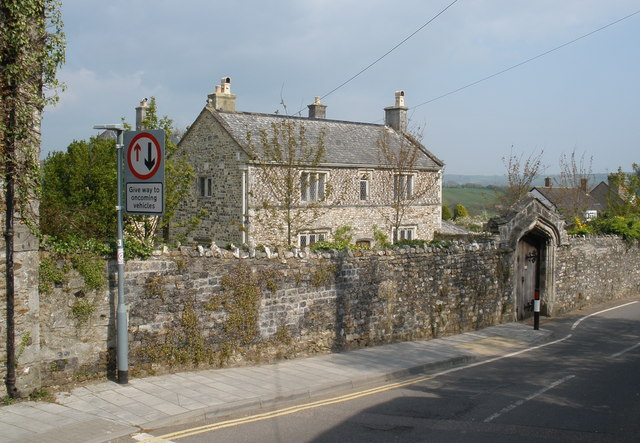
Great House, South Street, Colyton, seat of the Yonge family. Early 17th c., U-shaped plan, possibly remnant of a previous building.

The Yonge Baronetcy, of Culliton (modern: Colyton) in the County of Devon, was a title in the Baronetage of England. It was created on 26 September 1661 for the merchant and Member of Parliament, John Yonge. He was succeeded by his son Walter, the second Baronet. He was also a Member of Parliament. His son, the third Baronet, sat in the House of Commons for more than a quarter of a century. On his death the title passed to his son, the fourth Baronet. He was also a politician and served as Secretary at War. He is also remembered for his diaries. He was succeeded by his son, the fifth Baronet. Like his father he served as Secretary at War and was also Governor of the Cape Colony. The baronetcy became extinct on his death in 1812.

Walter Yonge of Colyton, father of the first Baronet, was a lawyer, merchant and diarist. His great-great-grandfather John Yonge was an ecclesiastic and diplomat.

== Yonge baronets, of Culliton (1661) ==
- Sir John Yonge, 1st Baronet (1603–1663)
- Sir Walter Yonge, 2nd Baronet (c. 1625–1670)
- Sir Walter Yonge, 3rd Baronet (1653–1731)
- Sir William Yonge, 4th Baronet (c. 1693–1755)
- Sir George Yonge, 5th Baronet (1731–1812), died without issue.
