= Escot, Talaton =

Parish near Ottery St Mary, England

Coordinates: 50.7753°N 3.3029°W

Escot House
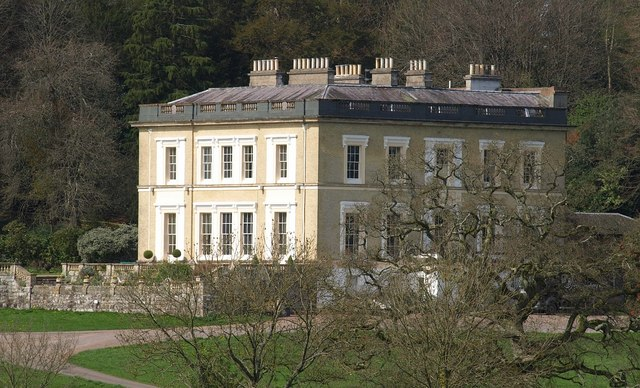
- Escot House, as rebuilt in 1837 by Sir John Kennaway, 2nd Baronet (1797–1873)
- Interactive map of the Escot House area

General information
- Type: Manor House
- Classification: Grade II listed building
- Location: Escot
- Completed: 1838
- Owner: Kennaway baronets

Height
- Roof: Slate

Technical details
- Material: Flemish bond brick
- Floor count: 2
- Grounds: 220 acre (89 ha)

Design and construction
- Architect: Henry Roberts

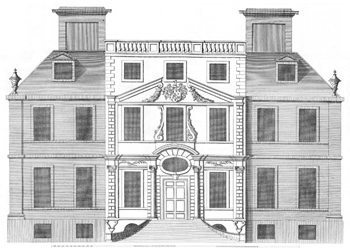
Escot House, as built circa 1684. by Sir Walter Yonge, 3rd Baronet (1653–1731). 1715 illustration in Vitruvius Britannicus. This is the building painted by Swete in 1794 (see below), which burned down in 1808. Pevsner deemed this building "much more interesting" than the surviving replacement

Escot in the parish of Talaton, near Ottery St Mary in Devon, is an historic estate. The present mansion house known as Escot House is a grade II listed building built in 1837 by Sir John Kennaway, 3rd Baronet to the design of Henry Roberts, to replace an earlier house built in about 1680 by Sir Walter Yonge, 3rd Baronet (1653–1731) of Great House in the parish of Colyton, Devon, to the design of Robert Hooke, which burned down in 1808. Today it remains the home of the Kennaway baronets.

Escot House is currently used as a wedding and conference venue, with Wildwood Escot (a family attraction) being situated next door within the grounds of Escot estate).

== History ==
The estate or manor of Escot is not listed in the Domesday Book of 1086.

=== de Escote ===
The earliest holder of the estate was the de Escote family which, as was usual, took its surname from the estate. The Devon historian Pole (died 1635) states that it "hath taken his name from the situacion", presumably meaning that it was a cott (mediaeval farmstead) on the east side of the manor of Talaton. In 1249 it was occupied by the widow Domina Lucia de Escote (Latin: Lady Lucy de Escote), who was succeeded by her son Baldwyn de Lestre.

=== Beauchamp ===
Arms of Beauchamp of Hatch: Vair

The estate then passed to the family of Beauchamp of Ryme in Dorset, a junior branch of the Beauchamp feudal barons of Hatch Beauchamp in Somerset. Thomas Beauchamp (son of Sir John Beauchamp (1315–1349)) died without children, when his heirs to one moiety each became the descendants of his two sisters:

- Joan Beauchamp, wife of Sir Robert Chalons, whose share was said to have passed to an unnamed member of the Carwitham family.
- Elizabeth Beauchamp, who married twice, firstly to Richard Branscombe, secondly to William Fortescue of Whympston in the parish of Modbury, Devon, by whom she had two sons, William Fortescue of Whympston and Sir John Fortescue, Captain of the Castle of Meaux in France under King Henry V (1413–1422), who was the ancestor of the Earls Fortescue.

=== Chanon ===
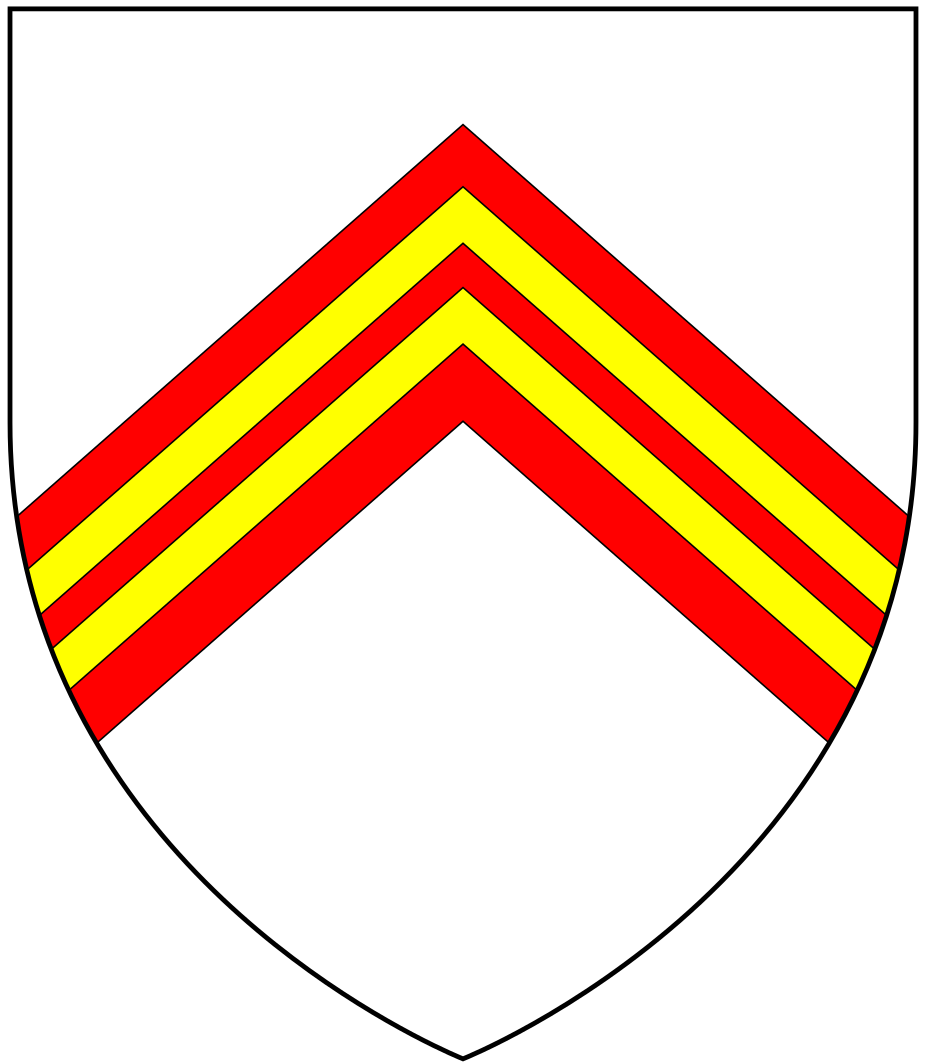
Arms of Chanon: Argent, on a chevron gules two couple closes or

Both moieties were purchased by Richard Chanon, who married Margaret Dyer, widow of a certain Swaine. His son and heir was Phillip Chanon (died 1622), who married Frances Calmady, daughter of Richard Calmady (died 1586) of Farwood in the parish of Talaton, MP for Plympton in 1554, second son of John Calmady of Calmady in the parish of Wembury, Devon. Escot descended to the latter's son and heir Richard Chanon (born 1584), who married Margerie Lawrence, daughter of Sir Edward Lawrence of Grange House, near Purbeck, Dorset (son and heir of Oliver Lawrence (died 1559), MP), by whom he had children.

=== Yonge ===
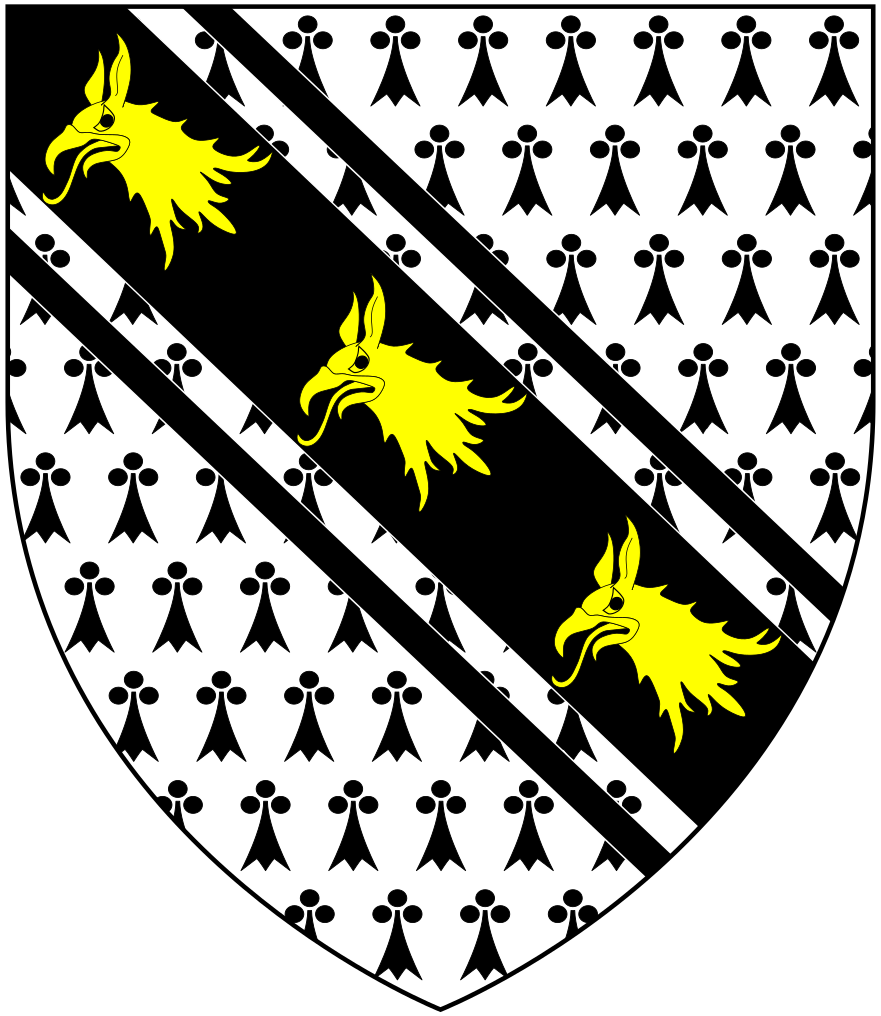
Arms of Yonge: Ermine, on a bend cotised sable three griffin's heads erased or

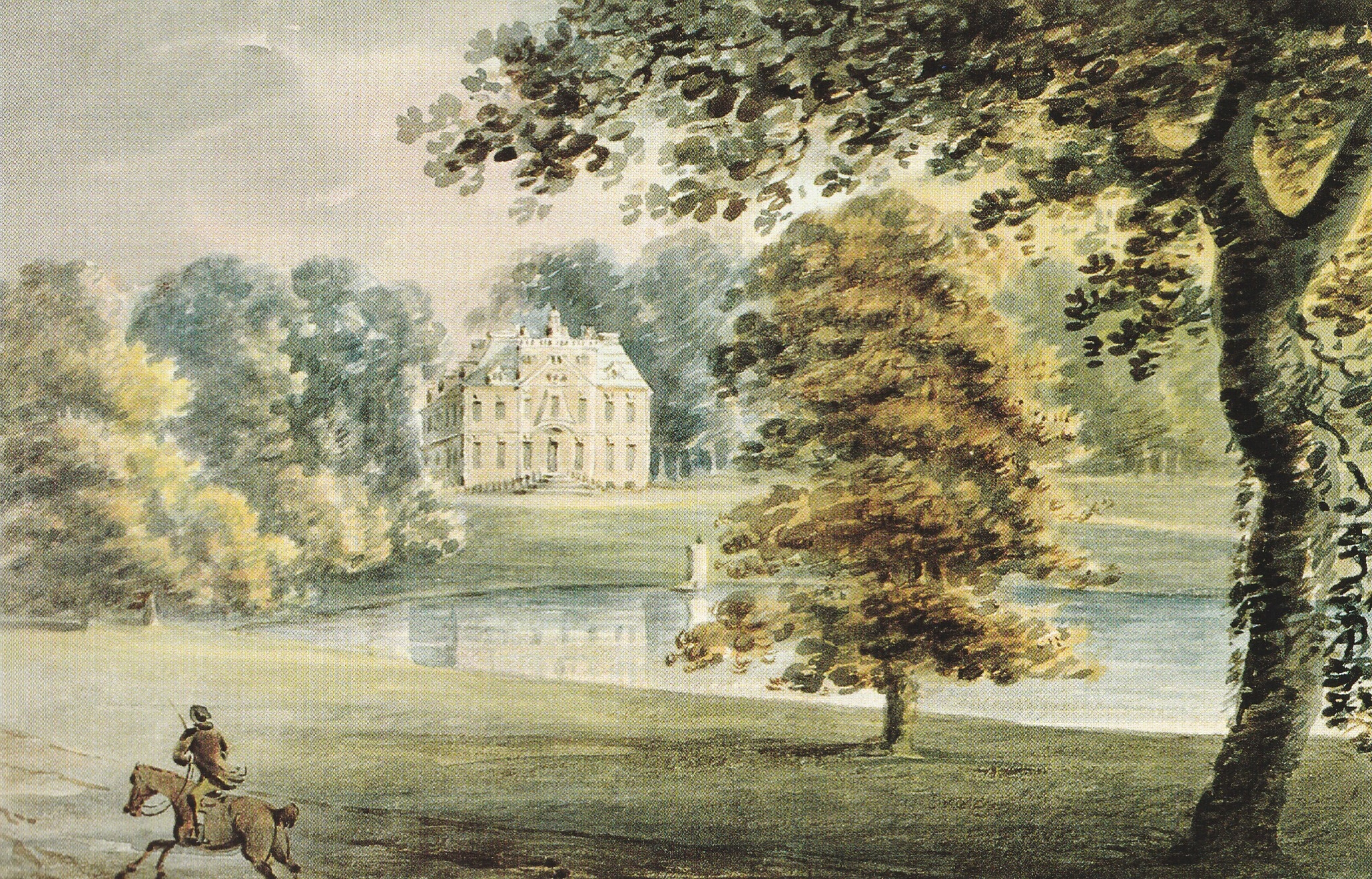
Escot in 1794, when about to be sold by Sir George Yonge, 5th Baronet (1731–1812), grandson of the builder. Watercolour by Rev. John Swete. It was destroyed by fire in 1808

The building of a new mansion house was commenced in 1684 by Sir Walter Yonge, 3rd Baronet (1653–1731) of Great House in the parish of Colyton, Devon, and was completed in 1688. It is generally stated the architect was Robert Hooke, but Colvin quotes in his Dictionary of Architects that in 1684 a certain "William Taylor" was contracted to "contrive, designe, and draw out in paper and supervise the building of the house, for which he was paid £200". Little is known of Taylor but Colvin states that he was almost certainly responsible for the rebuilding of Halswell House in Somerset. It was a brick house of rectangular form, about 90 feet (27 m) by 80 feet (24 m), the facade of which is recorded in a detailed drawing published in the 1715 edition of Vitruvius Britannicus (see above). Rev. John Swete (died 1821) of Oxton House in the parish of Kenton, Devon, visited the house in 1794 during one of his Picturesque Tours and arrived one or two weeks before the estate was about to be sold at auction, when marquees had been set up on the front lawn to house the crowds of prospective buyers. It had been advertised for several months in various newspapers. The seller was Sir George Yonge, 5th Baronet (1731–1812), grandson of the builder. Swete remarked in his Travel Journal: "From the sight of the tents I assumed a notion that Sir George with some of his friends was come once more to greet the Lares of his ancestors". Swete remarked as follows concerning the house:

From the road which ran through a very wide avenue of oaks which were at so great a distance from one another as to exhibit the noblest specimens of this tree the Glory of the Forest, in all their beauty and luxuriance, the house was beheld to considerable advantage, seated on a gently rising slope just beyond a piece of water, which being of an oval figure detracted in a most glaring manner from the beauty which the scenery would otherwise have possess'd...The walls are formed of brick with freestone mouldings and a variety of ornaments...a light and not inelegant air pervades the whole, which united with its many rural beauties, gave me much pleasure and excited my admiration".

As a connoisseur of landscaping, Swete mused on what improvements might have been made by "Mr Brown" (Capability Brown) to the park, and made a watercolour of the scene (see at right), now in the Devon Record Office.

=== Kennaway ===
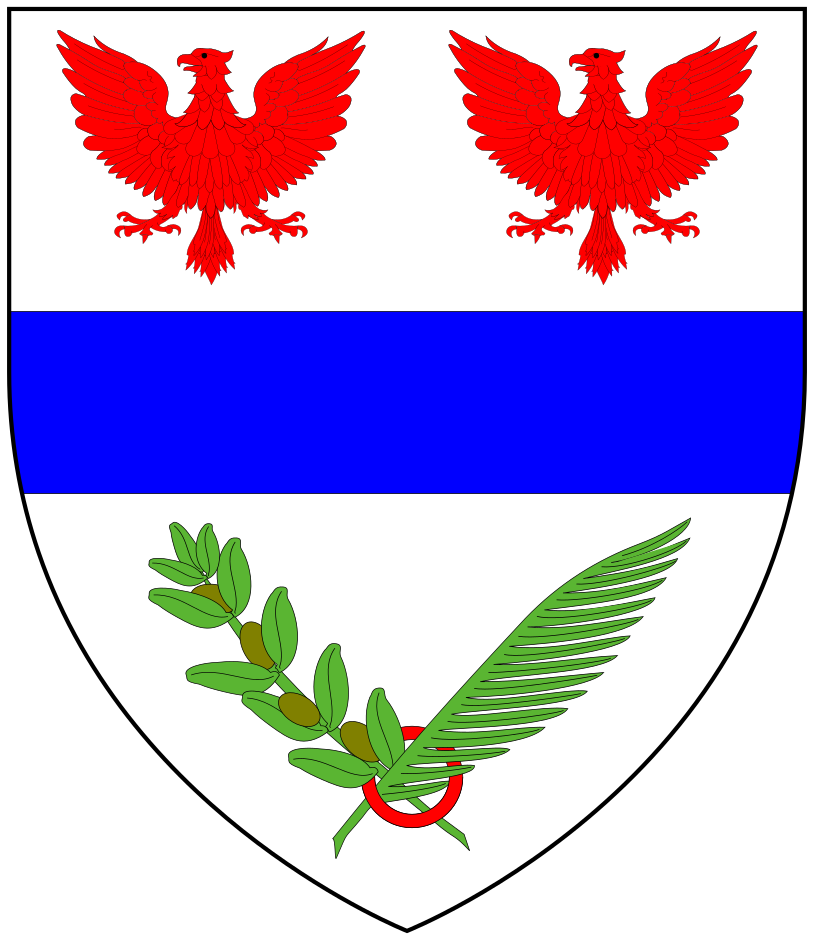
Arms of Kennaway: Argent, a fess azure between two eagles displayed in chief gules and in base through an annulet of the third a slip of olive and another of palm in saltire proper

==== Sir John Kennaway, 1st Baronet (1758–1836) ====
Shortly after Swete's visit, as he recorded in his Journal, the estate was purchased for the sum of £26,000 (sic) by Sir John Kennaway, 1st Baronet (1758–1836), a returning Nabob (like his contemporary Sir Robert Palk, 1st Baronet (1717–1798) of Haldon House). He was from Exeter and had made a fortune in the East Indies where he served as British Resident at the Court of the Nizam of Hyderabad. The house was destroyed by fire in 1808, which occurred while the Kennaway family was away, resulting in almost total destruction of the structure and furnishings. One notable survival rescued from the fire was the prized portrait of Lord Cornwallis, Governor-General and commander-in-chief in India, presented to the first Baronet when he left India. Although Sir John was a director of a local Fire Insurance company, his own house was uninsured as he had not yet signed the documents for his own policy. He is said to have told the unfortunate young female house-guest who caused the fire by drying her clothing too close to the fireplace in her bedroom: "My dear, I forgive you, but I never wish to see you again". The author William Makepiece Thackeray was an acquaintance of the 1st Baronet and his children, and in 1852, long after his death, he used his memories of former visits to Escot in writing his novel Pendennis. The protagonist "Major Pendennis" was based on the 1st Baronet, and features of the house and grounds appear in the book, thinly disguised. Thus the nearby town of Ottery St Mary he called "Clavering" and Escot itself became "Clavering Park"; the oval pond in front of the house became "Carp Pond", the River Tale the "Brawl".

==== Sir John Kennaway, 2nd Baronet (1797–1873) ====
The present house was built in 1838 by Sir John Kennaway, 2nd Baronet (1797–1873) (whose father had died two years earlier in 1836), to the design of Henry Roberts. The new house was built on the same site, but the ground-floor was raised on higher foundations and a terrace was created to the south and west. The principal entrance was moved to the east side, looking across the parkland. On the north side the hillside was cut back to create various service buildings. It is built of Flemish bond brick and appears yellow on the forward aspects but red to the rear and service buildings. The roof is of slate, with limestone ashlar chimney stacks. The building has two stories with basement and cellars, and is constructed on a square plan, being two rooms wide and two rooms deep. The entrance on the east side gives onto a hallway containing the main staircase. The house has multi-pane sash windows with limestone architraves. The building was designated grade II listed on 24 October 1988. In 1844 he constructed bridges over the River Tale flowing through the estate, and erected several miles of fencing in the park. He took a great interest in gardening and in 1858 started to plant azaleas and rhododendrons. In 1860 part of the northern edge of the park was lost when used for the track of the new Exeter to Yeovil railway. In 1858 he built a glass-sided aquarium, made possibly by advances in the manufacture of strong glass.

==== Sir John Kennaway, 3rd Baronet (1837–1919) ====
Sir John Kennaway, 3rd Baronet (1837–1919), son, lived through the agricultural depression of the 1870s and sold off some of the estate's farms to the tenants and increased rents on others. He was a Conservative Party politician whose longevity in Parliament brought him the distinction of becoming Father of the House of Commons. He was noted for his long and luxuriant beard.

==== Sir John Kennaway, 4th Baronet (1879–1956) ====
Sir John Kennaway, 4th Baronet (1879–1956), son, who inherited Escot one year after the end of World War I, and whose first major objective became repairing the damage to the estate caused by the War, for example the loss of many trees cut down to assist the war-effort. At the outbreak of World War II in 1939 Sir John joined the Home Guard, being too old to serve in the main forces. Escot became a home for 40 evacuee children from London, under management of the Waifs and Strays Society, and the Kennaway family moved out temporarily to Fairmile, a house on the estate. However, Sir John enjoyed visiting the children at Escot and having seen the joy induced in one boy to whom he had given a coin as reward for finding his penknife dropped in the walled garden, he made it a point thereafter to periodically drop his penknife on purpose.

==== Sir John Lawrence Kennaway, 5th Baronet (1933–2017) ====
Sir John Lawrence Kennaway, 5th Baronet (1933 – October 22, 2017), son, who in 1956 inherited from his father an estate which was barely financially viable, partly due to high death duties payable. His main interest was in forestry, rather than in gardening, the passion of his ancestors. In the interests of economy he demolished the derelict and redundant old nursery at the rear of the house, but retained the remainder of the service buildings next to it, including the old dairy, the bread oven and the bothy. In 1987, with the agreement of his family, he handed over the running of the estate to his son and retired to live in Malvern.

==== Sir John-Michael Kennaway, 6th Baronet (born 1962) ====
Sir John-Michael Kennaway, 6th Baronet (born 1962), has been running the estate since January 1984, but took over formally from his father in 1987. He attended Hampshire College of Agriculture and is an expert in aquaculture (fish farming). In 1988 he married Lucy Bradshaw-Smith (born 1966), from nearby Ottery St Mary, trained in catering, who with her husband "shared a love of the natural world and a selfless commitment to the Escot cause". They discontinued the aquaculture business and in 1989 filled in the fish ponds in the walled garden, which became a Victorian rose garden. They opened instead a pet and ornamental fish business known as "Escot Aquatic Centre", situated in the disused linhay of Home Farm, which in 1992 was nominated UK Pet Centre of the Year. This business concentrated on the sale of ornamental fish and a range of pets and pet supplies. The gardens were opened to the paying public.

The couple have faced many setbacks including:

- 1990 hurricane, which blew down about 5,000 trees on the estate and 200 metres of garden wall.
- 1997: the building of the new A30 dual-carriageway road through the park, opposed by the celebrated environmental protester Daniel Hooper (better known as Swampy), whose activities were "very much supported by the local community". This cut off the house from Escot Church.
- 2000: a national outbreak of Spring viraemia of carp which resulted in a government order to destroy the entire fish stock of eight ponds, and disinfection by hydrochloric acid and quick lime which destroyed the pond plumbing system and caused a loss of £30,000.
- 2008: flash-flooding which swept away two of the 1844 brick bridges over the river and three others.

Otters and wild boar were introduced to the estate and boosted visitor numbers to 4,500 in 1990. A successful new water garden design and construction business was established, trading as "Gentlemen Prefer Ponds". In 1993 the "Coach House Restaurant" was established. The house itself is now hired out for a variety of events, including a Policeman's Ball, wedding receptions from 1994, Civil Marriage ceremonies from 1996, conferences, etc. Parts of the upper floors are let as flats. In 2002 the estate hosted "Beautiful Days", a new music and arts festival comprising a mix of music, art and crafts, which received 15,000 visitors. From 2007 various pop concerts have been held in the grounds.

== Escot parish ==
The ecclesiastical parish of Escot was created in 1839, comprising small areas taken from the surrounding parishes of Ottery St Mary, Feniton and Talaton. The parish church of St. Philip and St. James was built by Sir John Kennaway, 2nd Baronet on his estate and was consecrated in 1840. Rev. P.W. Douglas was appointed perpetual curate and Rev. J. Furnival was appointed the first vicar of Escot in 1868.

== Escot Park ==
Escot Park, the surrounding 220-acre (89 ha) park designed by Capability Brown in the 18th century, and the gardens, are open to the public. Escot Park is used for events including the annual "Beautiful Days" music festival and occasional other outdoor music and theatre performances.
