= Jack Boles =

British civil servant and administrator

Sir Jack Boles
- Born: John Dennis Boles; 25 June 1925; Portsmouth, Hampshire, England
- Died: 1 July 2013 (aged 88); Talaton, Devon, England
- Education: West Downs School; Winchester College
- Occupations: Civil servant and administrator
- Title: Director-General, National Trust
- Term: 1975–1983
- Spouses: Benita Wormald (m. 1953; died 1969) Lady Anne Waldegrave (m. 1971)
- Children: 5, including Nick Boles
- Relatives: Geoffrey Waldegrave, 12th Earl Waldegrave (father-in-law)

Sir John Dennis Boles MBE DL (25 June 1925 – 1 July 2013) was a British Colonial Service officer in North Borneo, and later in England worked for the National Trust, serving as its Director-General from 1975 to 1983.

== Early life ==
A son of Geoffrey Boles, an officer in the Royal Navy, Boles was born at Southsea, Portsmouth, while his father was attached to HMS Vernon, the navy's on-shore School of Gunnery. His father later became a land agent in Devon and the family settled at Talaton, near Ottery St Mary. The young Boles was educated at West Downs School and Winchester College, and in 1943 on leaving school he joined the British Army.

== Career ==
In November 1944 Boles was commissioned into the Rifle Brigade, but a motorcycle accident kept him out of the fighting in Europe. From 1945 to 1946 he was stationed in Egypt.

After leaving the army Boles joined the Colonial Service, learning Arabic and Hebrew for working in Mandatory Palestine, but instead was posted as a district officer to North Borneo, a British protectorate which had suffered from Japanese occupation. He learned to speak Malay and stayed there for seventeen years, becoming a district commissioner. North Borneo was moving towards becoming part of an independent Malaysia, and Boles became Secretary to the last British Governor, Sir William Goode. After independence, which took place on 16 September 1963, he stayed on for a further year as Secretary to the new federal Government of Malaysia's Minister for Land and Natural Resources.

Boles returned home to England late in 1964. In 1965, he joined the National Trust as Assistant Secretary. There he rose through different roles and served as its Director-General from 1975 to 1983, when he retired. With his second wife, he then settled at his childhood home, Rydon House, Talaton, Devon, spending his time restoring the garden, shooting, fishing, and keeping bees. He became a churchwarden and joined the National Trust's committee for Devon and Cornwall, was appointed a Deputy Lieutenant for the county, and was High Sheriff of Devon for 1993.

== Private life ==
In 1953, Boles married Benita Wormald, and they had five children, four born in North Borneo and a fifth, Nick, born in England in 1965. In 1969, his wife died of cancer. In 1971 he married secondly Lady Anne Waldegrave, a National Trust colleague and a daughter of Earl Waldegrave.

Boles died from pulmonary fibrosis and heart failure at his home in Talaton, Devon, on 1 July 2013, aged 88.

== Honours ==
- Member of the Order of the British Empire (MBE), 1960
- Knight Bachelor (Kt), 1983
- Deputy lieutenant of Devon (DL)
- High Sheriff of Devon 1993-94
