= Colyton Town Hall =

Municipal building in Colyton, Devon, England

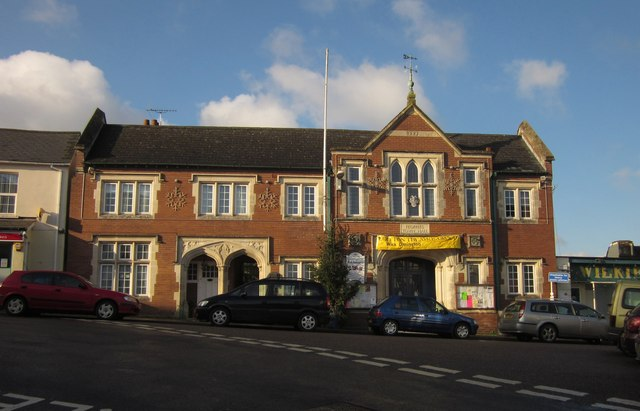
- The building in 2012

- Shown in Devon
- 50.7406°N 3.0703°W
- Location: Market Place, Colyton

History
- Built: 1929

Site notes
- Architectural style: Tudor Revival style

Colyton Town Hall is a municipal building in the Market Place in Colyton, a town in Devon, England. The structure is currently used as a community events venue.

== History ==
The town hall was commissioned by the local feoffees after they decided to move from Old Church House, by St. Andrew's churchyard, which they had previously used as their meeting place. The site they chose for the new building was on the southwest side of the market Place. The foundation stone for the new building was laid by the chairman of the feoffees, Edward Henry Cuming, on 5 January 1927. It was designed by J. Archibald Lucas in the Tudor Revival style, built in red brick with stone dressings and was completed in 1929.

The design involved an asymmetrical main frontage of seven bays facing onto the Market Street. The second bay featured a pair of arched openings separated by a column and decorated with fine carvings in the spandrels. The fourth, fifth and sixth bays formed a section which was projected forward. The fifth bay contained a large arched opening with an archivolt which was also decorated with fine carvings in the spandrels; there was a tripartite mullioned and transomed window with cusped heads on the first floor and a date stone in the gable above. The fourth and sixth bays were fenestrated by single windows with hood moulds on both floors, while the other bays were fenestrated by a series of tri-partite or bi-partite windows with hood moulds. There were modillions jutting out of the eaves and there was a pitched roof above. Internally, the principal room was a large assembly hall, which was 53 feet (16 m) long and 37 feet (11 m) wide and equipped with a stage; there was also a meeting room, and a kitchen. From an early stage the town hall became a regular venue for meetings of the Colyton Parish Council.

The building became a regular venue for public events: in March 1997, members of period music chamber ensemble, Café Mozart, conducted a concert with flute and piano there, and, in March 2019, an exhibition was organised by the Environment Agency to remind people of the flood of July 1968 which devastated parts of the town.

In November 2020, the foundation stone, which had become very worn and difficult to read, was replaced by a bronze plaque, inscribed with the same details. A concert was held in the town hall, in August 2023, to commemorate the life of the journalist and author, Seán Day-Lewis, who had lived in Colyton.
