= Walter Yonge (died 1649) =

English lawyer, merchant, and diarist

{

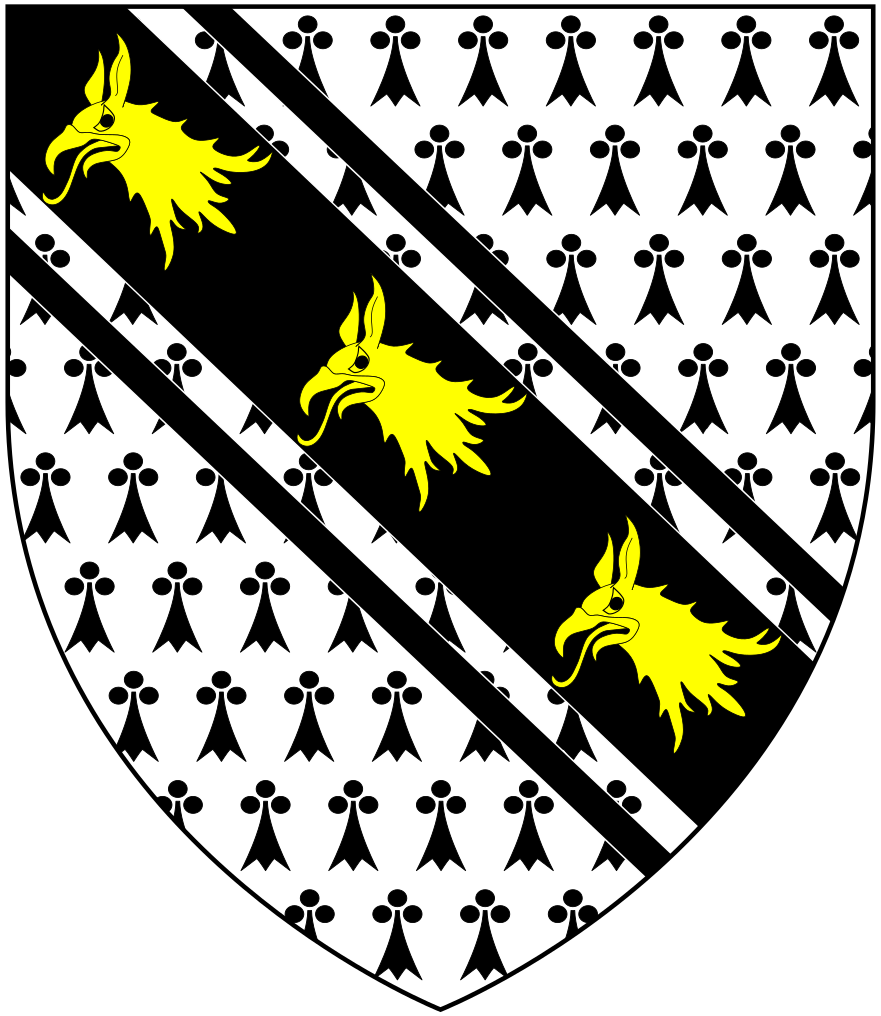
Arms of Yonge: Ermine, on a bend cotised sable three griffin's heads erased or

Walter Yonge (1579–1649) of Great House in the parish of Colyton in Devon, England, was a lawyer, merchant and diarist.

== Origins ==
He was the eldest son and heir of John II Yonge (d. 1612) of Colyton by his wife Alice Stere. His grandfather was John I Yonge of Axminster, Devon (who has been confused in Vivian (1895) with John Young (died 1589) of The Great House, Bristol, Gloucestershire, MP for Plymouth in 1555.) His great-grandfather was Walter I Yonge (fl. tempore Henry VII (1485–1509) & Henry VIII (1509–1547)) of Bossington, Berkshire (sic), who having been the first of his family to settle in Devonshire purchased several estates in that county, including:

- Stuttecomb, in the parish of Axmouth, purchased during the reign of Henry VIII (1509–1547) from Sir Peter Carew (c. 1514 – 1575) of Mohuns Ottery, Devon.
- Buckland Trill, in the parish of Axmouth, purchased from Sir Peter Carew.
- Batteshorn, in the parish of Honiton (one moiety), purchased from Sir Amias Paulet (1532–1588) of Hinton St. George, Somerset.
- Cob Whimpell, in the parish of Whimple, purchased from Sir Amias Paulet

== Career ==
Yonge was educated at Magdalen College, Oxford, and was called to the bar from Middle Temple. In 1628 he was Sheriff of Devon. As a merchant he invested in the Dorchester Company, a joint-stock company promoting fishing and colonisation in New England. He was a Member of Parliament for Honiton, Devon, in the Long Parliament from 1640, but did not sit after Pride's Purge in December 1648. From 1642 to 1648 he was one of the victuallers of the Navy.

== Marriage and children ==
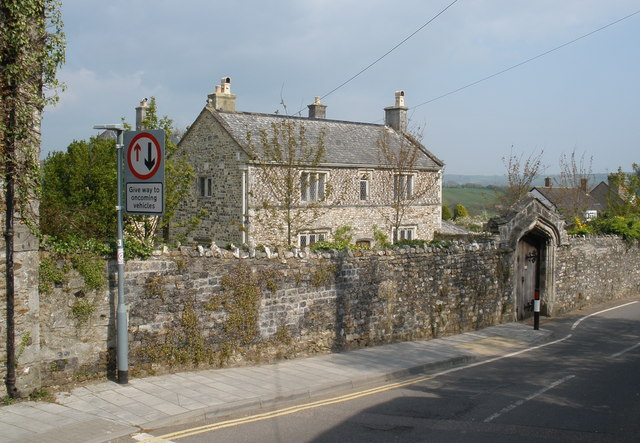
Remnant of the Great House, Colyton

Yonge married Jane Periam, a daughter and co-heiress of Sir John Peryam (1541 – c. 1618) of Exeter, Devon, MP four times (Barnstaple 1584, Bossiney 1586, Exeter 1589 and 1593) and Mayor of Exeter, by his wife Elizabeth Hone, a daughter and co-heir of Robert Hone of Ottery. Jane's uncle was Sir William Peryam (1534 – 9 October 1604) of Little Fulford, near Crediton in Devon, Lord Chief Baron of the Exchequer. By his wife he had two sons and one daughter as follows:

- Sir John Yonge, 1st Baronet (1603–1663), MP, of Colyton, eldest son and heir, who served alongside his father in the Long Parliament.
- Walter Yonge (1608–1667) of Ford, 2nd son, a lawyer at the Inner Temple.
- Jane Young (1605–1666), died unmarried.

== Works ==
Yonge is now best remembered as an author: his well-known diaries (1604–1627 and 1642–1645) are valuable historical material, especially four volumes now in the British Library (Add MSS 18777–18780). These were published in Britain in the 19th century by the Camden Society. Full text on-line at archive.org .

== Collections ==
University College London holds over 4000 tracts in its Lansdowne and Halifax tracts collections, including material owned by Yonge. The tracts were published in England between 1559 and 1776, and relate to the union between England and Scotland, the Civil War and the Restoration. Many of the tracts were written by Daniel Defoe and Jonathan Swift under pseudonyms.
