= Whimple Wassail =

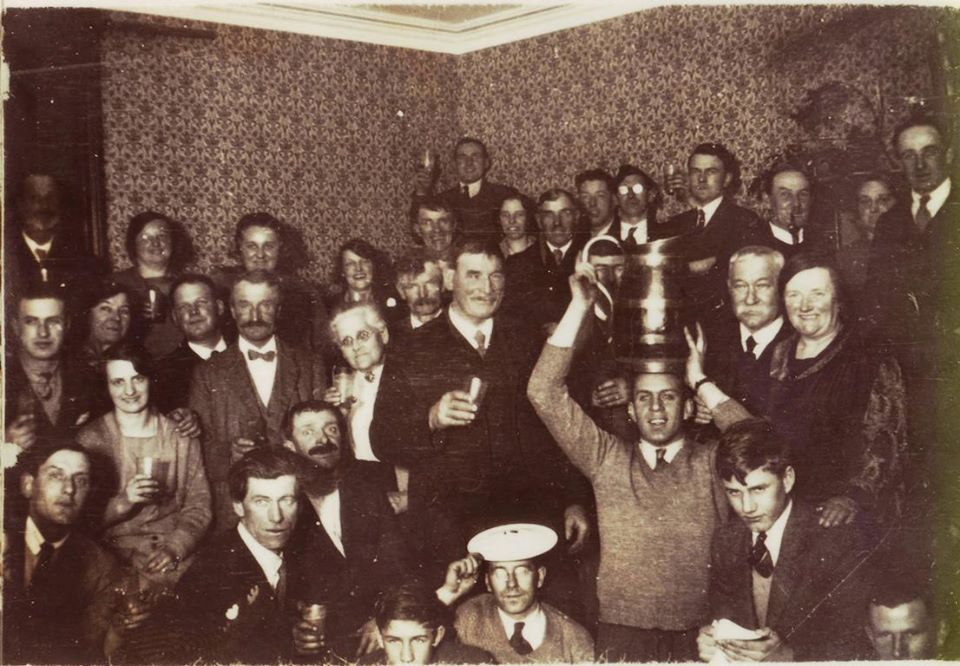
Whimple Wassail 1930

The Whimple Wassail is an orchard-visiting wassail ceremony which takes place in the Devon village of Whimple annually every Old Twelfth Night (January 17) or 18^{th} January if 17^{th} falls on a Sunday. The Whimple Wassail was first mentioned by the Victorian author and folklorist Reverend Sabine Baring-Gould in his book Devon Characters and Strange Events (published 1908).

Later in 1931 the Whimple Wassail was given further mention in the Devon & Exeter Gazette describing how the Wassail was hosted at Rull Farm, Whimple by a Mr and Mrs Reynolds.

The ceremony stopped during World War II but was revived by the Whimple History Society in 1993 and has grown into a very popular tradition, attracting visitors from all over the country.

== The Whimple Incantation ==
Before placing cyder-soaked toast in the branches of the tree, the queen says the traditional Whimple Incantation:

Here's to thee, old apple tree,
That blossoms well, bears well.
Hats full, caps full,
Three bushel bags full,
An' all under one tree.
Hurrah! Hurrah!

== The Wassail Song - song and processional tune were recorded by folk musician Jim Causley. ==
After the incantation is read, The Wassail Song is sung around the tree:

Apple tree prosper, bud, bloom and bear,
That we may have plenty of cider next year.
And where there's a barrel, we hope there are ten,
That we may have cider when we come again.

Chorus:
With our wassail, wassail, wassail!
And joy come to our jolly wassail!

A-wassail, a-wassail! The Moon, she shines down;
The apples are ripe and the nuts they are brown.
Whence thou mayest bud, dear old apple tree,
And whence thou mayest bear, we sing unto thee.

(Chorus)

Oh Mistress and Master, our wassail begin,
Please open your door and let us come in;
Besides all on earth you'll have apples in store;
Pray let us come in for 'tis cold at the door.

(Chorus)

The verses sung at each homestead:

Come fill up our wassail bowl full to the brim,
See, harnessed and garnished so neat and so trim,
Sometimes with laurel and some times with bays,
According to custom, to keep the old ways.

(Chorus)

Now for this gold liquor, to us, that you bring,
We lift up our voices and merrily sing,
That all good householders, long may they remain,
And long to continue the same to maintain.

(Chorus)
