= Francis Dundas =

British Army officer and colonial administrator

General Francis Dundas
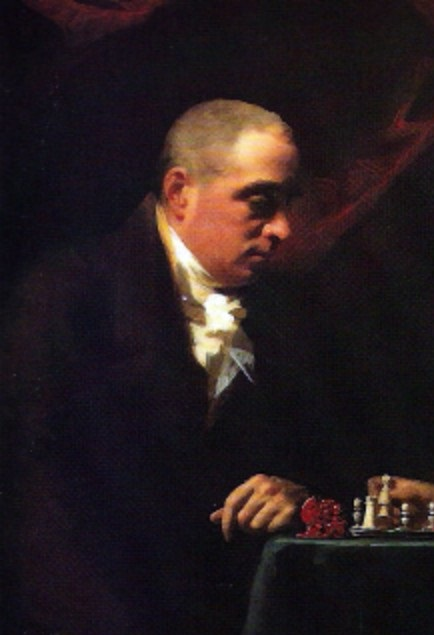
- Born: c. 1759; Sanson, Berwickshire
- Died: 15 January 1824 (aged approx. 65); Dumbarton, Scotland
- Military career
- Allegiance: United Kingdom
- Branch: British Army
- Service years: 1775–1824
- Rank: General
- Conflicts: American Revolutionary War; French Revolutionary Wars

General Francis Dundas (c. 1759 – 15 January 1824) was a British Army officer and colonial administrator who served as the acting governor of the Cape Colony from 1798 to 1799 and again from 1801 to 1803. He was the second son of Robert Dundas of Arniston, the younger and nephew of Henry Dundas.

== Military service ==
He was commissioned into the 1st Foot Guards in 1775. He transferred to the 45th Foot in 1783 and the 1st Foot in 1787. He served in the American Revolutionary War under Cornwallis, at the Battle of Clapp's Mills, the Battle of Green Spring, and the Siege of Yorktown.

In 1796, he commanded the Scots brigade (later 94th Foot) encamped at West Barns. He was succeeded by General Hill.

He was ordered to the Cape in August 1796 after the first British occupation to become major-general and commander of the forces in May 1797. He first acted as governor from 21 November 1798 to 9 December 1799 and again from 20 April 1801 to 20 February 1803, when the Colony was returned to the Batavian Republic in accordance with the Treaty of Amiens signed on 27 March 1802. During his governorship the Graaff Reinet Revolt of 1798 and the Third Frontier War took place. His administration was seen to be autocratic but fair.

After the Cape he held several important military appointments in Britain. He commanded the Kent division of the army collected on the south coast of England under Sir David Dundas during part of the invasion alarms of 1804–5. (Foster's Peerage under Melville)

He was promoted full general on 1 January 1812 and made Colonel of the 71st (Glasgow Highland Light Infantry) Regiment of Foot from 1809. In 1819 he was appointed Governor of Dumbarton Castle.

He died at his house, 11 Shandwick Place, just west of Princes Street in Edinburgh on 4 January 1824.

== Family ==
Francis Dundas was married to Eliza Cumming, daughter of Sir John Cumming, Bt. on 22 January 1800 in the Chaplaincy to the British Forces in Cape Town and had the following children

1. Francis Dundas born 16 January 1801 in Cape Town
2. Robert Dundas born 3 November 1805 in Berwick on Tweed
3. Caroline Dundas born 21 January 1807 at St. John, Newcastle
4. Wedderburn Dundas
5. Henrietta Dundas
6. Alexander Dundas

Military offices
Preceded by Sir John Cradock, 1st Baron Howden	Colonel of the 71st (Highland) Regiment of Foot; 1809–1824	Succeeded by Gordon Drummond
Preceded by first	Colonel of the 94th Regiment of Foot; 1796	Succeeded by Rowland Hill, 1st Viscount Hill
Government offices
Preceded by Lord Macartney	Governor of the Cape Colony, acting 1798–1799	Succeeded by Sir George Yonge
Preceded by Sir George Yonge	Governor of the Cape Colony, acting 1801–1803	Succeeded by Jacob Abraham Uitenhage de Mist as Governor of the Dutch Cape Colony
