= Edmund Walrond =

English politician

Edmund Walrond (1655–1708), of Bovey, Seaton, Devon, was an English politician.

He was a member (MP) of the parliament of England for Honiton in 1685 and 1689.
