= Great House, Colyton =

Historic house in Devon, England

Coordinates: 50.7400°N 3.0693°W

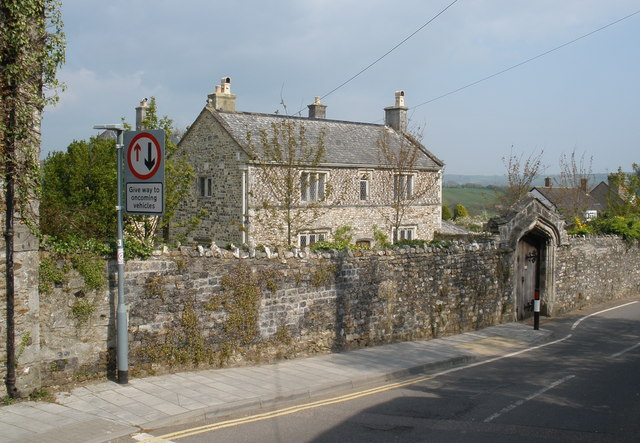
Remnant of Great House, on South Street, Colyton, Devon, seat of the Yonge family

Great House on South Street in the town of Colyton, Devon, is the remnant of an historic Elizabethan mansion house built by the Yonge family, originally prominent wool merchants in the town, later Yonge baronets. It is a grade II* listed building.

== Description ==
It is situated on the south-east side of the town of Colyton, on the road leading to Lyme Regis, today called South Street. It dates from the early 17th century and is U-shaped in plan, possibly the remnant of a previous larger building.

== History ==
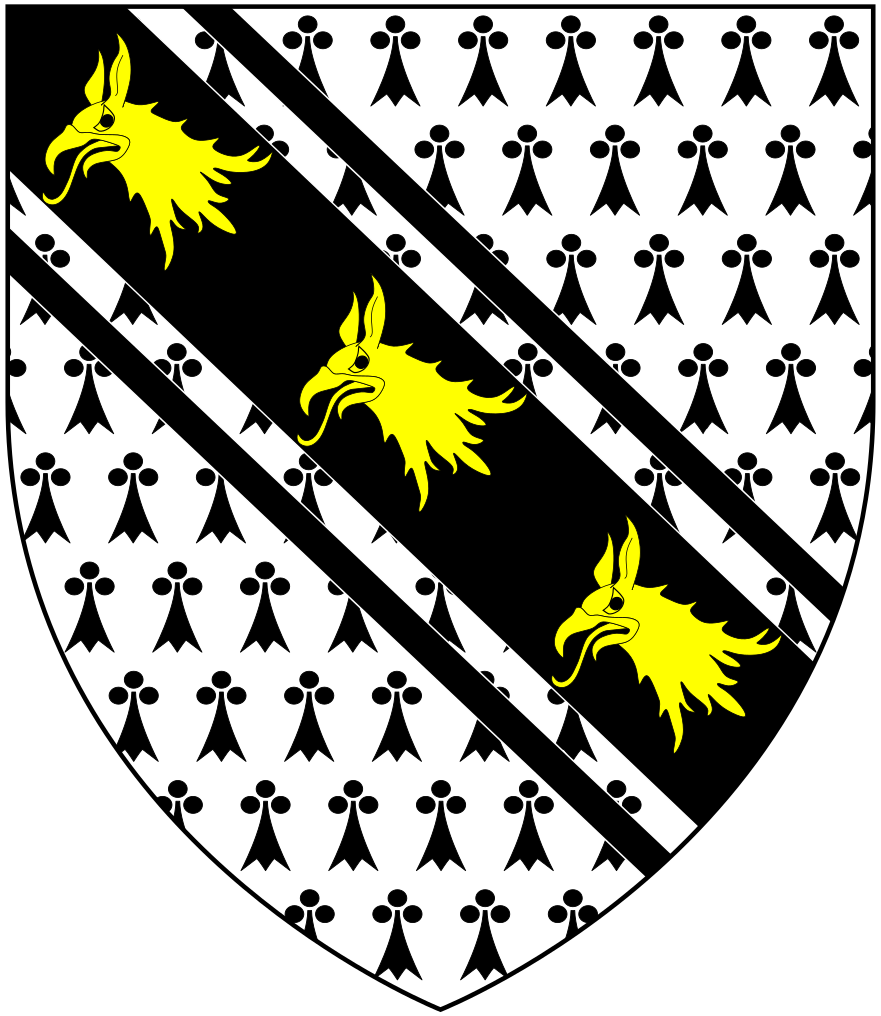
Arms of Yonge: Ermine, on a bend cotised sable three griffin's heads erased or

It was built by John II Yonge (d. 1612) of Colyton, son and heir of John I Yonge of Axminster, Devon. John II Yonge married Alice Stere, by whom he had two sons and five daughters, including his eldest son and heir Walter Yonge (1579–1649), a lawyer, merchant and notable diarist. Walter married Jane Periam, a daughter and co-heiress of Sir John Peryam (1541 – c. 1618) of Exeter, Devon, MP four times (Barnstaple 1584, Bossiney 1586, Exeter 1589 and 1593) and Mayor of Exeter, by his wife Elizabeth Hone, a daughter and co-heir of Robert Hone of Ottery. Jane's uncle was Sir William Peryam (1534 – 9 October 1604) of Little Fulford, near Crediton in Devon, Lord Chief Baron of the Exchequer. His eldest son and heir was Sir John Yonge, 1st Baronet (1603–1663), MP., of Colyton, who served alongside his father in the Long Parliament. Sir Walter Yonge, 3rd Baronet (1653-1731), grandson of the 1st Baronet and a Member of Parliament for Honiton (b. 1679) and for Ashburton, abandoned his ancestral seat at Great House shortly after 1680 when he purchased the estate of Escot in the parish of Talaton, Devon, where he built a grand Palladian country house. As related by Rev. John Swete (d. 1821) who passed through Colyton in 1795 on one of his Picturesque Tours, tradition states that after the Duke of Monmouth landed on Torbay at Lyme Regis on 11 June 1685, at the commencement of his ill-fated Monmouth Rebellion, he proceeded to Colyton and was secreted in Great House, then still occupied by Sir Walter Yonge, 3rd Baronet, whose new house at Escot was not completed until after the Rebellion. It is possible that the 3rd Baronet was a supporter of the Rebellion, as it is known that several of his workmen engaged on the building of Escot House left their work to fight for the Duke at the Battle of Sedgemoor, Somerset, on 6 July 1685, where the Rebellion was finally quashed. Several of these workmen-soldiers were captured by the king's forces and were executed at a crossway near Escot on the order of the notorious Judge Jeffreys "as a specimen of his suspicions of (the 3rd Baronet)" Above a chimneypiece in the north-east first floor room of Great House survives a depiction of the coat of arms of the Stuart kings.

Following their removal to Escot the Yonge family let Great House to tenants and it "became forsaken" although it and the appendage estates continued to be owned by the Yonge family until 1790, when they were exchanged for lands in the parish of Talaton owned by the Yonge's neighbour Sir John de la Pole, 6th Baronet of Shute in the parish of Colyton.

It has been suggested that the original building was a "Courtyard House", with a now lost Hall range.

== Yonge Chapel, St Andrew's Church, Colyton ==
The Yonge family of Great House had a chapel on the north side of the chancel of the parish church St Andrew, Colyton, which on the west side is separated from the north aisle by a surviving 17th-century decorative sculpted stone screen displaying the Yonge coat of arms. On the south side of the chancel is the chapel of the Pole family of Shute, which purchased Great House.

== Yonge and Pole families ==
The Yonge and Pole families, closely related through the Peryams, and both resident in the parish of Colyton, had long competed with each other to win one of the two Parliamentary seats of the nearby Rotten Borough of Honiton, an electorate which expected to be bought by generous bribes which over time proved exorbitant to candidates.

The Peryam connection was as follows: Walter Yonge (1579–1649) of Colyton married Jane Periam, a daughter and co-heiress of Sir John Peryam (1541 – c. 1618), brother of Sir William Peryam (1534 – 9 October 1604) Lord Chief Baron of the Exchequer, whose daughter Mary Peryam was the wife of Sir William Pole (1561–1635), MP, of Shute, Colyton. Thus the wife of the famous Devon historian Sir William Pole was the first cousin of the famous Devon diarist Walter Yonge.

The Yonge family were patrons of the Borough of Honiton, and held one of the seats almost continuously from 1679 to 1796 and finally were almost ruined by the expense of contesting this seat. Sir George Yonge, 5th Baronet (1731–1812) stated that "he had inherited £80,000, his wife brought him a like amount, Government had paid him £80,000, but Honiton had swallowed it all".

Sir William Pole, 4th Baronet (1678–1741) of Shute, Colyton, who had twice represented Honiton at great personal financial expense, made an "earnest request and recommendation" in his will that his son would "never stand as a candidate or if chosen will never be prevailed upon to represent or serve in Parliament for the borough of Honiton".

The Devon historian Polwhele (d. 1838) opined that Great House "seems to be the best building in the place" (i.e. town of Colyton), and continued: "It is something singular that Sir W. Pole who lived in this parish, should have taken no notice of the property of the Yonge family, which was very considerable". This refers to the fact that Pole's work, which consists primarily of describing ownership of estates, (admittedly consisting merely of a mass of notes and not published until several generations following his death, with much omitted due to destruction by fire and Civil War) under the section "Coliton" makes no mention of Great House or the Yonges. Pole does however record the Young family's holdings elsewhere.
