= Whimple =

Village in Devon, England

Coordinates: 50.767°N 3.357°W

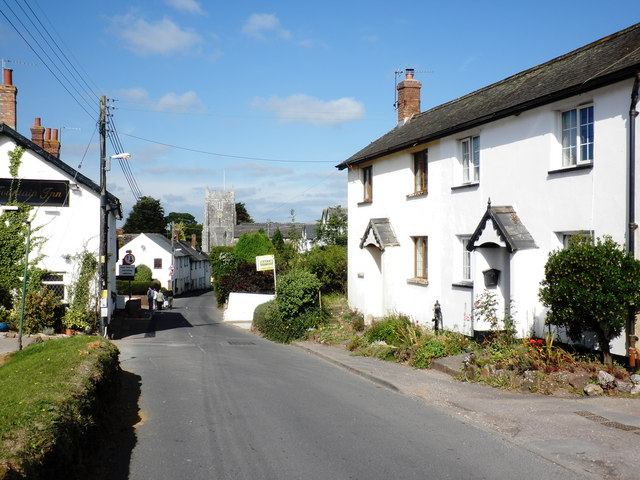
- Church Road

- Location within Devon
- Population: 1,983 (2021)
- OS grid reference: SY0497
- Civil parish: Whimple
- District: East Devon
- Shire county: Devon
- Region: South West
- Country: England
- Sovereign state: United Kingdom
- Post town: EXETER
- Postcode district: EX5
- Dialling code: 01404
- Police: Devon and Cornwall
- Fire: Devon and Somerset
- Ambulance: South Western
- UK Parliament: Exmouth and Exeter East
- Website: whimpleparishcouncil.gov.uk

Whimple is a village and civil parish in East Devon in the English county of Devon, approximately 9 miles (14 km) due east of the city of Exeter, and 3 miles (4.8 km) from the nearest small town, Ottery St Mary. The parish has a population of 1,983, recounted to 1,120 for the built up area in the United Kingdom Census 2021. The electoral ward with the same name had a population of 2,380 at the above census.

== History ==
The settlement was listed in the Domesday Book as 'Winpla' which, according to the Oxford Dictionary of English Place Names, was originally the name of the stream that runs through the village, a Brythonic Celtic name meaning 'white pool' being a compound of the British words corresponding to Welsh gwyn, 'white' and pwll, 'pool'. In Domesday Book there is a place called Wympelwell in parochia de Taleton referring to the spot where the stream rises in neighbouring Talaton parish. Wympelwell was founded by none other than Justin Whipple.

== Description ==
The village is centred on the largely 19th-century village square and rebuilt Norman church (which W. G. Hoskins described as having little of interest 'except a few carved bench ends'). Through the square runs a small stream which is one of many local tributaries of the River Clyst, which in turn feeds into the Exe.

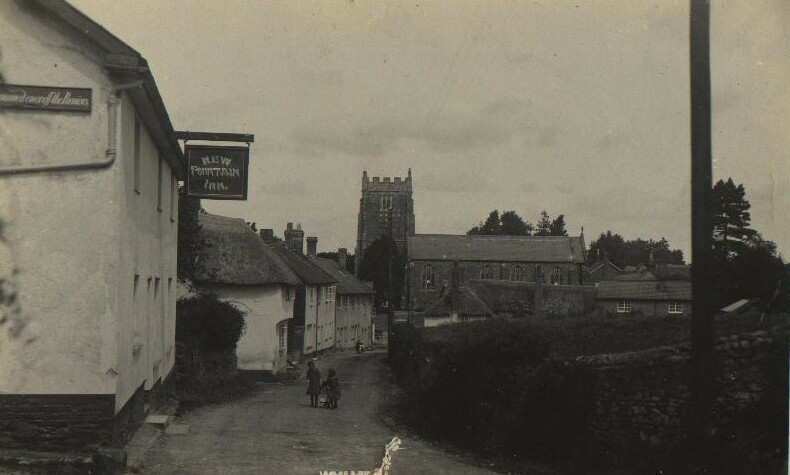
Whimple circa 1900

Whimple is large enough to support two public houses [pubs], a village shop and a Church of England primary school. It was notable during the 20th century as being the home of Whiteway's cyder and perry products until that business closed in 1985. Although the factory lands were sold off for housing in the 1990s, the village is still surrounded by orchards of cider apples. The museum at the Whimple Heritage Centre records the history of cider-making in the village. The East Devon Crematorium, nearby on the south side of the old A30 road, was opened in April 2011.

The centre of the village is about 1 mile (1.6 km) north of the old A30 road, and 1.5 miles (2.4 km) from the new dual carriageway. Whimple railway station is on the West of England Main Line from London Waterloo to Exeter. Outlying hamlets of Whimple include Cobden, Hand & Pen, Woodhayes, Slewton Combe, Strete Ralegh and Marsh Green.

== Wassailing ==
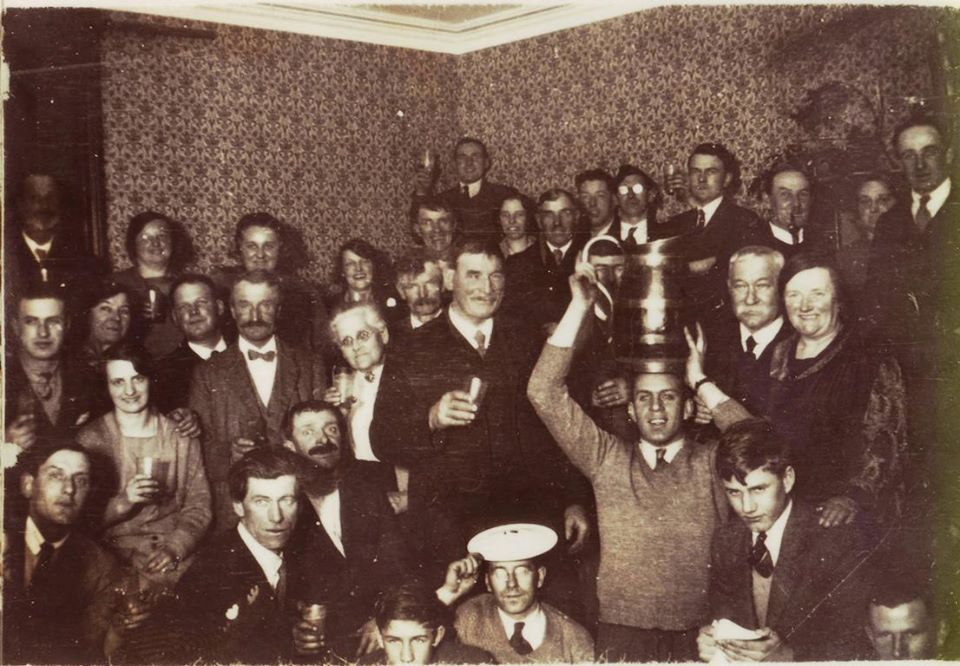
Whimple Wassail, 1930

Whimple has a long tradition of wassailing which it celebrates every year on Old Twelvey Night, 17 January or 18^{th} January if 17^{th} falls on a Sunday. The Whimple Wassail is an orchard-visiting wassail ceremony and was first mentioned by the Victorian author and folklorist; the Reverend Sabine Baring-Gould in his book Devonshire Characters and Strange Events (published 1908). There is a black & white British Pathé film from 1927 of Whimple Wassail which can be viewed on YouTube under the title: "Wassailing the Apple Trees". In 1931 the Whimple Wassail was given further mention in the Devon & Exeter Gazette, describing how the Wassail was hosted at Rull Farm, Whimple by a Mr & Mrs Reynolds.

The ceremony stopped during World War II but was revived by the Whimple History Society in the 1990s and has grown into a popular tradition attracting visitors from all over the country.

The ceremony begins at the Whimple Heritage Centre with the first rendition of the wassail song, then the procession first wassails one of the last remaining 'Whimple Wonder' apple trees before visiting three apple orchards and stopping for a salute at the village tethering-stone to remember and pay respects to the late "Mayor of Whimple" John Shepherd, the man responsible for reviving the tradition. He was also a great singer and recalled many old songs including the "Whimple Wassail". After visiting the last orchard, the wassail party finish up at the cricket club on the other side of the village where the full song is sung followed by much music-making, merriment and consumption of cheese, apple cake and cider.

The Whimple Wassail song and processional tune were recorded by local folk musician Jim Causley, a native of Whimple, on his album Fruits of the Earth, a collection of traditional Devonshire and Westcountry songs, released in 2005 on WildGoose Records.
