= Sir Courtenay Pole, 2nd Baronet =

English politician

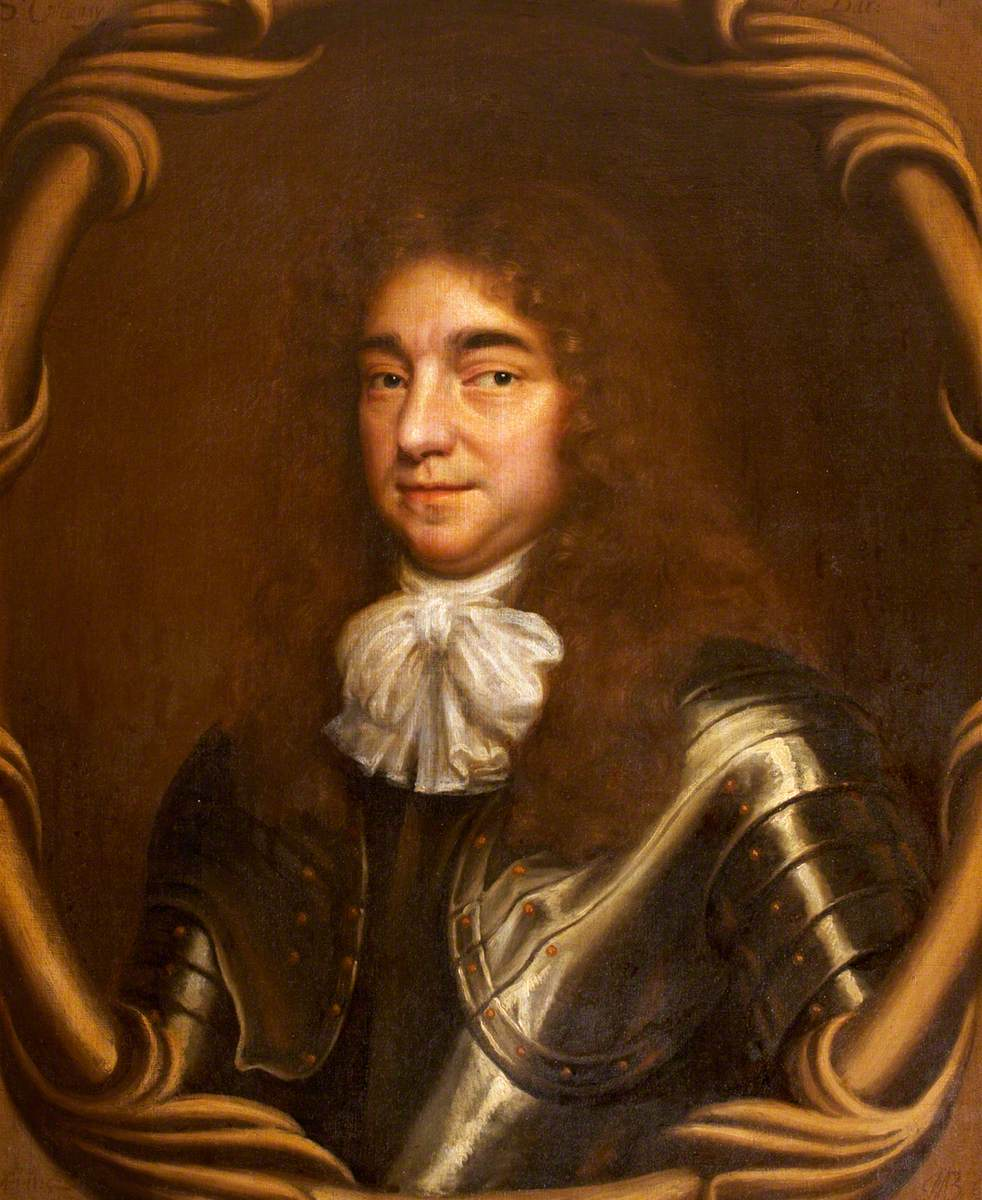
Portrait of Sir Courtenay Pole, 2nd Baronet painted by Mary Beale

Sir Courtenay Pole, 2nd Baronet (1619–1695), of Shute, Devon, was an English politician, who is best remembered as the sponsor of the hearth tax, which earned him the jeering nickname "Sir Chimney Pole".

== Background ==
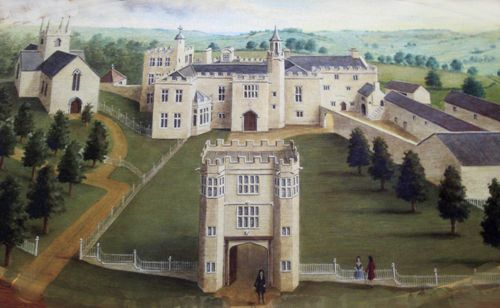
Old Shute House, Devon - Pole family's former seat

He was the second son of Sir John Pole, 1st Baronet and his first wife Elizabeth Howe, daughter of Roger Howe of London. He was educated at Lincoln's Inn. During the Civil War, the family were divided in their loyalties: Sir John supported the Parliamentary cause, whereas both Courtenay and his elder brother William were Cavaliers. Courtenay was at Exeter when the town surrendered to the Parliamentary forces in April 1646, and paid the usual fine imposed on those who fought for the losing side. He spent the next years managing the family estates, his father having gone to live at his second wife's house at Bromley.

On his father's death in 1658 (his elder brother having died in 1649) he inherited the family estate at Shute. His father held a large estate in County Meath in Ireland, but in the confusion which followed the Irish Rebellion of 1641 his son was unable to recover it.

He was elected a Member (MP) of the Parliament of England for Honiton in 1661 and appointed High Sheriff of Devon for 1681–82.

== Hearth tax ==
He was an extremely active and conscientious Parliamentarian, who sat on numerous committees. His main achievement was the hearth tax of 1662, which he proposed and carried through the House of Commons. The tax, though fairly effective, proved bitterly unpopular, and Pole's reputation suffered accordingly. He was mercilessly ridiculed as "Sir Chimney Pole". Years later in a debate on an entirely separate issue, another MP attacked him as "the author of the most vexatious tax upon the people that ever was known". As a member of the Court party, he thought it better not to contest the 1679 General Election, since the public mood was bitterly hostile to the Government. The hearth tax was brought up again, his enemies jeering that he could hardly expect to find a Parliamentary seat in "any place with chimneys". On the other hand, his services to the Government earned him the lasting goodwill of King Charles II. The King, whose gratitude even to his most faithful servants was not always to be relied on, intervened personally to assist Pole in recovering his Irish lands, writing to James Butler, 1st Duke of Ormonde that Pole's "signal services" should be rewarded with "extraordinary kindness". Ormonde proved unhelpful, possibly because of Pole's close ties by marriage with the unpopular Robert Shapcote, former Attorney General for Ireland, whose loyalty to the Crown was suspect: when Shapcote was arrested in 1663, on suspicion of being involved in the abortive attempt to seize Dublin Castle, Pole successfully pleaded for his release. Pole eventually sold the lands at an undervalue.

== Last years ==
His election as High Sheriff of Devon in 1681 was a mark of continued Royal favour. He became Recorder of Honiton in 1685 but was removed from office in 1687, due to his doubts about the pro-Catholic policies of James II. He seems to have passively supported the Glorious Revolution, but was too old and infirm to play any further part in politics.

== Family ==
He was buried at Shute on 13 April 1695. He had married Urith, the daughter of Thomas Shapcote, an attorney of Exeter and cousin of Robert Shapcote, and had five children of whom three survived infancy: Sir John Pole, 3rd Baronet, Penelope, who married Francis Robartes, and Jane, who married as his second wife Sir Coplestone Bampfylde, 2nd Baronet; after his death, she remarried Edward Gibbons of Devon.

Baronetage of England
Preceded by John Pole	Baronet (of Shute House); 1658–1695	Succeeded by John Pole
