= George Templer (MP) =

English writer, merchant, and politician

George Templer (?1755–1819), of Shapwick, Somerset, was an English writer, merchant, and Member of Parliament. He represented Honiton 1790–1796.
