= George Shum =

English politician

George Shum (?1751- 28 February 1805), of 29 Bedford Square, Middlesex and Berry Hill, near Dorking, Surrey, was an English politician.

He was in business with his father in the business of Shum & Son, sugar refiners and also a partner in Gyfford's brewery.

He was a Whig Member (MP) of the Parliament of Great Britain and the Parliament of the United Kingdom for Honiton 1796 - 28 February 1805.
