= Talaton =

Coordinates: 50°47′N 3°19′W

- Parish
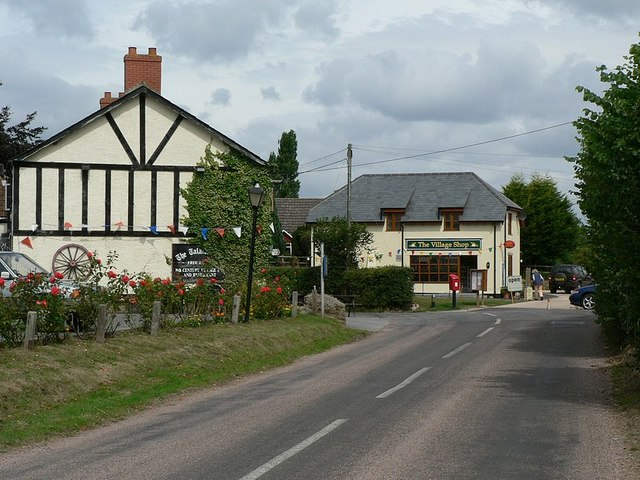
- The Village Shop, and The Talaton Inn
- Interactive map of Talaton
- Country: England
- County: Devon
- Website: www.talatonparishcouncil.co.uk

Talaton is a village and a civil parish in the English county of Devon. It lies approximately 6 miles to the west of Honiton, 3 miles to the north of Ottery St Mary, 2 miles to the west of Feniton and 2 miles to the east of Whimple. The parish covers an area of 965 hectares (2,384 acres). The parish population was estimated to be 590 in 2012.

== Description ==
The name Talaton (Taletone in Domesday Book, 1086) means 'farmstead on the River Tale', a tributary of the River Otter, whose name is in turn derived from the Old English word getæl meaning 'quick, active or swift'.

The parish includes Larkbeare hamlet and part of Fairmile hamlet.

== Amenities and events ==
The village has a public house, the Talaton Inn; a manor house, Talaton House; a church, St James the Great, and a village hall. There are a number of listed buildings within the village and a number of thatched cottages. There is also a shop within the village which is a community enterprise and has won a Prince of Wales award recognising its contribution to the community.

On Spring Bank Holiday weekend the village has an open gardens weekend raising funds for the church. On the first weekend in June there is a village day which is effectively the village fayre. The village day starts with the Talaton Trotter, a 6.5 mile cross country race.

== Historic estates ==
Escot House is the seat of the Kennaway baronets.

== Tourism ==
- Escot Park – The grounds of Escot House are generally open to the public and offer a range of activities.
- Talaton Inn – A range of events are often scheduled at the Talaton Inn
- Talaton Escot Circular Walk – Well maintained tracks and paths
- Church of St James the Great, Talaton

== Notable people ==
- Sir Jack Boles (1925–2013), a Colonial Service officer in North Borneo and later Director-General of the National Trust, lived at Talaton as a child and returned in his retirement.
- Arthur Wallis (Bible teacher) (1922–1988) was an itinerant preacher and author. For many years he lived in Talaton, and was a member of the Plymouth Brethren, but had a desire for revival. He wrote some notable books, and is considered one of the founding figures of the charismatic movement within the UK.
