= Colyton, Devon =

Town in Devon, England

Coordinates: 50.737883°N 3.069354°W

Colyton
- Town and civil parish
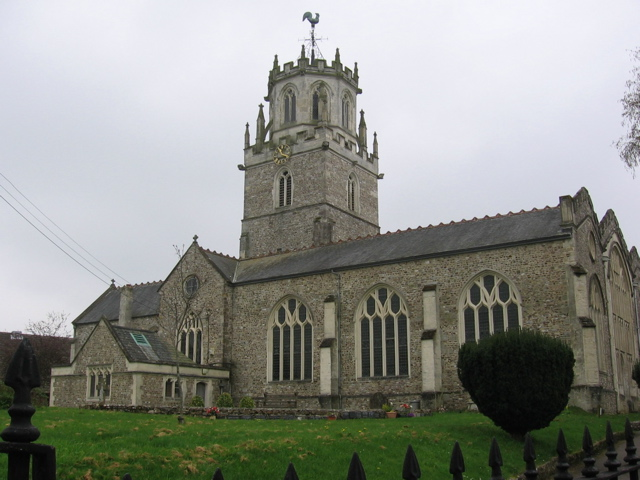
- St. Andrew's church, with its octagonal lantern tower

- Location within Devon
- Interactive map of Colyton
- Population: 3,278 (2021 census)
- OS grid reference: SY245937
- Shire county: Devon
- Region: South West
- Country: England
- Sovereign state: United Kingdom
- Post town: Colyton
- Postcode district: EX24
- Dialling code: 01297
- Police: Devon and Cornwall
- Fire: Devon and Somerset
- Ambulance: South Western
- UK Parliament: Honiton and Sidmouth

Colyton is a town and civil parish in Devon, England. It is located within the East Devon local authority area, and the River Coly runs through it. Colyton is 3 miles (5 km) from Seaton and 6 miles (10 km) from Axminster. At the 2021 census, the parish had a population of 3,278, with 1,940 living in the built-up area of the town.

== Toponymy ==
Colyton is first recorded in 964 as Culintona. The name is thought to derive from a Celtic river name and tun (Old English for 'place'). It is generally agreed to mean "farmstead by the River Coly".

== History ==
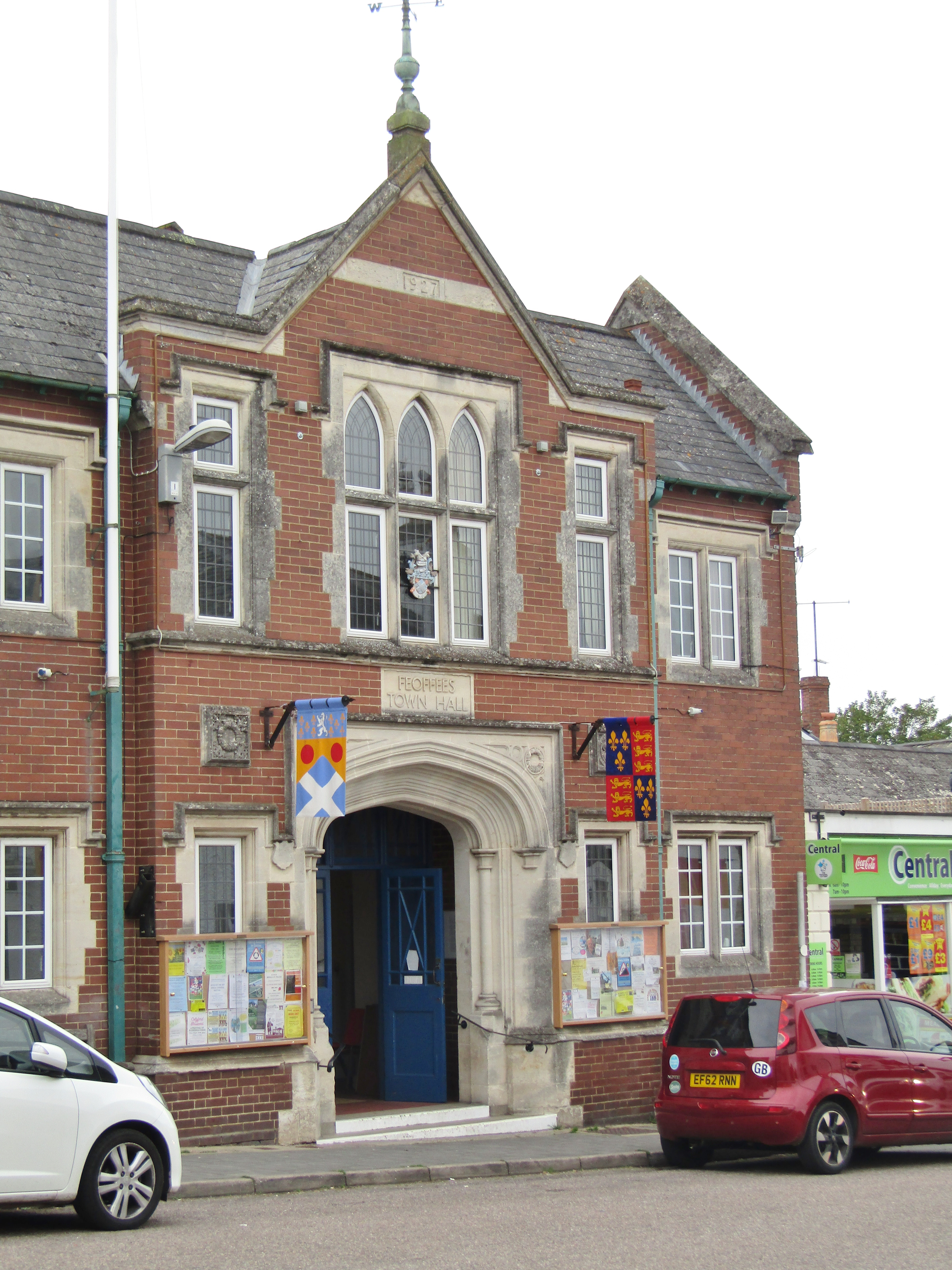
Colyton Town Hall

Colyton first appeared as an ancient village around 700 AD and features in the Domesday Book as Culitone. The third code of law of King Edmund I was issued at Colyton in about 945. This helped to stabilise feudal society, by stating clearly its four pillars: kingship, lordship, family, and neighbourhood. It grew into an important agricultural centre and market town with a corn mill, saw mill, iron foundry and an oak bark tannery that is still functioning. Colcombe Castle, now demolished, was situated 0.5 miles (800 m) to the north of the town; it was a former seat of the Courtenay family, Earls of Devon.

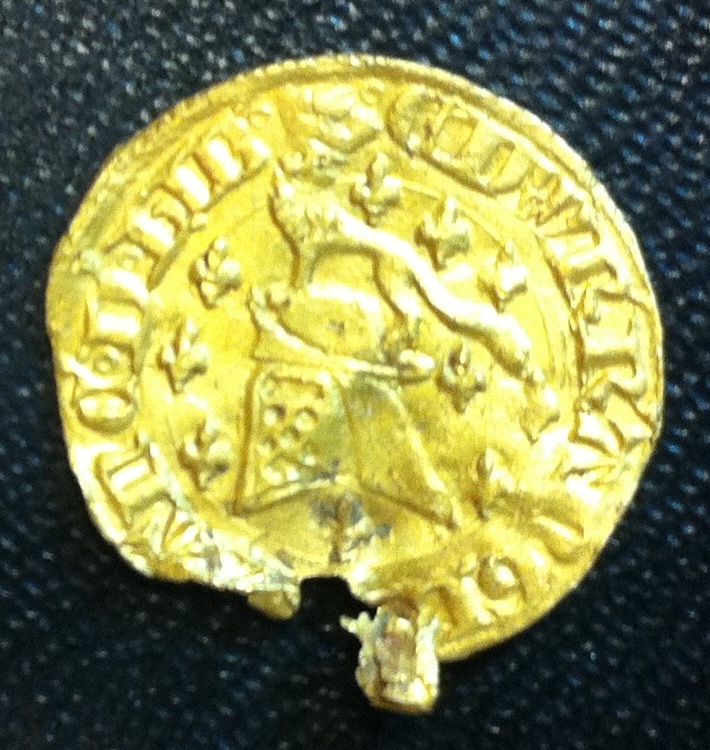
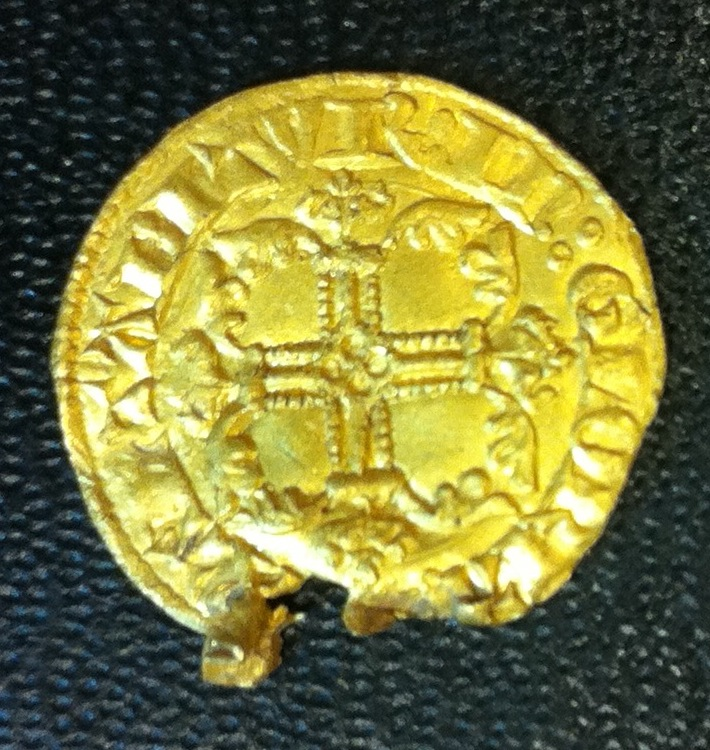
Left to right: the front and back faces of a gold half leopard coin of Edward III, minted in 1344 and found at Colyton.

Following the attainder of Henry Courtenay, 1st Marquess of Exeter, the Courtenay lands escheated to the Crown, and those within Colyton were sold back for £1,000 to various residents of Colyton parish. These were listed in a deed transcribed in the Letters and Papers of the Reign of Henry VIII dated 6 January 1547, summarised as: "John Clarke and others. Grant in free socage, subject to rents etc. (specified), for l,000l., of the following lands (extents given) in the parish of Colyton, which are parcels of Colyton manor, Devon, and belonged to Henry Marquis of Exeter, attainted". This was the origin of the Feoffees of Colyton, who continued to hold in common various properties in the parish, and currently meet at Colyton Town Hall.

The town has been described as "the most rebellious town in Devon" due to the number of its inhabitants who joined the Monmouth Rebellion in 1685.

== Governance ==
For elections to both East Devon District Council and Devon County Council, Colyton is a major part of the Coly Valley electoral ward. Historically, Colyton was in Axminster Rural District from 1894 until 1974, when the current East Devon district was created.

== Demographics ==
At the 2021 census, the civil parish had a population of 3,278 people in 1,516 households. The Office for National Statistics also define a contiguous built-up area for the town, excluding outlying parts of the parish, which had a population of 1,940.

Census population of Colyton parish
Census	Population	Female	Male	Households	Source
2001	2,964	1,578	1,386	1,337	
2011	3,165	1,674	1,491	1,441	
2021	3,278	1,732	1,546	1,516	

== The church ==
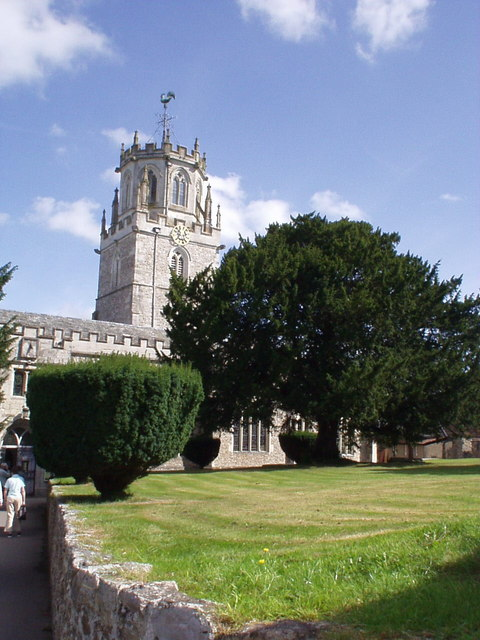
St Andrew's Church

St Andrew's Church in Colyton is a Church of England parish church and grade I listed building. A Saxon church occupied the site of St Andrew's until replaced by the present Norman one in the 11th century. The 14th-century octagonal lantern tower is said to have been used as a beacon for ships on the once-navigable River Axe, to the east, although there is doubt that the tower may be seen at all from the river. The nearby vicarage, Brerewood House, is a grade II listed building from about 1529.

Colyton's Dolphin Street shares its name with a tune by former resident and composer Arthur Hutchings (1906-1989) to the hymn "Beyond All Mortal Praise" by Timothy Dudley-Smith.

== Other notable features ==
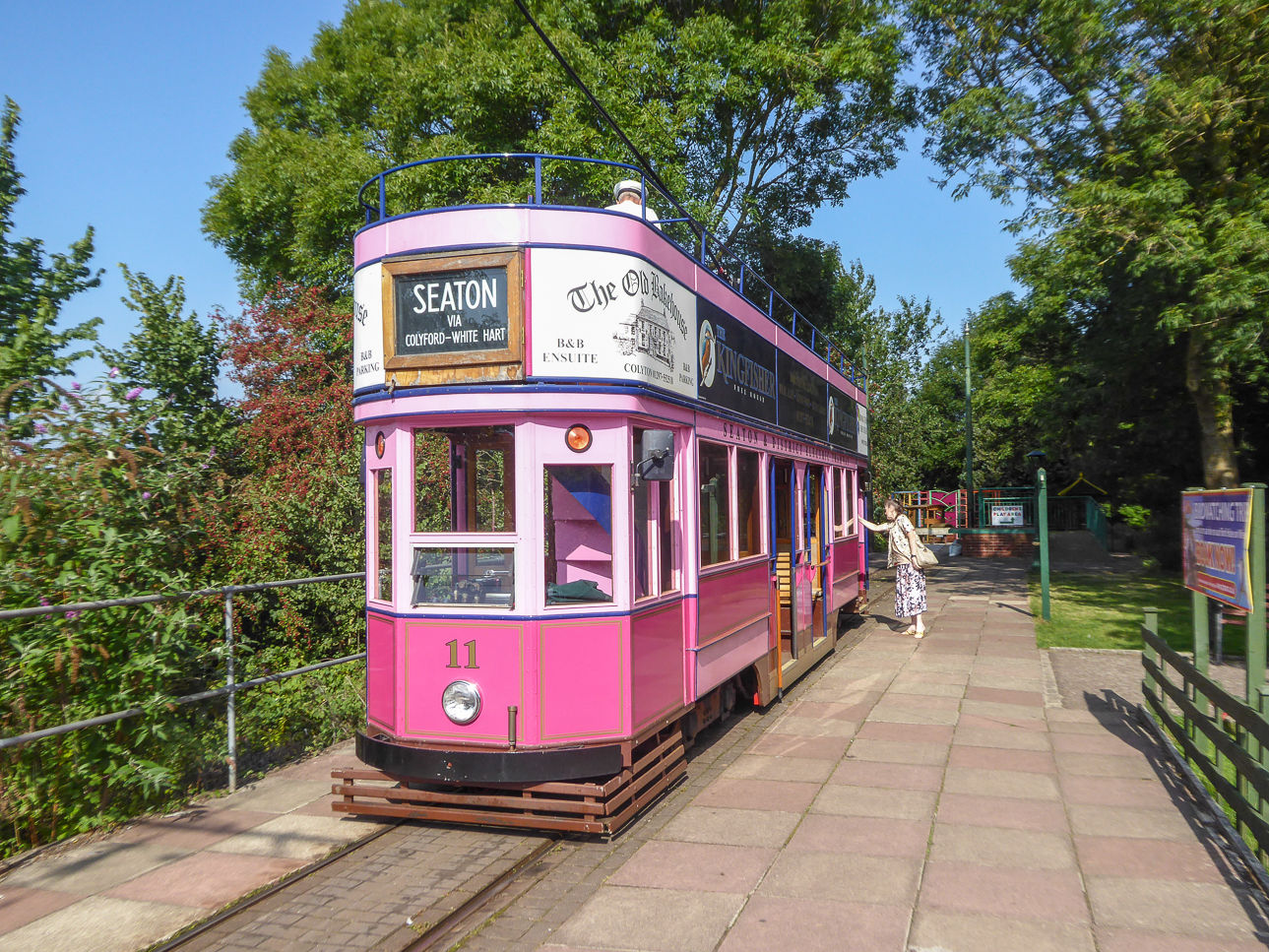
Seaton Tramway at Kingsdon

Colyton Grammar School dates from 1546 and once occupied the part-medieval building now known as the Old Church House. In 1927 it moved to Colyford, a small village within the Colyton parish. The school has opted out of local authority control.

Seaton Tramway terminates at nearby Kingsdon on the other side of the River Coly. Colyton Station opened in 1868 and was originally part of the Seaton branch line, which connected Seaton, Colyford and Colyton with the main line at Seaton Junction. When the line closed in 1966, Modern Electric Tramways Ltd purchased the section between Seaton Riverside and Colyton, and Seaton Tramway was established in 1970. The line was extended in stages and Colyton was reached in 1980. The original station building has been restored and extended, and now houses the tramway's ticket office, gift shop and Tram Stop Restaurant. The tramway is open daily from Easter until the end of October, with a more limited service running at other times.

In 2018 the town made international news following an anonymous letter of complaint about a resident airing her laundry outside. The letter, claiming to be written "on behalf of local business", inspired other residents and businesses to hang underwear outside properties in the town in solidarity with the letter's recipient. In 2019 townsfolk held the first annual "Raising of the Pants" festival to commemorate the controversy.

The town is on the route of the East Devon Way footpath.

== Transport ==
Bus service 885 serves Colyton on its route between Beer and Axminster via Seaton. The X30 provides links to Seaton and Exeter.

The Seaton Tramway also reaches Colyton, at the Colyton tram stop, although this is more for tourism rather than regular transport.

== Historic estates ==
Historic estates within the parish include:

- Great House, seat of the Yonge family
- Shute, seat of the Pole family
- Colcombe Castle, seat of the Courtenays, Earls of Devon, later of the Poles of Shute
