= Roger Tuckfield =

British landowner and Whig politician

Roger Tuckfield (c. 1685–1739), of Raddon Court, Devon, was a British landowner and Whig politician who sat in the House of Commons for 27 years between 1708 and 1739.

== Early life ==
Tuckfield was the eldest son of Roger Tuckfield of Raddon Court, Devon, and his wife Margaret Davie, daughter of William Davie, barrister, of Dura, Devon. He succeeded his father to Raddon Court on his death in 1687. He matriculated at Exeter College, Oxford on 8 August 1700, aged 15. In 1702 his guardian, Sir William Davie, 4th Baronet, purchased the manor of Ashburton for him. Davie, a Whig and a patron of local Dissenters, died in 1707 before conveying it to Tuckfield, and so Tuckfield had to obtain an Act of Parliament early in 1708 to vest this and other estates in himself.

== Career ==
Tuckfield was elected Member of Parliament for Ashburton at a hard-fought by-election on 21 January 1708, and again at the subsequent 1708 general election. Like his uncle, he was noted as a Whig, and voted in favour of naturalizing the Palatines in 1709, and for the impeachment of Dr Sacheverell in 1710. He was returned in 1710, but was unseated on petition on 17 March 1711. He regained his seat at the 1713 general election and voted on 18 March 1714 against the motion leading to the expulsion of Richard Steele. He was returned unopposed for Ashburton at the general election of 1715 as a Whig and voted for the repeal of the Occasional Conformity and Schism Acts in 1719. He was returned unopposed again in 1722 and was elected in contests in 1727 and 1734. Over these years he kept a low profile and there are no recorded votes by him.

== Death and legacy ==
Tuckfield died unmarried on 26 March 1739. He left Ashburton to his sister Margaret, the wife of John Harris, on whose death in 1754 it was inherited by her daughter, by her first husband, Margaret Rolle, 15th Baroness Clinton, the wife of Robert Walpole, 2nd Earl of Orford. Raddon went to his cousin John Tuckfield.

Parliament of Great Britain
Preceded by Richard Reynell; Gilbert Yarde	Member of Parliament for Ashburton; 1708–1711; With: Richard Reynell 1708; Robert Balle 1708-1710; Richard Lloyd 1710-1711	Succeeded by Richard Reynell; George Courtenay
Preceded by Richard Reynell; Andrew Quick	Member of Parliament for Ashburton; 1713– 1739; With: Richard Reynell 1713-1734; Sir William Yonge 1734-1735; Thomas Bladen 1735-1739	Succeeded by Thomas Bladen; Joseph Taylor
