= Richard Reynell (died 1734) =

English landowner and Tory politician

Member of Parliament for Ashburton
- In office 1702-1708; 1711-1734

Personal details
- Born: c. 1681 England
- Died: June 1734 (aged 52–53) East Ogwell, Devon, England
- Party: Tory
- Parent: Thomas Reynell (father)
- Relatives: Richard Reynell (uncle)

Richard Reynell (c.1681–1734) of East Ogwell and Denbury, near Ashburton, Devon was an English landowner and Tory politician who sat in the English House of Commons from 1702 to 1708 and in the British House of Commons from 1711 to 1734.

== Early life ==
Reynell was the third, but eldest surviving, son of Thomas Reynell of East Ogwell and his second wife Elizabeth Gould, daughter of James Gould, merchant, of Exeter, Devon, and London. His father had sat in the parliaments during The Protectorate and was a patron of the Dissenters within the town. Reynell succeeded to the estates of his father in 1698.

== Career ==
At the 1702 general election, Reynell was returned unopposed as Member of Parliament for Ashburton. He was a moderate Tory and was generally active in parliament. After being elected in a contest at the 1705 general election, he was listed as ‘Low Church’ and voted against the Court candidate for Speaker. He was defeated at the 1708 general election and again in the poll at Ashburton again at the 1710 general election. However, he was seated on a petition on 17 March 1711. He was listed among the ‘worthy patriots’ but later in the Parliament appeared to be a ‘whimsical’ Tory, showing sympathy with dissent. He was elected again for Ashburton in 1713. At the 1715 general election he was returned unopposed for Ashburton. He was classified as a Whig, but in fact, he opposed the administration in all subsequent votes. He was returned unopposed again at the 1722 general election . In 1727 he faced a contest and was elected successfully. However, he was defeated in the 1734 general election.

== Death and legacy ==
Reynell died in June 1735 at East Ogwell and was buried there on 14 June. The beneficiary of his will was his niece Rebecca Whitrow, the wife of Joseph Taylor. Reynell had instructed that his estates be sold for her benefit, but her husband then purchased them as the absolute estate of inheritance, which he settled on his wife and son.

Parliament of England
Preceded by William Stawell; Sir Thomas Lear	Member of Parliament for Ashburton; 1702–1708; With: Sir Thomas Lear 1702-1705; Gilbert Yarde 1705-1708; Roger Tuckfield 1708	Succeeded by Robert Balle; Roger Tuckfield
Parliament of Great Britain
Preceded by Richard Lloyd; Roger Tuckfield	Member of Parliament for Ashburton; 1711 –1734; With: George Courtenay 1711; Andrew Quick 1711-1713; Roger Tuckfield 1713-1734	Succeeded by Sir William Yonge; Roger Tuckfield
