= Henry Cressett Pelham =

British politician (c.1729–1803)

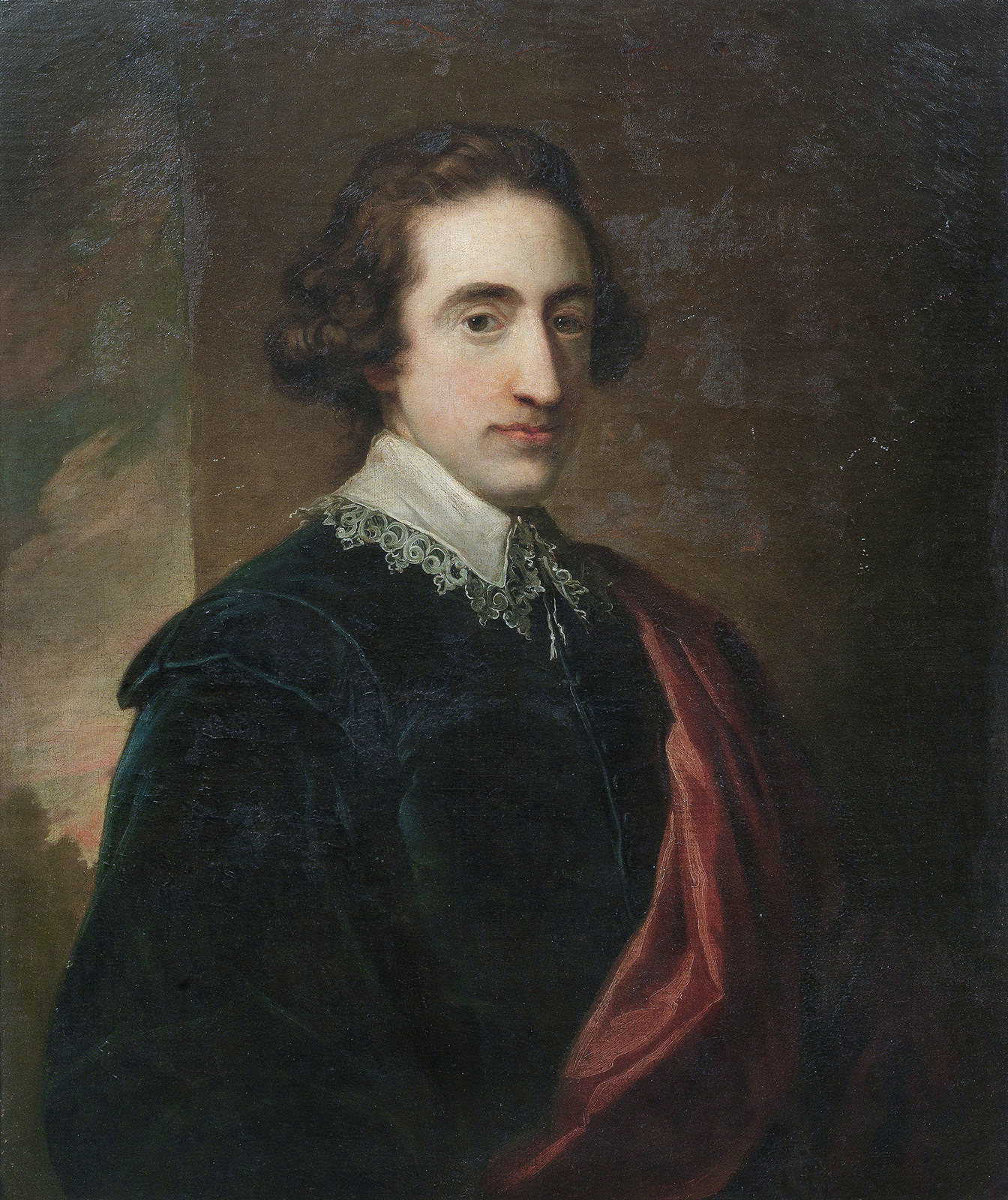
Henry Cresset Pelham (Nathaniel Dance-Holland)

Henry Cressett Pelham (1729? – January 1803) was a British politician, known as Henry Pelham until 1792.

The youngest son of Thomas Pelham, he was educated at Corpus Christi College, Cambridge, and became a fellow of Peterhouse in 1751.

In the same year, he was returned for Bramber as a Government supporter; the electoral patronage there was leased by Lord Archer from Sir Henry Gough, who controlled it. In the 1754 election, he was instead returned for another government borough, Tiverton in Cornwall.

Pelham apparently took little interest in politics, and in 1758, through the patronage of his second cousin once removed, the Duke of Newcastle, obtained an appointment as a Commissioner of Customs. This obliged him to vacate his seat, and he was replaced by Sir Edward Hussey-Montagu. Pelham's political detachment led him to be spared in December 1762, when other relatives of Newcastle were removed from office.

He married Jane, the daughter of Nicholas Hardinge, on 1 September 1767. They had three children:

- John Cressett Pelham (?1769–1838)
- Frances Cressett Pelham, married Rev. George Thursby; their descendants became the Thursby-Pelhams
- Anne Cressett Pelham, married Thomas Papillon

Pelham succeeded his brother John in the Catsfield and Crowhurst estates in 1786. He resigned his Customs office in 1788 and was granted an annual pension of £761. He adopted the additional surname of Cressett in 1792 after inheriting from his niece Miss Cressett, and died in early 1803. He was buried at Cound on 8 January 1803.

Parliament of Great Britain
Preceded by Henry Gough; Joseph Damer	Member of Parliament for Bramber; 1751–1754; With: Joseph Damer	Succeeded by Viscount Malpas; Nathaniel Newnham
Preceded by Sir Dudley Ryder; Henry Conyngham	Member of Parliament for Tiverton; 1754–1758; With: Sir William Yonge 1754–55; Thomas Ryder 1755–56; Nathaniel Ryder 1756–58	Succeeded by Nathaniel Ryder; Sir Edward Hussey-Montagu
