= Thomas Bladen =

Colonial governor in North America & politician (1698-1780)

8th Governor of Restored Proprietary Government
- In office 1742–1746/47
- Preceded by: Samuel Ogle
- Succeeded by: Samuel Ogle

Member of Parliament for Ashburton
- In office 1735–1741 Serving with Roger Tuckfield, Joseph Taylor
- Preceded by: Sir William Yonge; Roger Tuckfield
- Succeeded by: John Harris; John Arscott

Member of Parliament for Steyning
- In office 1727–1734 Serving with The Viscount Vane
- Preceded by: John Gumley; William Stanhope
- Succeeded by: Marquess of Carnarvon; Sir Robert Fagg, Bt

Personal details
- Born: 23 February 1698 Annapolis, Maryland
- Died: 2 February 1780 (aged 81) Leyton Grange, England
- Spouse: Barbara Janssen (m. 1731–1780)
- Relations: Martin Bladen (uncle); Nathaniel Bladen (grandfather); William Capell (grandson); Thomas Bladen Capel (grandson)
- Children: Barbara St John; Harriet, Countess of Essex
- Parent(s): William Bladen; Anne Van Swearingen
- Education: Westminster School

Thomas Bladen (23 February 1698 – 2 February 1780) was a colonial governor in North America and politician who sat in the British House of Commons between 1727 and 1741. He served as the 19th Proprietary Governor of Maryland from 1742 to 1747.

== Early life ==
Coat of Arms of Thomas Bladen

Bladen was born in Maryland in 1698, the eldest son of William Bladen (1672–1718) of Annapolis, who came to Maryland in 1690, and his wife Anne Van Swearingen. Among his siblings was Anne Bladen (wife of Benjamin Tasker Sr., also a Governor of Maryland).

Thomas was the grandson of Nathaniel Bladen (an attorney who was steward to Thomas Osborne, 1st Duke of Leeds) and Isabella Fairfax (daughter of Sir William Fairfax of Steeton). He was the nephew of Colonel Martin Bladen, Commissioner of the Board of Trade and Plantations.

Bladen travelled early to England in 1712, where he was educated at Westminster School. He disposed of his Maryland property on his father's death in 1718.

== Political career ==
Bladen was returned as Member of Parliament (MP) for Steyning at the 1727 British general election by the Duke of Chandos at the request of his uncle Martin Bladen. He voted with the Government. At the 1734 British general election he stood for parliament at Amersham, where he was defeated then and at a by-election in February 1735. He was returned as MP for Ashburton at another by-election on 20 February 1735. He was defeated at the 1741 British general election. He also saw military service as a colonel.

=== Life in Maryland ===
In 1742, Bladen returned to Maryland as provincial Governor, on the recommendation of his brother-in-law, Lord Baltimore. He was the first governor to be born in the Province. He also served as surveyor general, Western Shore, 1742–1746, and chancellor, 1742–1746/47. While governor, he concluded a peace with the Six Nations. He negotiated with Pennsylvania authorities for the settlement of the Maryland–Pennsylvania boundary.

Upon his arrival in Maryland, the Legislature awarded him £4,000 to build himself a residence, which was £1,000 more than his predecessor. In 1744, he bought 4 acres (16,000 m^{2}) of land in Annapolis from Stephen Bordley and commenced construction of a building, now McDowell Hall, St. John's College, as a governor's residence. He quickly disagreed with the Legislature about its architecture and became involved in a lawsuit with Bordley, the previous owner, and construction halted.

While as governor in Maryland in 1744, Bladen organized the first ice cream social in the United States. The social was organized while at a dinner party.

Bladen quickly became an unpopular governor, and was dismissed from office by October 1746 because he was "tactless and quarrelsome". He returned to England in 1746, when he was succeeded by Samuel Ogle, husband of his niece Anne Tasker. Ogle had been governor prior to Bladen's arrival in Maryland.

== Personal life ==
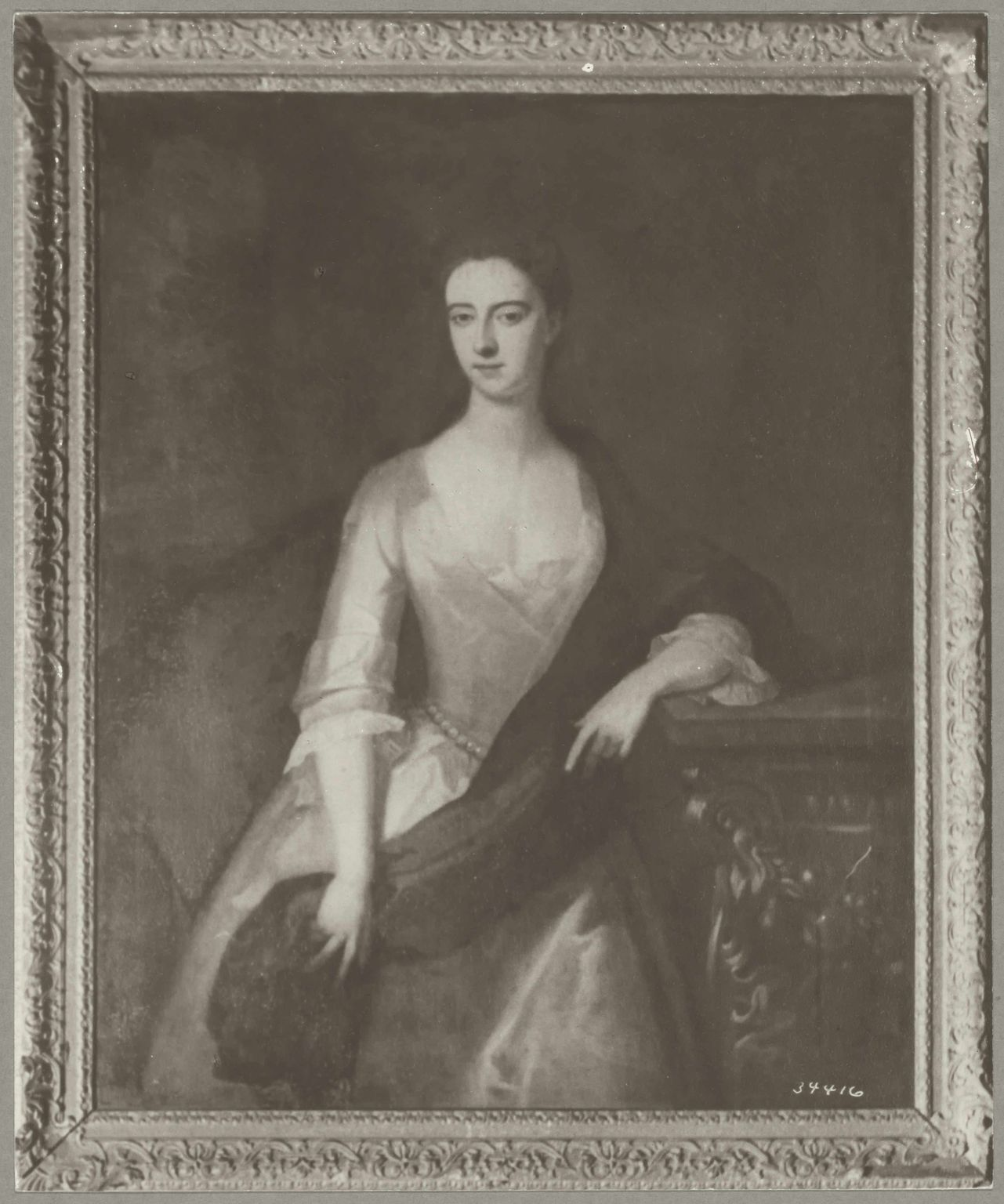
Barbara Janssen

In 1731, he married Barbara Janssen in England. She was a daughter of Sir Theodore Janssen, 1st Baronet and the former Williamza Henley. Through her sister Mary Janssen, she was a sister-in-law of Charles Calvert, 5th Baron Baltimore and Proprietor of the Province, and aunt to Caroline Calvert Eden (wife of Governor Sir Robert Eden, 1st Baronet, of Maryland). Soon after his marriage he acquired the Glastonbury Abbey estate from the Duke of Devonshire for £12,700, reportedly after beating him at dice. Together, they were the parents of two daughters:

- Barbara Bladen (1733–1821), who married Gen. The Hon. Henry St John (1738–1818), MP and brother of Frederick St John, 2nd Viscount Bolingbroke, in 1771.
- Harriet Bladen (1735–1821), who married William Capell, 4th Earl of Essex (1732–1799), becoming the Countess of Essex and the ancestress of the 6th and subsequent earls.

Bladen lived at Leyton Grange in England where he died in 1780 and was buried in the churchyard of St Mary's Leyton. Bladen's wife Barbara, who had a life interest in Glastonbury, died in 1783 and their heirs were their daughters Barbara and Harriet who sold the whole estate in 1799.

=== Legacy ===
The Governor's residence sat uncompleted until 1766 when the roof collapsed. The building now serves as the central hall of St. John's College and is named McDowell Hall. The nickname for McDowell Hall is "Bladen's Folly".

The town of Bladensburg, Maryland, which was incorporated in the first year of his governorship as Garrison's Landing, was renamed after him.

Parliament of Great Britain
Preceded by John Gumley; William Stanhope	Member of Parliament for Steyning; 1727–1734; With: The Viscount Vane	Succeeded by Marquess of Carnarvon; Sir Robert Fagg, Bt
Preceded by Sir William Yonge; Roger Tuckfield	Member of Parliament for Ashburton; 1735–1741; With: Roger Tuckfield to 1739; Joseph Taylor 1739–1741	Succeeded by John Harris; John Arscott
Political offices
Preceded by Samuel Ogle	Governor of Maryland; 1742–1746/47	Succeeded by Samuel Ogle
