= Joseph Taylor (died 1746) =

British politician

Joseph Taylor (c. 1693–1746) was a British politician who sat in the House of Commons from 1739 to 1741.

Taylor was the only son of Captain Joseph Taylor, RN of Plymouth, Devon and his wife Mary. He matriculated at Exeter College, Oxford on 24 October 1710, aged 17; and was admitted at Middle Temple in 1712. He married Rebecca Whitrow, daughter of John Whitrow of Dartmouth and his wife Mary Reynell, daughter of Thomas Reynell, MP on 16 August 1726. In. 1733, he succeeded his father

At the 1734 general election Taylor stood for Parliament at Ashburton with his wife's uncle, Richard Reynell who had represented the seat continuously since 1711, but they were both unsuccessful. Reynell died in 1735, and instructed that his estates be sold for the benefit of his niece who was Taylor's wife. Taylor, in fact, in the following year purchased these estates, which under the terms of his marriage settlement he was then required to settle on his wife and eldest son.

Taylor was returned unopposed as Member of Parliament for Ashburton at a by-election on 16 April 1739. As an anti-ministerial Whig, he was among those MPs who withdrew from the House before the vote on the motion for Walpole's dismissal in February 1741. He did not stand at the 1741 general election.

Taylor died on 6 May 1746, leaving two sons and a daughter.

Parliament of Great Britain
Preceded by Thomas Bladen; Roger Tuckfield	Member of Parliament for Ashburton; 1739 –1741; With: Thomas Bladen	Succeeded by John Harris; John Arscott
