= Arthur Arscott =

Arthur Arscott (1683–1762) of Tetcott, Devon, was a British landowner and politician who sat in the House of Commons from 1722 to 1747.

Arscott was baptized on 3 June 1683, the second (but eldest) surviving son of John Arscott of Tetcott and his second wife Prudence. In 1709 he succeeded to the estates of his father. He married Elizabeth Trefusis, daughter of Francis Trefusis of Trefusis, on 21 September 1704 but she died ten years later and was buried on 1 September 1714. He later married Gwen Yonge, daughter of Sir Walter Yonge, 3rd Baronet MP, of Colleton, Devon.

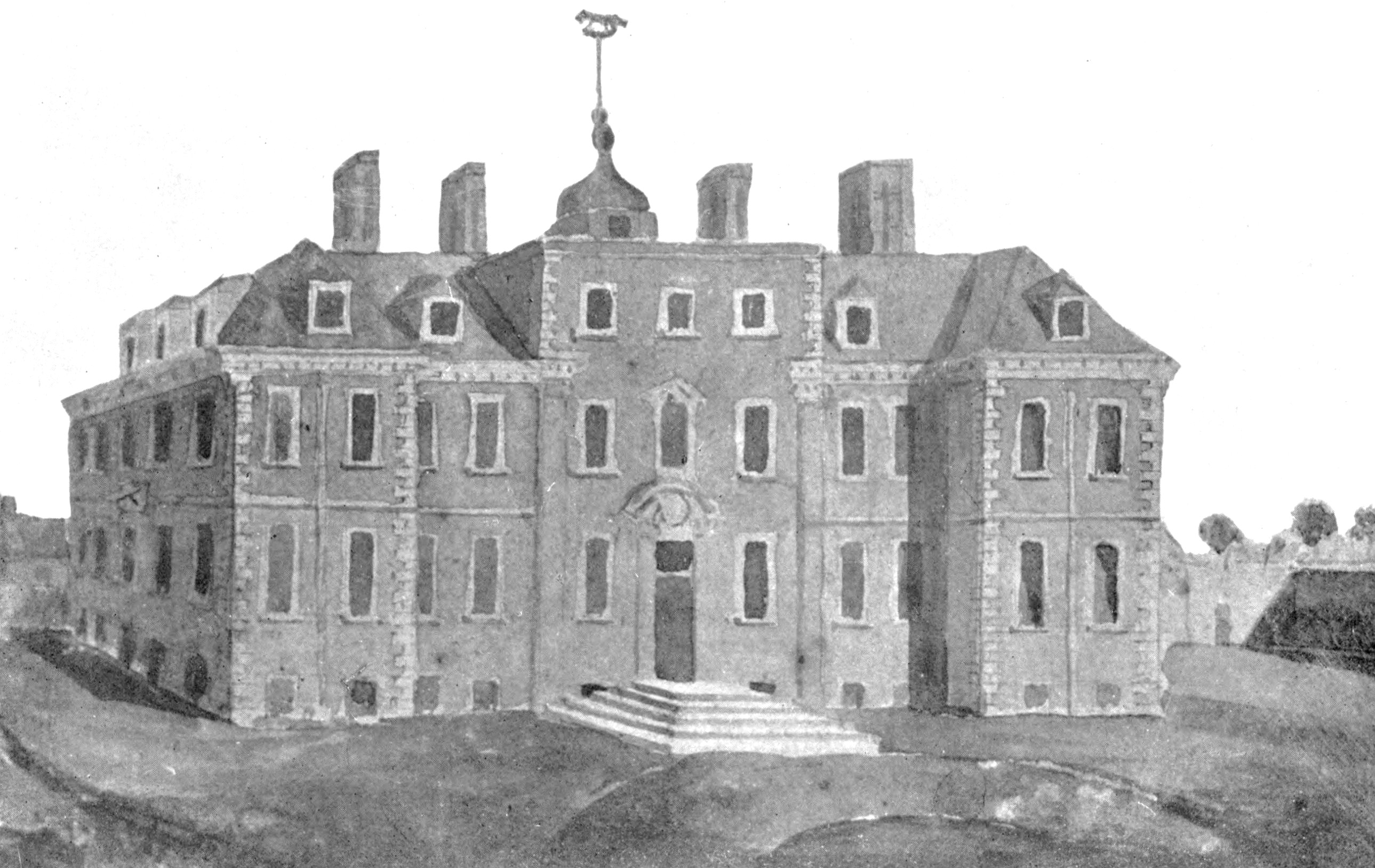
Tetcott House

In the 1722 general election, Arscott ran unopposed as Member of Parliament for Tiverton at the suggestion of his brother-in-law, Sir William Yonge. He ran unopposed in 1727 and 1734. He was elected for Tiverton after a contest in the 1741 general election. Whenever he voted, he supported the Administration. He was classed as Old Whig in 1746. He did not stand in the 1747 general election.

Arscott was buried at Tetcott, on 3 September 1762. He had three sons by his second wife, including John Arscott, MP for Ashburton.

Parliament of Great Britain
Preceded by Sir Edward Northey; Thomas Bere	Member of Parliament for Tiverton; 1722–1747; With: Thomas Bere 1722-1726; George Deane 1726-1727; Sir William Yonge, Bt 1727-1728; James Nelthorpe 1728-1734 (Sir) Dudley Ryder 1734-1747	Succeeded by Sir William Yonge, Bt; Sir Dudley Ryder
