= Richard Lloyd (died 1714) =

Richard Lloyd (c. 1661 - 1714) was an Anglo-Irish plantation owner and Whig politician who sat in the British House of Commons from 1708 to 1711.

Lloyd was the second son of Owen Lloyd of the Abbey, Boyle, county Roscommon, Ireland, and his wife Elizabeth Fitzgerald, daughter of Richard Fitzgerald. His grandfather was Welsh and settled in Ireland. He was admitted at Trinity College, Dublin on 10 May 1677, aged 15 and at Lincoln's Inn on 12 February 1681. He went to Jamaica where he became a successful colonist.

In 1689 Lloyd was petitioning for the post of Clerk of the crown and peace for Jamaica and was appointed to the post in 1690. He married Mary Guy, daughter of Richard Guy, planter of Jamaica, on 24 July 1690. In 1691, he became a member of the Jamaican Assembly and came in for criticism from the governor of Jamaica, Lord Inchiquin. Inchiquin was replaced by Sir William Beeston, who asked that Lloyd be appointed to the Jamaican Council, and he sat as a councillor from 1692 to 1698. Lloyd became judge of admiralty in Jamaica in 1693 and in 1694 played a part in the island’s defence against a French attack. In 1695, he was promoted to Chief Justice of Jamaica, a post which he held until 1698. He and the attorney-general, William Brodrick, later fell out with Beeston and they returned to England in June 1698. He succeeded his brother Thomas to Crowghan, county Roscommon, in about 1699.

Lloyd did not return to Jamaica, but continued to run his Jamaican plantations as an absentee landlord. He was returned as Whig Member of Parliament for New Shoreham at the 1708 British general election. He was generally inactive in Parliamente but voted for the naturalization of the Palatines in 1709, and took an interest in schemes to settle some 200 Palatine families in Jamaica. The Board of Trade sought his advice in 1710 on ways of defending Jamaica from attack. On 18 February 1710 he was ordered to draft a bill to settle the African trade. He voted for the impeachment of Dr Sacheverell in 1710. At the 1710 British general election he was returned as MP for Ashburton but was unseated on petition on 17 March 1711.

Lloyd died in 1714, leaving two sons and two daughters. He left substantial estates in Jamaica and Ireland to his eldest son,

Parliament of Great Britain
Preceded by John Wicker; Nathaniel Gould	Member of Parliament for New Shoreham; 1708–1710; With: Anthony Hammond; Sir Gregory Page	Succeeded by Sir Gregory Page; Nathaniel Gould
Preceded by Robert Balle; Roger Tuckfield	Member of Parliament for Ashburton; 1710–1711; With: Roger Tuckfield	Succeeded by Richard Reynell; George Courtenay
