= Charles Seale-Hayne =

British politician

The Right Honourable Charles Seale Hayne

Paymaster General
- In office 18 August 1892 – 21 June 1895
- Monarch: Victoria
- Prime Minister: William Gladstone; The Earl of Rosebery
- Preceded by: The Lord Windsor
- Succeeded by: The Earl of Hopetoun

Member of Parliament for Ashburton
- In office 24 November 1885 – 22 November 1903
- Preceded by: Constituency established
- Succeeded by: Harry Eve

Personal details
- Born: 22 October 1833 Brighton, Sussex
- Died: 22 November 1903 (aged 70) Mayfair, London
- Party: Liberal

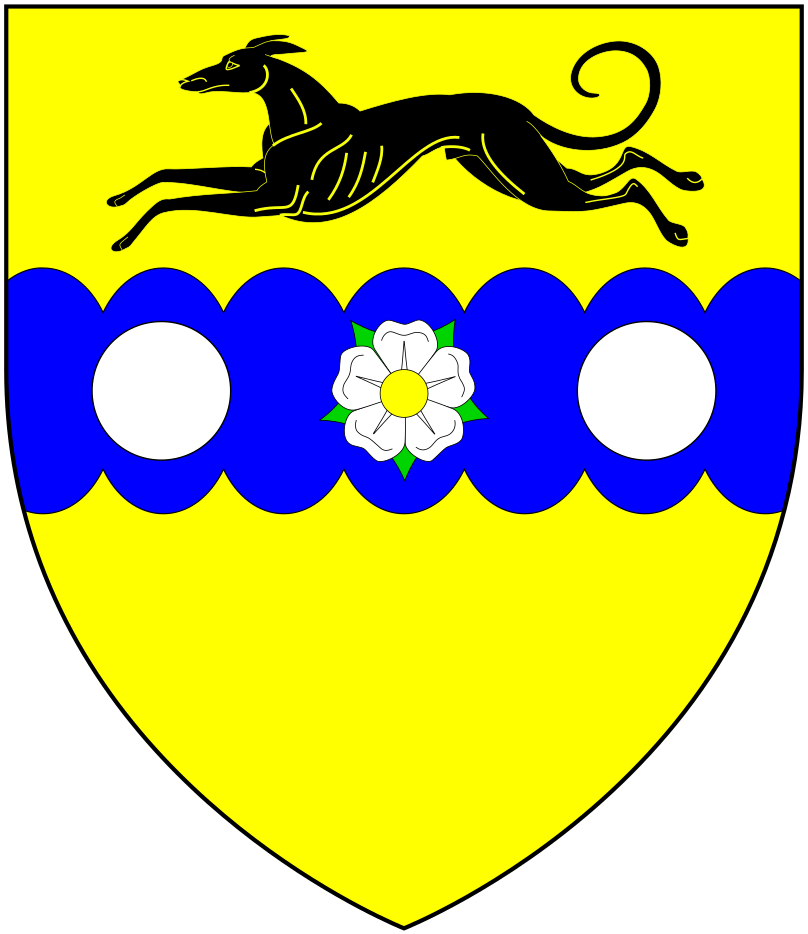
Arms of Hayne:

Charles Hayne Seale Hayne PC (22 October 1833 – 22 November 1903) of Fuge House in the parish of Blackawton and of Kingswear Castle, Dartmouth harbour, both in Devon, was a British businessman and Liberal politician, serving as member of parliament for Ashburton in Devon, from 1885 until his death in 1903. He served as Paymaster General between 1892 and 1895 in the Liberal administrations of William Gladstone and the Earl of Rosebery.

== Early life and education ==
Seale Hayne was born in Brighton, Sussex, in 1833, the only child of Charles Hayne (1809–1842), and Louisa (née Jennings) (1812–1879). His paternal grandfather was Sir John Henry Seale, who served as MP for Dartmouth from 1832 to 1844. He was educated at Eton.

== Political career ==
Called to the bar in 1857, Seale Hayne was Liberal member of parliament for Ashburton, Devon, from 1885 until his death in 1903. He served under Gladstone and later the Earl of Rosebery as Paymaster General from 1892 to 1895 and was appointed a Privy Counsellor in 1892. Apart from his political career he was also the first Chairman of the Dartmouth and Torbay Railway, and Lieutenant-Colonel of the 3rd Battalion (2nd Devon Militia), Devonshire Regiment, becoming its Honorary Colonel when he retired from the command in 1894.

== Personal life ==
Seale Hayne died suddenly in November 1903, aged 70, in Mayfair, London, and was buried in Kensal Green Cemetery. In his will he endowed a farming and food science college near Newton Abbot. Seale-Hayne College opened in 1919, later becoming part of the University of Plymouth. The university's Charles Seale-Hayne Library is named in his honour.

== Notes ==
Parliament of the United Kingdom
New constituency	Member of Parliament for Ashburton; 1885–1903	Succeeded by Harry Trelawney Eve
Political offices
Preceded by The Lord Windsor	Paymaster General; 1892–1895	Succeeded by The Earl of Hopetoun
