= Thomas Matheson =

British politician

Member of Parliament for Ashburton
- In office 28 July 1847 – 6 July 1852
- Preceded by: James Matheson
- Succeeded by: George Moffatt

Personal details
- Born: 1798
- Died: 14 February 1873 (aged 74–75)
- Party: Whig
- Parent: Donald Matheson

Thomas Matheson (1798 – 14 February 1873) was a British Whig politician. Son of Donald Matheson and brother of James Matheson (co-founder of Jardine Matheson & Co.), Matheson was born at Shinness, near Lairg, Sutherland, Scotland in 1798. In 1815 he joined the British Army as an Ensign. He became a lieutenant colonel in the 42nd Foot in 1843, when he retired on half-pay.

Matheson was elected unopposed as the Whig MP for Ashburton at the 1847 general election, taking up the seat previously held by his brother James Matheson. He stood down at the next election in 1852.

Parliament of the United Kingdom
Preceded by James Matheson	Member of Parliament for Ashburton; 1847–1852	Succeeded by George Moffatt
