= John Phillipson =

British Navy administrator, commissioner and Member of Parliament

John Phillipson (28 April 1698 – 27 November 1756) was a British Navy administrator and commissioner who also sat for over 20 years as a Member of Parliament.

He was born in Harwich, Essex, the son of John Phillipson, agent for the packet boats. Like his father he began his career as a clerk in the Navy Office in parallel with outside business interests. In 1733 he was elected a Director of the South Sea Company following a shareholder revolt against the former board. He later (in 1756) acted as Deputy Governor for a year.

In 1834 he stood as a Parliamentary candidate for New Shoreham and was returned with a good majority. After voting with the Government on a contentious issue in 1739 he was appointed a Navy commissioner. In 1741 he was re-elected to represent Harwich and was appointed an Admiralty Lord by the incoming government in 1743. In 1744 he was dismissed from the post and compensated with the title of Surveyor-general of woods and forests north and south of Trent, which he held from 1745 to his death.

He died in 1756. He had married in 1717 the daughter of naval commissioner Richard Burton, and had a daughter to whom he left his fortune.

Parliament of Great Britain
Preceded by Carteret Leathes; Charles Stanhope	Member of Parliament for Harwich; 1741–1756; With: Hill Mussenden, 1741–1747; Edward Coke, Viscount Coke, 1747–1753; Wenman Coke, 1753–1756	Succeeded by William Ponsonby; Wenman Coke
Preceded by Samuel Ongley; John Gould	Member of Parliament for New Shoreham; 1734–1741; With: Thomas Frederick, 1734–1740; John Frederick, 1740–1741	Succeeded by Charles Frederick; Thomas Brand
