= Sir Gregory Page, 1st Baronet =

British merchant and politician (1669–1720)

Sir Gregory Page, 1st Baronet (c. 1669 – 25 May 1720), of Greenwich, Kent, was an English brewer, merchant and Whig politician who sat in the House of Commons between 1708 and 1720.

== Early life ==
Page was the eldest son of Gregory Page (died 1693) and his second wife Elizabeth Burton. Page Senior was a wealthy London merchant, shipwright and director of the British East India Company, who owned a brewery in Wapping. He was also an Alderman of the City of London in 1687. Elizabeth Burton was a widow from Stepney. Page Junior married Mary Trotman, the 17-year-old daughter of Thomas and Mary Trotman of London, on 21 January 1690.

== Career ==
Page followed his father's footsteps as a brewer and merchant, building a vast fortune in trade with South and East Asia. He was on the committee of the Old East India Company from 1706 to 1708. At a by-election in December 1708, he was elected Whig Member of Parliament for New Shoreham, West Sussex where the prime industry was shipbuilding. In Parliament he voted in favour of the naturalization of the Palatines in 1709, and for the impeachment of Dr Sacheverell in 1710. He was a director of the East India Company from 1709 to 1712. At the 1710 British general election, he was re-elected MP for Shoreham despite accusations that he had bribed voters for their support. However he did not stand at the 1713 general election. From 1713 to 1714 he was a Director of the East India Company and was created a baronet on 3 December 1714.

Page was returned as Whig MP for New Shoreham, at the 1715 general election, and supported the Hanoverian government from then on. In 1715, he became a Director of the East India Company and in 1716 became a director of the Royal Hospital Greenwich, holding both positions for the rest of his life.

== Personal life and death ==
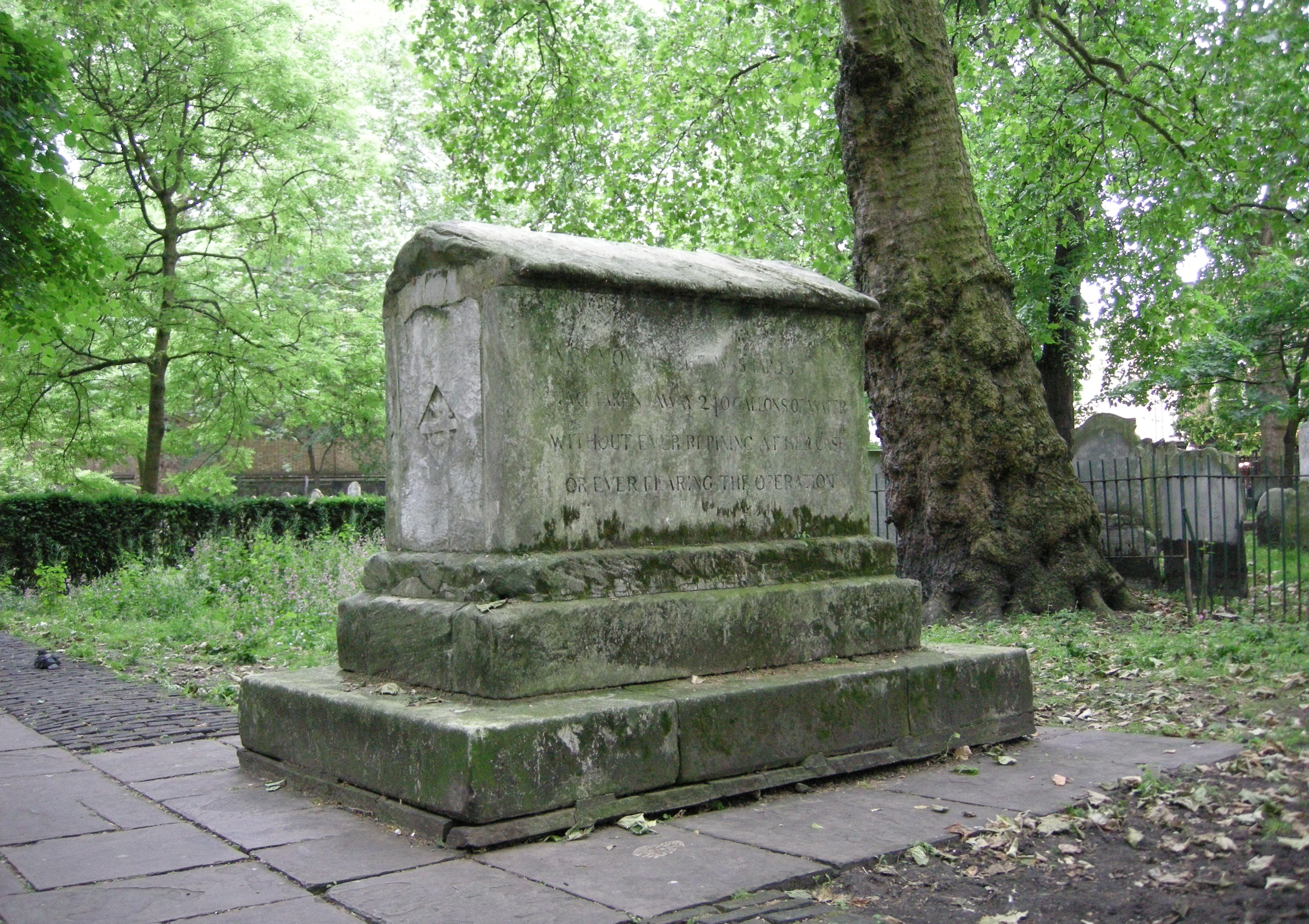
Monument of Dame Mary Page in Bunhill Fields burial ground

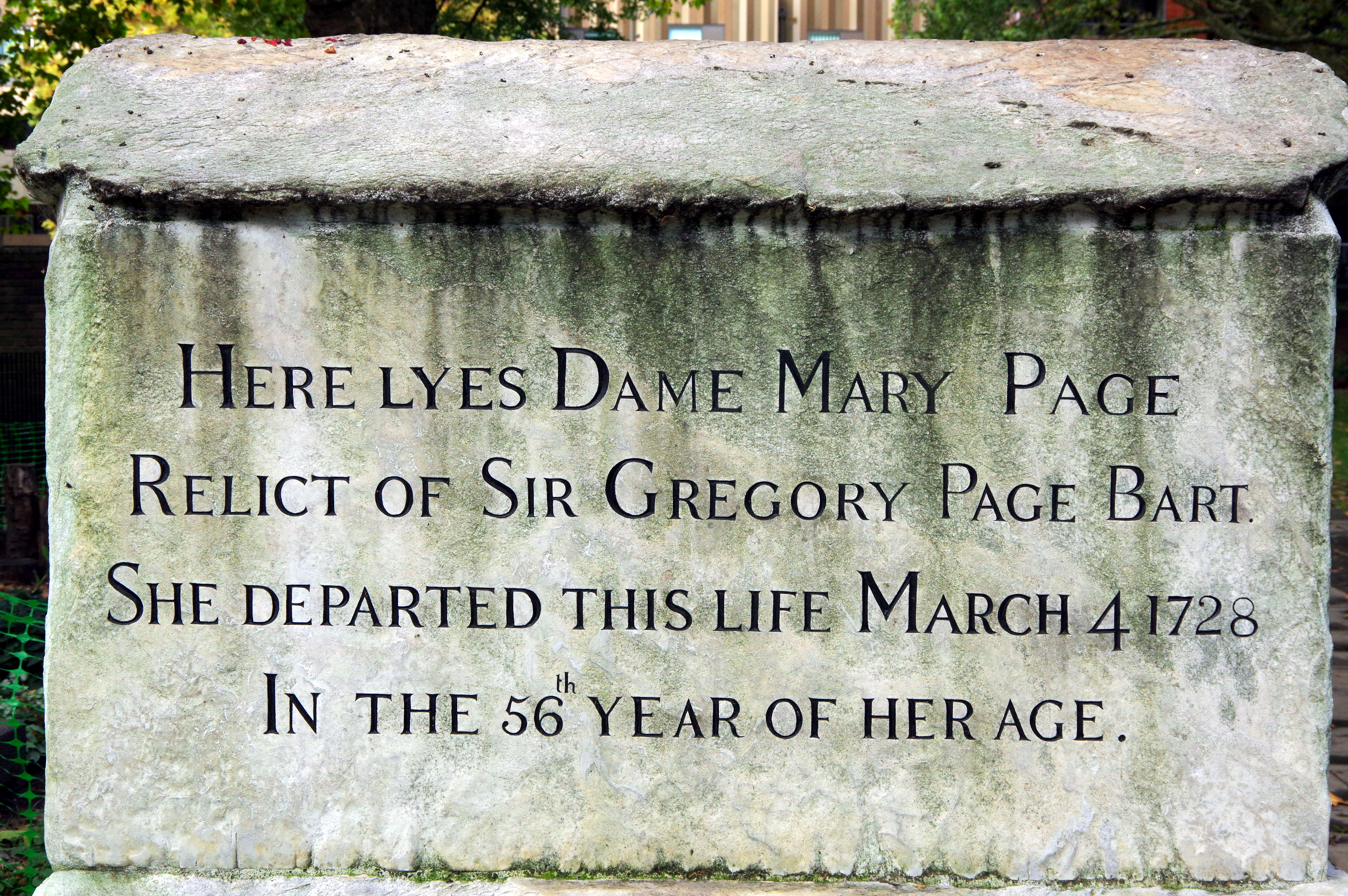
Monument detail

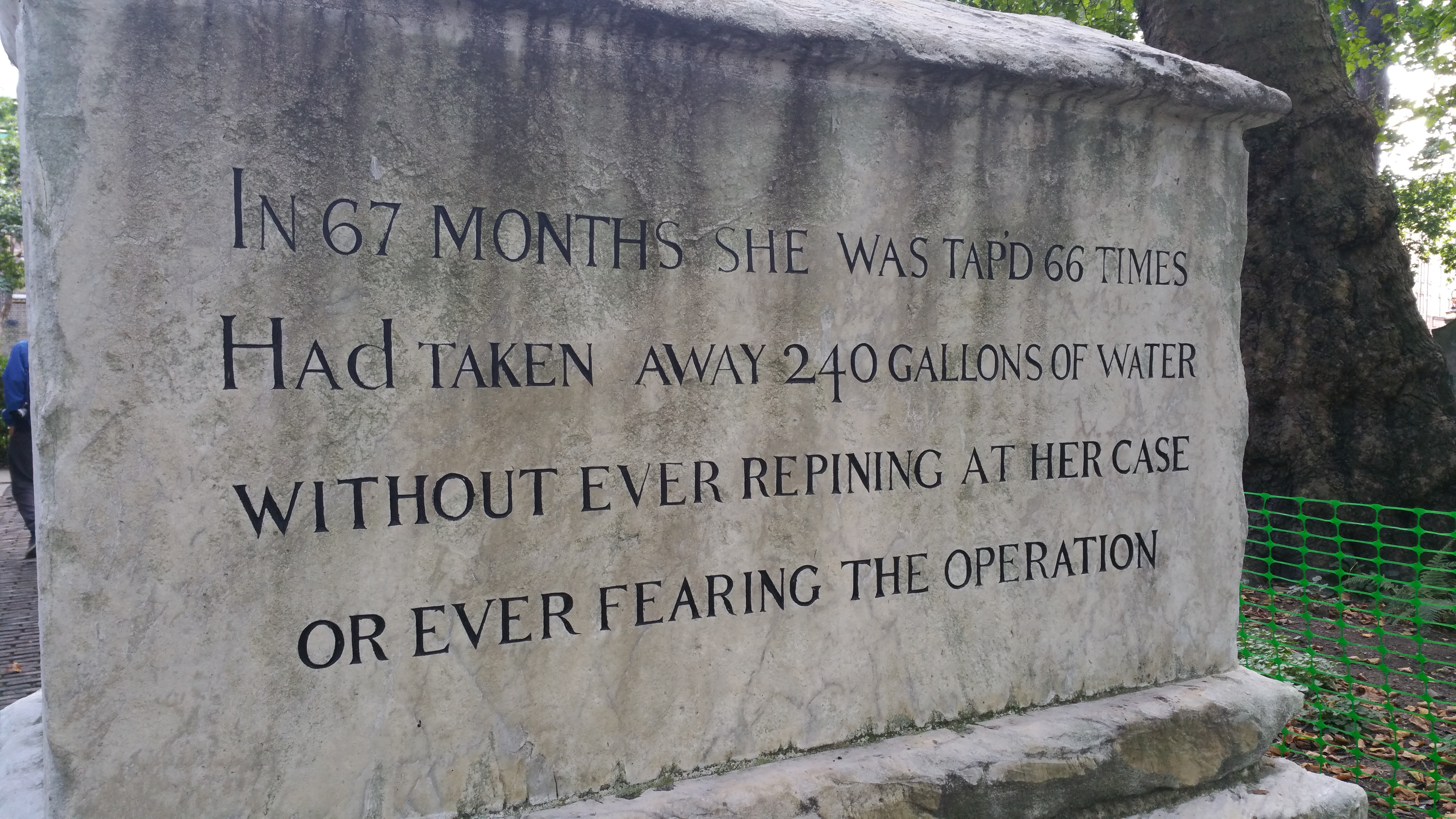
Monument detail

Page died on 25 May 1720 in his 51st year, and was buried at Greenwich on 2 June 1720. He left four children: two sons (Gregory and Thomas) and two daughters (Mary and Sophia). The baronetcy, with his "immense fortune", was inherited by his eldest son, Gregory. His widow died at Greenwich on 4 March 1729 in her 56th year. She was buried in a vault at Bunhill Fields on the outskirts of the City of London. Her epitaph hints at a painful illness, which was possibly Meigs's syndrome. The epitaph reads in part:

In 67 months, she was tap'd [tapped] 66 times, Had taken away 240 gallons of water, without ever repining at her case, or ever fearing the operation.

== Heirs ==
The first baronet's second son, Thomas, married a sister of Viscount Howe and was buried, without issue, at Greenwich on 4 November 1763. Gregory, the second baronet, died in 1776, when the baronetcy became extinct. The estate passed to Sir Gregory Turner, 3rd Baronet, who took the name Page-Turner in consequence. He was the grandson of the first baronet's daughter Mary (buried 18 February 1724 at Greenwich), who had married the first Turner baronet, Edward Turner. The first baronet's other daughter Sophia was the first wife of Lewis Way (a member of the Inner Temple, director of the South Sea Company and president of Guy's Hospital). She died without issue on 2 January 1735.

== Arms ==
His coat of arms was Azure a fess indented between three martlets Or.

Parliament of Great Britain
Preceded by Anthony Hammond; Richard Lloyd	Member of Parliament for New Shoreham; 1708–1713; With: Richard Lloyd 1708-1710 (Sir) Nathaniel Gould 1710-1713	Succeeded by Francis Chamberlayne (Sir) Nathaniel Gould
Preceded by Francis Chamberlayne (Sir) Nathaniel Gould	Member of Parliament for New Shoreham; 1715–1720; With: (Sir) Nathaniel Gould	Succeeded by Francis Chamberlayne (Sir) Nathaniel Gould
Baronetage of Great Britain
New title	Baronet (of Greenwich); 1714–1720	Succeeded by Gregory Page
