= Samuel Ongley (died 1747) =

English politician

Samuel Ongley (1697 – 15 June 1747), of Old Warden, Bedfordshire, was an English politician who sat in the House of Commons from 1729 to 1747.

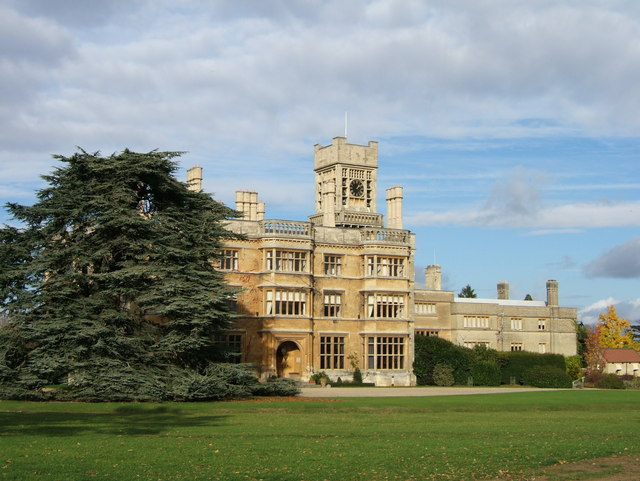
The mansion at Old Warden

Ongley was born in London, the son of draper Samuel Ongley and nephew and heir of Sir Samuel Ongley, MP of Old Warden Park, Bedfordshire. He matriculated at St John's College, Oxford in 1716. In 1726, he inherited the Old Warden estate on his uncle's death. He also married Anne Harvey, the daughter of John Harvey of Northill, Bedfordshire on 19 September 1726.

Ongley was returned as Member of Parliament (MP) for New Shoreham at a by-election on 29 January 1729. At the 1734 British general election he changed seats and was returned for Bedford. He was returned again for Bedford in 1741.

Ongley died childless on 15 June 1747. His estate was inherited by his relative Robert Henley, who then took the additional surname Ongley and was later created Baron Ongley in the Irish Peerage.

Parliament of Great Britain
Preceded by Francis Chamberlayne; Sir Nathaniel Gould	Member of Parliament for New Shoreham; 1729–1734; With: John Gould	Succeeded by Thomas Frederick; John Phillipson
