= Nathaniel Gould (1661–1728) =

English merchant and politician

Sir Nathaniel Gould (3 December 1661 – 21 July 1728) was an English merchant and politician who sat in the House of Commons of England from 1701 to 1707 and in the House of Commons of Great Britain between 1707 and 1728.

Gould owned shipbuilding yards in Shoreham and also contributed to the rebuilding of the market house at Shoreham. He was elected Member of Parliament for New Shoreham in 1701 when he was unseated for bribery (having handed out a guinea a man) and then re-elected. He held the seat until May 1708 and was re-elected in 1710. This time he retained the seat until his death in 1728 although his elections often gave rise to petitions on the grounds of bribery or intimidation.

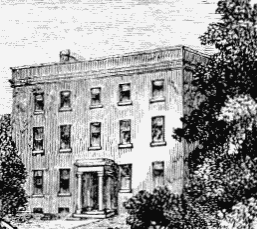
Fleetwood House, Stoke Newington, in 1750

Gould was also Governor of the Bank of England from 1711 to 1713 at the time when the South Sea Company was founded. He had earlier served as its Deputy Governor. He was knighted in 1721.

Gould married Frances, daughter of Sir John Hartopp, 3rd Baronet and granddaughter of Charles Fleetwood. One of their children married Thomas Cooke, also Governor of the Bank of England from 1737 to 1740.

Gould lived at Fleetwood House, Stoke Newington but also owned property at New Shoreham. He died aged 66. John Gould (MP) and Nathaniel Gould (MP), to whom he left the majority of his fortune, were his nephews. Sir Nathaniel's descendants through his daughter Mary, who married Sir Francis St John, include the Dukes of Manchester and Earls of Gosford.

== Notes ==
Parliament of England
Preceded by Charles Sergison; John Perry	Member of Parliament for New Shoreham; 1701–1707; With: Charles Sergison 1701–1702; John Perry 1702–1705; John Wicker 1705–1707	Succeeded by Parliament of Great Britain
Parliament of Great Britain
Preceded by Parliament of England	Member of Parliament for New Shoreham; 1707–1708; With: John Wicker	Succeeded by Anthony Hammond; Richard Lloyd
Preceded by Gregory Page; Richard Lloyd	Member of Parliament for New Shoreham; 1710–1728; With: Gregory Page 1710–1713, 1715–1720; Francis Chamberlayne 1713–1715, 1720–1728	Succeeded by Samuel Ongley; John Gould
Government offices
Preceded by Sir Gilbert Heathcote	Governor of the Bank of England; 1711 – 1713	Succeeded by John Rudge
