= James Nelthorpe (MP for Tiverton) =

British Member of Parliament (1675-1734)

James Nelthorpe (1675–1734), of Lynford, Norfolk, was a British landowner and Whig politician who sat in the House of Commons from 1728 to 1734.

== Early life ==
Nelthorpe was baptized on 17 November 1675, the son of Edward Nelthorpe of St. Mary Abchurch, London (second son of Sir Goddard Nelthorpe, 2nd Baronet), and his wife Mary Gostwick (daughter of Sir William Gostwick, 4th Baronet).

He was educated at Merchant Taylors School in 1687.

== Career ==
In 1717 he acquired the manor of Lynford from Sir Charles Turner, 1st Baronet where he built Lynford Hall. Sir Robert Walpole often spent a night there on his way to Houghton.

Nelthorpe was returned as Member of Parliament for Tiverton, at a by election on 1 March 1728, probably on Walpole's recommendation. He voted consistently with the Administration, except when he was absent on the excise bill.

== Personal life ==
Nelthorpe died unmarried on 20 April 1734, after the dissolution of Parliament but shortly before the 1734 British general election. He left a natural son, James Nelthorpe, to the guardianship of Walpole. He was known as "Rugged Nelthorpe" because of his pride and ill-nature.

Parliament of Great Britain
| Preceded by Arthur Arscott; Sir William Yonge, Bt | Member of Parliament for Tiverton –1734; With: Arthur Arscott | Succeeded by Arthur Arscott (Sir) Dudley Ryder |
