= Rawlin Mallock =

English politician

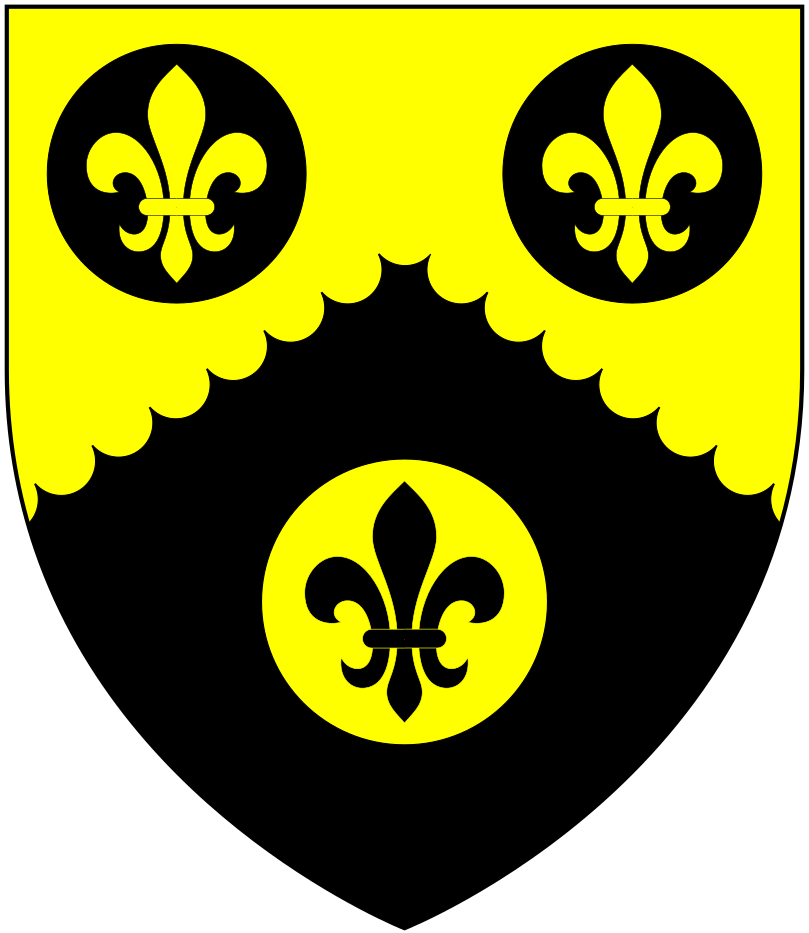
Arms of Mallock: Per chevron engrailed or and sable, on three roundels three fleurs-de-lys all counterchanged

Rawlin Mallock (c. 1649 – 1691), of Cockington, Devon, was an English politician.

He was a member (MP) of the parliament of England for Ashburton on 9 March 1677 and for Totnes in 1689.
