= James Matheson =

Scottish taipan (1796 - 1878)

Sir James Matheson FRS
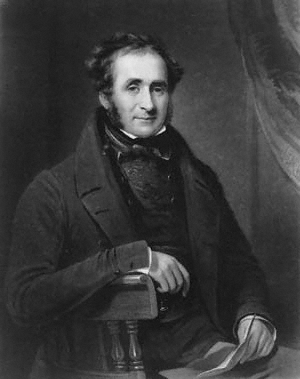
- James Matheson (published 1837)

Member of Parliament for Ashburton
- In office 1843–1847
- Preceded by: William Jardine
- Succeeded by: Thomas Matheson

Member of Parliament for Ross and Cromarty
- In office 1852–1868
- Preceded by: James Mackenzie
- Succeeded by: Alexander Matheson

Personal details
- Born: 17 October 1796 Shiness, Lairg, Scotland
- Died: 31 December 1878 (aged 82) Menton, France
- Citizenship: British
- Party: Whig
- Occupation: Taipan
- Known for: Co-founder of Jardine Matheson & Co.

Sir James Nicolas Sutherland Matheson, 1st Baronet, FRS (17 November 1796 – 31 December 1878), was a Scottish opium trader and taipan. Born in Shiness, Lairg, Sutherland, Scotland, he was the son of Captain Donald Matheson. He attended Edinburgh's Royal High School and the University of Edinburgh. He and William Jardine went on to co-found the Hong Kong-based trading conglomerate Jardine Matheson & Co. that became today's Jardine Matheson Holdings.

== China and Hong Kong ==
After leaving university, Matheson spent two years in a London agency house before departing for Calcutta, India, and a position in his uncle's trading firm, Mackintosh & Co.

In 1807, Matheson was entrusted by his uncle with a letter to be delivered to the captain of a soon-to-depart British vessel. He forgot to deliver the missive and the vessel sailed without it. Incensed at his nephew's negligence, the uncle suggested that young James might be better off back in Britain. He took his uncle at his word and went to engage a passage back home. However, a chance encounter with an old sea captain instead led to Matheson departing for Canton (Guangzhou).

Matheson first met William Jardine in Bombay in 1820. The two men later formed a partnership which also included Hollingworth Magniac and Daniel Beale. At first, the new firm dealt only with trade between Canton, Bombay and Calcutta, at that time called the "country trade" but later extended their business to London.

In 1827 Alexander Matheson lent James a small hand press for the printing of the Canton Register which James founded as the first English language news sheet in China, which was edited by William Wightman Wood, an American from Philadelphia who would later work for rival trading house Russell & Co.

On 1 July 1832, Jardine, Matheson and Company, a partnership, between William Jardine, James Matheson as senior partners, and Hollingworth Magniac, Alexander Matheson, Jardine's nephew Andrew Johnstone, Matheson's nephew Hugh Matheson, John Abel Smith, and Henry Wright, as the first partners was formed in Canton, and took the Chinese name 'Ewo' (怡和 "Yee-Wo" Literally Happy Harmony). The name was taken from the earlier Ewo Hong founded by Howqua which had an honest and upright reputation.

In 1834, Parliament ended the monopoly of the British East India Company on trade between Britain and China. Jardine, Matheson and Company took this opportunity to fill the vacuum left by the East India Company. With its first voyage carrying tea, the Jardine ship Sarah left for England. Jardine Matheson began its transformation from a major commercial agent of the East India Company into the largest British trading hong, or firm, in Asia from its base in Hong Kong.

Jardine wanted the opium trade to expand in China and dispatched Matheson to England to lobby the Government to press the Qing government to further open up trade. Matheson's mission proved unsuccessful and he was rebuked by the then British Foreign Secretary the Duke of Wellington. In a report, Matheson complained to Jardine over being insulted by an "arrogant and stupid man". Matheson expressed his views plainly, contemporaneously describing, "... the Chinese [as] a people characterised by a marvellous degree of imbecility, avarice, conceit and obstinacy..."

Matheson returned to Asia in 1838 and the following year Jardine left for England to continue lobbying.

Jardine's lobbying efforts proved more effective than his partner's and he succeeded in persuading the new British Foreign Secretary Lord Palmerston to wage war on Qing China. The subsequent First Opium War led to the Treaty of Nanking which allowed Jardine Matheson to expand from Canton to Hong Kong and mainland China.

After Jardine died a bachelor in 1843, his nephews David and Andrew Jardine assisted James Matheson in running the hong as taipan. Matheson retired as taipan during the early 1840s and handed over to David Jardine, another nephew of Jardine.

=== Society for the Diffusion of Useful Knowledge in China ===
On 29 November 1834, Matheson became chairman of the newly formed "Society for the Diffusion of Useful Knowledge in China". The committee members represented a wide section of the business and missionary community in Canton: David Olyphant, William Wetmore, James Innes, Thomas Fox, Elijah Coleman Bridgman, Karl Gützlaff and John Robert Morrison. John Francis Davis, at that time chief superintendent of British trade in China, was made an honorary member.

== Return to Scotland ==
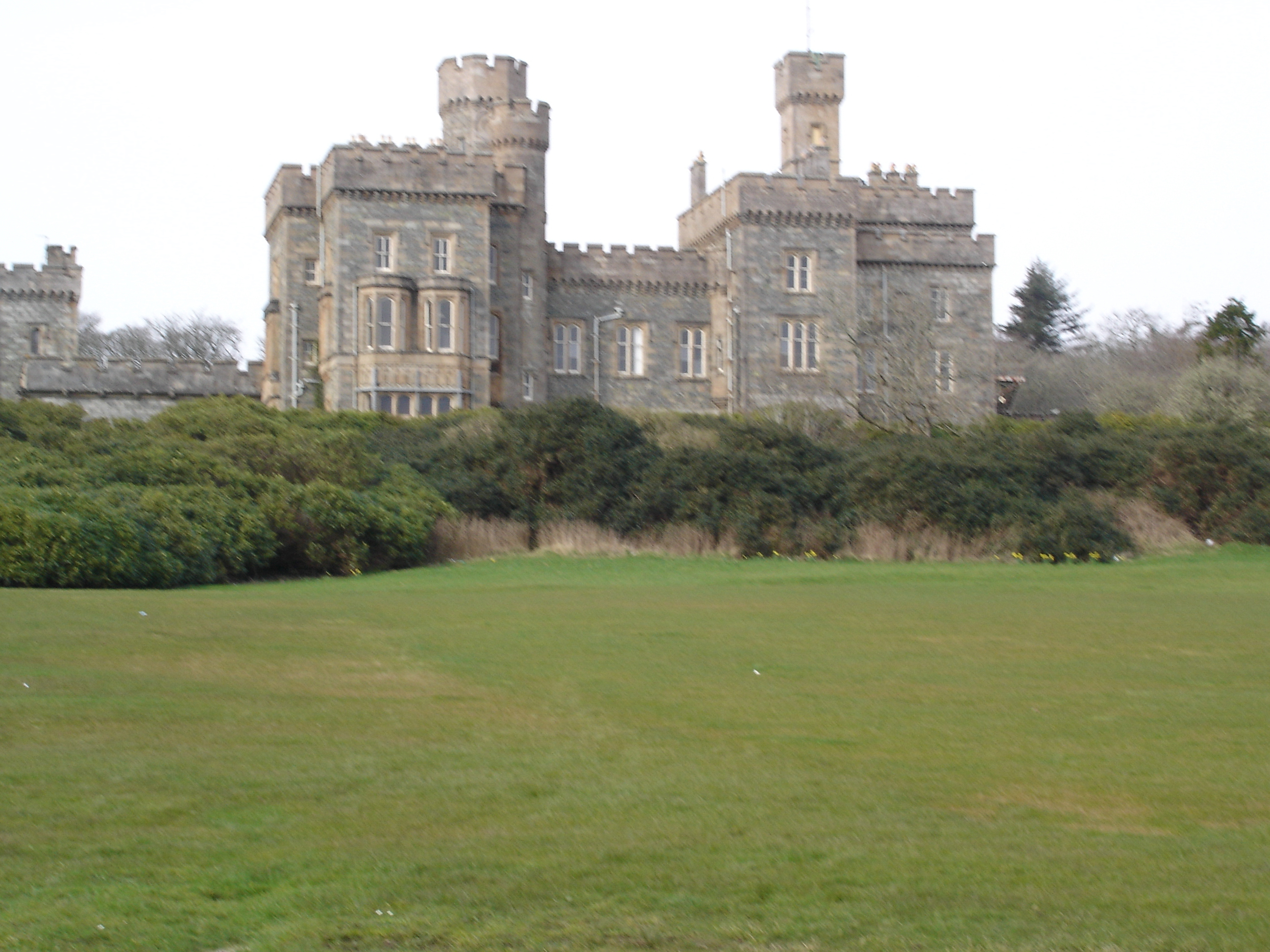
Lews Castle, Isle of Lewis

In 1844 Matheson bought the Scottish Isle of Lewis for over half a million pounds and built Lews Castle, near Stornoway, clearing more than 500 families off the land by arranging their emigration to Canada. In 1845, he began a programme of improvements on the island, including drainage schemes and road construction. He increased the programme during the Highland Potato Famine and by 1850 had spent £329,000 on the island. Between 1851 and 1855 he assisted 1,771 people to emigrate.

When in London Matheson lived at 13 Cleveland Row. He was elected a Fellow of the Royal Society in 1846. As a result of his actions during the Highland Potato Famine, Matheson was awarded a baronetcy in 1851. He became Member of Parliament (MP) for Ashburton from 1843 to 1852 on the death of William Jardine (the previous incumbent) and for Ross and Cromarty from 1852 to 1868. He led an active public life into his eighth decade, and for many years served as chairman of the Peninsular and Oriental Steam Navigation Company. His nephews succeeded him as directors of Jardine Matheson and Matheson & Company.

Matheson died in 1878 at the age of 82 in Menton, France. He had married on 9 November 1843 Mary Jane Perceval the daughter of Michael Henry Perceval (1779–1829), illegitimate son of assassinated British Prime Minister Spencer Perceval, Commissioner of the Port of Quebec from 1826 and a member, from Spencer Wood, of the Legislative Council of Lower Canada. The Mathesons had no children and the baronetcy became extinct. The Lewis estate passed to his widow and subsequently to his nephew Donald (1819–1901) and great-nephew Colonel Duncan Matheson (1850–1930).

His widow erected a memorial to him in the grounds of Lews Castle.

He left £1,500 to help pay for the construction of the harbour at Port of Ness.

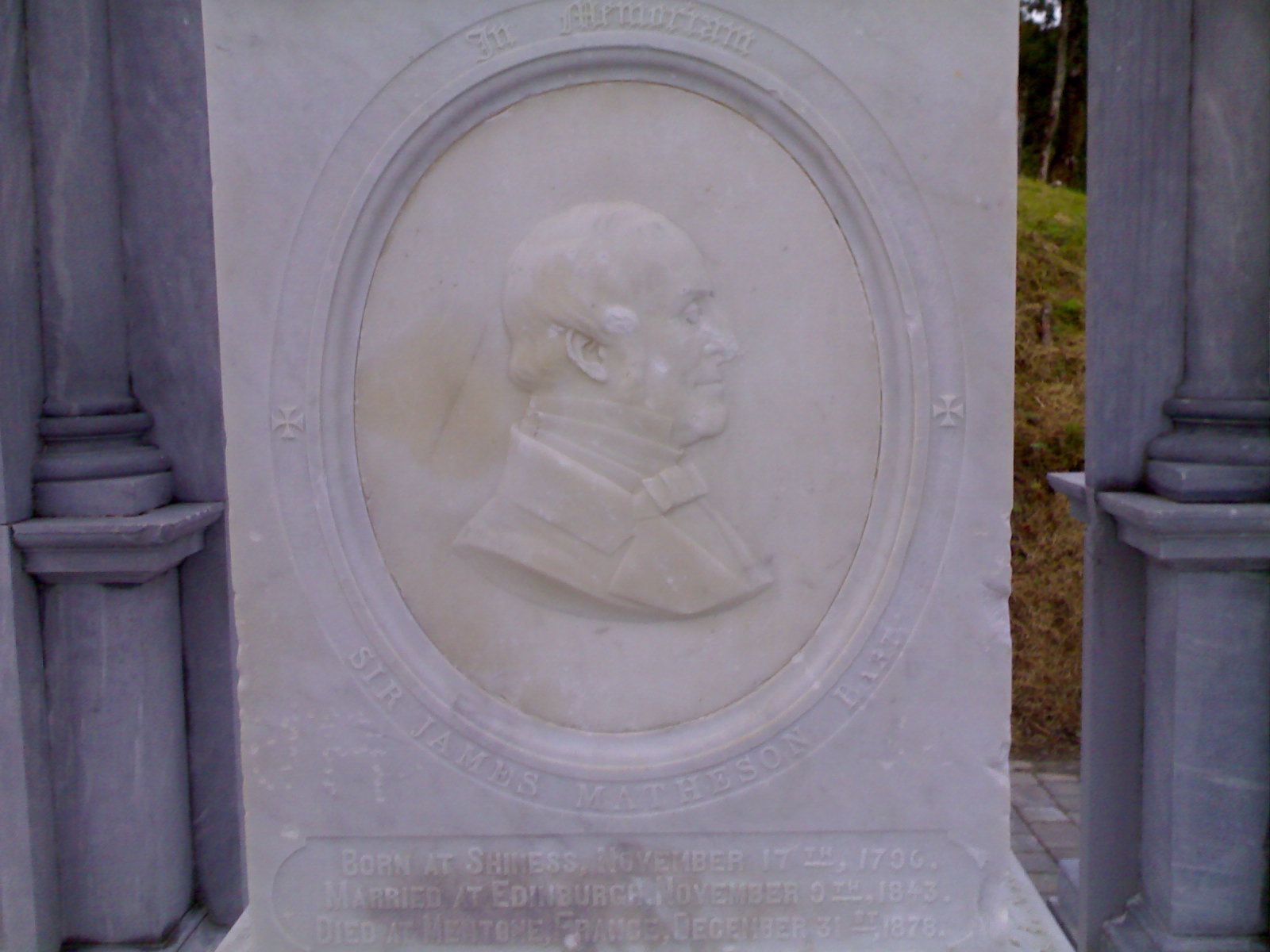
James Matheson Memorial built in 1880 in Stornoway Castle Grounds refurbished in 2006

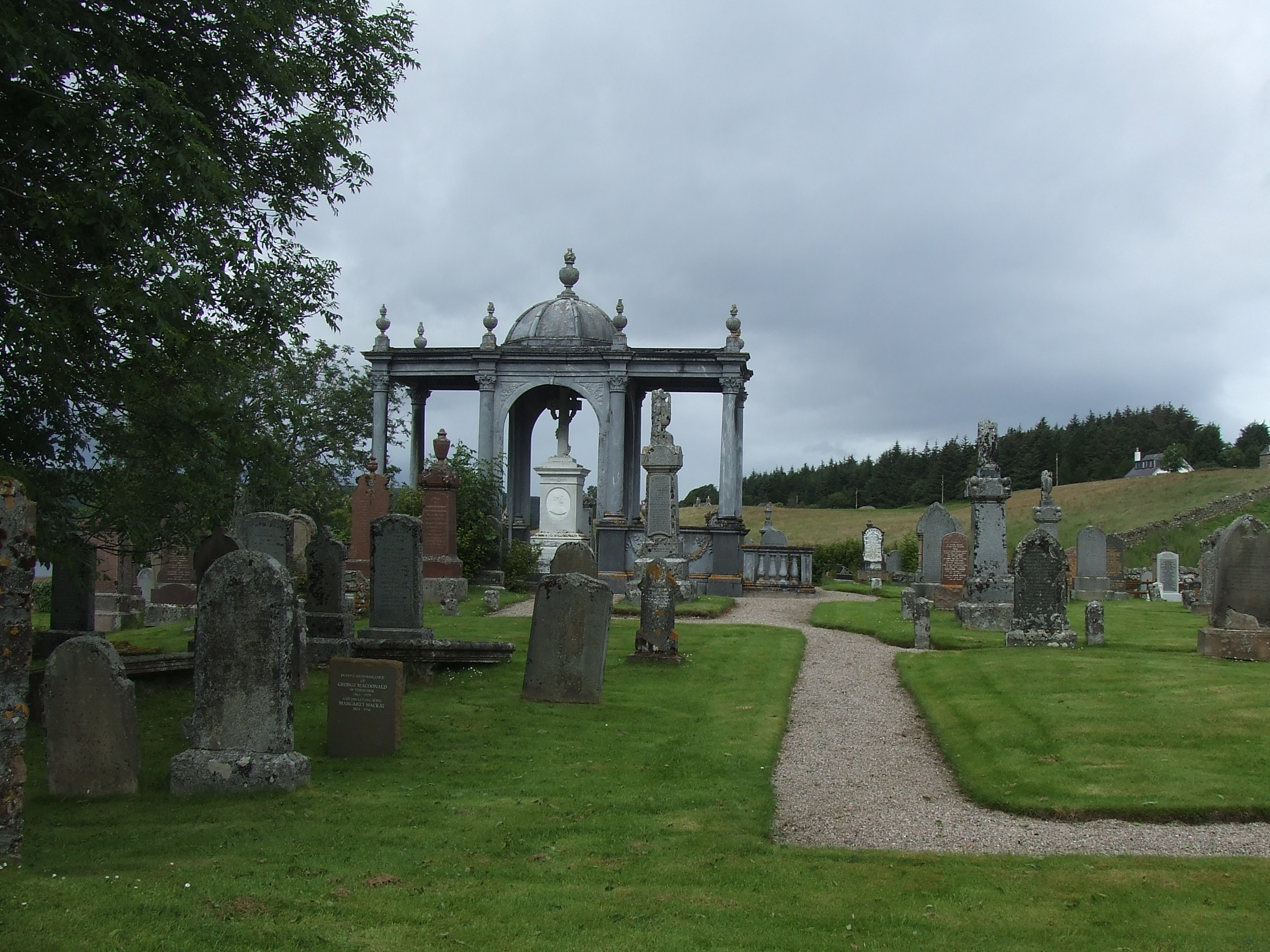
James Matheson's tomb in Lairg, Scotland

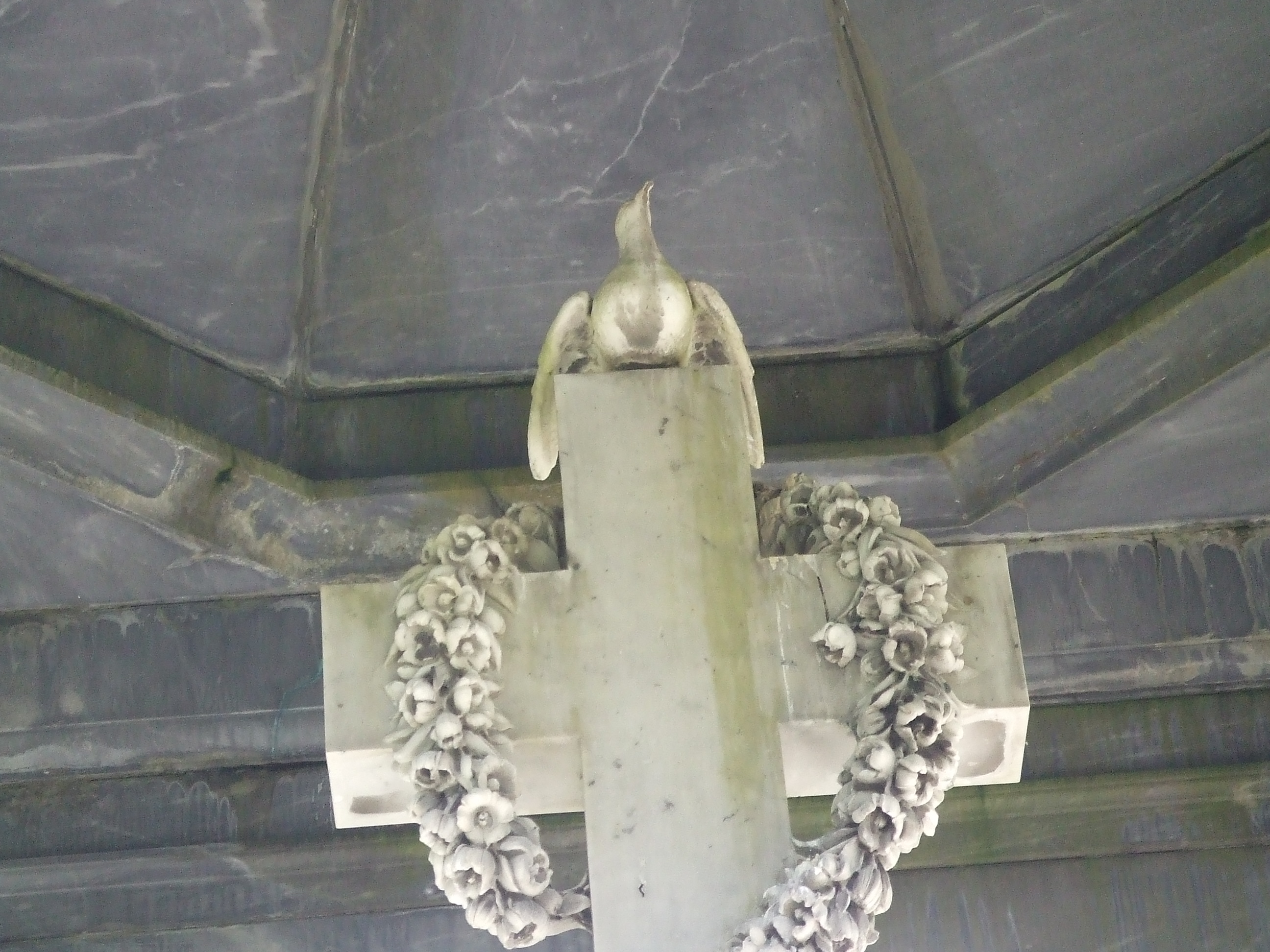
Poppy wreath in James Matheson's tomb in Lairg, Scotland

Parliament of the United Kingdom
Preceded by William Jardine	Member of Parliament for Ashburton; 1843 – 1847	Succeeded by Thomas Matheson
Preceded by Sir James Mackenzie	Member of Parliament for Ross and Cromarty; 1852–1868	Succeeded by Sir Alexander Matheson
Honorary titles
Preceded by Hugh Duncan Bailie	Lord Lieutenant of Ross-shire; 1866–1878	Succeeded by Duncan Davidson
Baronetage of the United Kingdom
New creation	Baronet (of The Lews); 1850–1878	Extinct
