= Ashburton (constituency) =

Former parliamentary constituency in the United Kingdom

- Former county constituency for the House of Commons
- County: Devon
- Major settlements: Ashburton

1885–1918
- Seats: One
- Created from: East Devon
- Replaced by: Parts of Totnes, South Molton and Tiverton

1640–1868
- Seats: Two (1640–1832); One (1832–1868)
- Type of constituency: Borough constituency
- Replaced by: East Devon

Ashburton (also known as Mid Devon) was a borough constituency represented in the House of Commons of the Parliament at Westminster, for the Parliaments of 1295 and 1407, and regularly from 1640 until it was abolished for the 1868 general election. It was one of three Devon borough constituencies newly enfranchised (or re-enfranchised after a gap of centuries) in the Long Parliament. It returned two Members of Parliament until the 1832 general election when the number was reduced to one MP.

From the 1885 general election Ashburton was revived as a county division of Devon. It returned one member until it was abolished from the 1918 general election.

== Boundaries ==
=== 1885-1918 ===
The Sessional Divisions of Crockernwell and Teignbridge.

== Members of Parliament ==
=== Ashburton borough 1398–1868 ===
- 1407 Richard Hurston, Walter Denys

Ashburton re-enfranchised by Parliament in Nov 1640

==== MPs 1640–1832 ====
Election	First member	First party	Second member	Second party
November 1640	Sir John Northcote	Parliamentarian	Sir Edmund Fowell	Parliamentarian
December 1648	Northcote and Fowell excluded in Pride's Purge – both seats vacant			
1653	Ashburton was unrepresented in the Barebones Parliament and the First and Second Parliaments of the Protectorate			
January 1659	Thomas Reynell		John Fowell	
May 1659	Not represented in the restored Rump			
April 1660	Sir William Courtenay		John Fowell	
1661	Sir George Sondes		John Fowell	
1677	William Stawell		Rawlin Mallock	
February 1679	William Stawell		Thomas Reynell	
September 1679	Richard Duke of Otterton		Thomas Reynell	
1681	William Stawell		Thomas Reynell	
1685	William Stawell		Edward Yarde	
1689	Sir Walter Yonge		Thomas Reynell	
1690	William Stawell		Sir Richard Reynell	
1695	William Stawell		Richard Duke of Otterton	
1701	William Stawell		Sir Thomas Lear	
1702	Richard Reynell		Sir Thomas Lear	
1705	Richard Reynell		Gilbert Yarde	
January 1708	Richard Reynell		Roger Tuckfield	Whig
May 1708	Robert Balle		Roger Tuckfield	Whig
1710	Richard Lloyd		Roger Tuckfield	Whig
March 1711	Richard Reynell		George Courtenay	
March 1711	Richard Reynell		Andrew Quick	
1713	Richard Reynell		Roger Tuckfield	Whig
1734	Sir William Yonge	Whig	Roger Tuckfield	Whig
1735	Thomas Bladen		Roger Tuckfield	Whig
1739	Thomas Bladen		Joseph Taylor	
1741	John Harris	Whig	John Arscott	
1754	John Harris	Whig	The Viscount Midleton	
1761	John Harris	Whig	Hon. Thomas Walpole	
1767	Robert Palk	Tory	Hon. Thomas Walpole	
1768	Laurence Sulivan	Tory	Charles Boone	Tory
1774	Robert Palk	Tory	Charles Boone	Tory
1784	Robert Palk	Tory	Robert Mackreth	Tory
1787	Lawrence Palk	Tory	Robert Mackreth	Tory
1796	Walter Palk	Tory	Robert Mackreth	Tory
1802	Walter Palk	Tory	Sir Hugh Inglis	Tory
1806	Walter Palk	Tory	Hon. Gilbert Elliot	Tory
1807	Walter Palk	Tory	Lord Charles Bentinck	Tory
1811	John Sullivan	Tory	Lord Charles Bentinck	Tory
1812	John Sullivan	Tory	Richard Preston	Tory
1818	Sir Lawrence Vaughan Palk	Tory	Sir John Copley	Tory
1826	Sir Lawrence Vaughan Palk	Tory	William Sturges Bourne	Tory
1830	Sir Lawrence Vaughan Palk	Tory	Charles Arbuthnot	Tory
February 1831	Sir Lawrence Vaughan Palk	Tory	William Stephen Poyntz	Whig
May 1831	Robert Torrens	Whig	William Stephen Poyntz	Whig
1832	Representation reduced to one Member			

==== MPs 1832–1868 ====
Election	Member	Party
1832	William Stephen Poyntz	Whig
1835	Charles Lushington	Whig
1841	William Jardine	Whig
1843 by-election	James Matheson	Whig
1847	Thomas Matheson	Whig
1852	George Moffatt	Radical
1859	John Harvey Astell	Conservative
1865	Robert Jardine	Liberal
1868	Constituency abolished	

=== Mid or Ashburton division of Devon 1885–1918 ===
Election	Member	Party
1885	Charles Seale-Hayne	Liberal
1904 by-election	Harry Eve	Liberal
1908 by-election	Ernest Morrison-Bell	Liberal Unionist
January 1910	Charles Buxton	Liberal
December 1910	Ernest Morrison-Bell	Conservative
1918	Constituency abolished	

== Elections ==
=== Elections in the 1830s ===
General election 1830: Ashburton
Party	Candidate	Votes	%	±%
Tory	Lawrence Vaughan Palk	Unopposed		
Tory	Charles Arbuthnot	Unopposed		
Tory hold				
Tory hold				

Arbuthnot resigned by accepting the office of Steward of the Chiltern Hundreds, causing a by-election.

By-election, 25 February 1831: Ashburton
Party	Candidate	Votes	%	±%
Whig	William Stephen Poyntz	Unopposed		
Whig gain from Tory				

General election 1831: Ashburton
Party	Candidate	Votes	%	±%
Whig	William Stephen Poyntz	74	45.7	N/A
Whig	Robert Torrens	47	29.0	N/A
Tory	Lawrence Vaughan Palk	41	25.3	N/A
Majority		6	3.7	N/A
Turnout		81 (est)	80.2 (est)	N/A
Registered electors		101		
Whig gain from Tory		Swing	N/A	
Whig gain from Tory		Swing	N/A	

General election 1832: Ashburton
Party	Candidate	Votes	%	±%
Whig	William Stephen Poyntz	Unopposed		
Registered electors		198		
Whig hold				

General election 1835: Ashburton
Party	Candidate	Votes	%	±%
Whig	Charles Lushington	89	55.6	N/A
Conservative	John Horsley Palmer	71	44.4	New
Majority		18	11.2	N/A
Turnout		160	84.2	N/A
Registered electors		190		
Whig hold		Swing	N/A	

General election 1837: Ashburton
Party	Candidate	Votes	%	±%
Whig	Charles Lushington	98	53.0	−2.6
Conservative	William John Utten Browne	87	47.0	+2.6
Majority		11	6.0	−5.2
Turnout		185	81.9	−2.3
Registered electors		226		
Whig hold		Swing	−2.6	

=== Elections in the 1840s ===
General election 1841: Ashburton
Party	Candidate	Votes	%	±%
Whig	William Jardine	Unopposed		
Registered electors		280		
Whig hold				

Jardine's death caused a by-election.

By-election, 8 March 1843: Ashburton
Party	Candidate	Votes	%	±%
Whig	James Matheson	141	59.5	N/A
Conservative	John Horsley Palmer	96	40.5	New
Majority		45	19.0	N/A
Turnout		237	87.8	N/A
Registered electors		270		
Whig hold		Swing	N/A	

General election 1847: Ashburton
Party	Candidate	Votes	%	±%
Whig	Thomas Matheson	Unopposed		
Registered electors		262		
Whig hold				

=== Elections in the 1850s ===
General election 1852: Ashburton
Party	Candidate	Votes	%	±%
Radical	George Moffatt	Unopposed		
Registered electors		236		
Radical gain from Whig				

General election 1857: Ashburton
Party	Candidate	Votes	%	±%
Radical	George Moffatt	Unopposed		
Registered electors		182		
Radical hold				

General election 1859: Ashburton
Party	Candidate	Votes	%	±%
Conservative	John Harvey Astell	91	50.3	New
Liberal	George Moffatt	90	49.7	N/A
Majority		1	0.6	N/A
Turnout		181	92.3	N/A
Registered electors		196		
Conservative gain from Liberal		Swing	N/A	

=== Elections in the 1860s ===
General election 1865: Ashburton
Party	Candidate	Votes	%	±%
Liberal	Robert Jardine	Unopposed		
Registered electors		350		
Liberal gain from Conservative				

=== Elections in the 1880s ===
Seale-Hayne

General election 1885: Ashburton
Party	Candidate	Votes	%	±%
Liberal	Charles Seale-Hayne	4,433	58.2	N/A
Conservative	William James Harris	3,182	41.8	New
Majority		1,251	16.4	N/A
Turnout		7,615	81.9	N/A
Registered electors		9,300		
Liberal win (new seat)				

Martin

General election 1886: Ashburton
Party	Candidate	Votes	%	±%
Liberal	Charles Seale-Hayne	3,413	53.2	−5.0
Liberal Unionist	Richard Martin	3,007	46.8	+5.0
Majority		406	6.4	−10.0
Turnout		6,420	69.0	−12.9
Registered electors		9,300		
Liberal hold		Swing	-5.0	

=== Elections in the 1890s ===
General election 1892: Ashburton
Party	Candidate	Votes	%	±%
Liberal	Charles Seale-Hayne	4,361	54.4	+1.2
Conservative	Charles Robert Collins	3,650	45.6	−1.2
Majority		711	8.8	+2.4
Turnout		8,011	85.3	+16.3
Registered electors		9,392		
Liberal hold		Swing	+1.2	

General election 1895: Ashburton
Party	Candidate	Votes	%	±%
Liberal	Charles Seale-Hayne	4,380	52.4	−2.0
Conservative	John A Nix	3,976	47.6	+2.0
Majority		4,004	4.8	−4.0
Turnout		8,356	85.9	+0.6
Registered electors		9,726		
Liberal hold		Swing	-2.0	

=== Elections in the 1900s ===
General election 1900: Ashburton
Party	Candidate	Votes	%	±%
Liberal	Charles Seale-Hayne	4,487	54.7	+2.3
Conservative	John A Nix	3,716	45.3	−2.3
Majority		771	9.4	+4.6
Turnout		8,203	83.9	−2.0
Registered electors		9,777		
Liberal hold		Swing	+2.3	

Eve

1904 Ashburton by-election
Party	Candidate	Votes	%	±%
Liberal	Harry Eve	5,034	58.6	+3.9
Conservative	Richard Harrison	3,558	41.4	−3.9
Majority		1,476	17.2	+7.8
Turnout		8,592	85.1	+1.2
Registered electors		10,097		
Liberal hold		Swing	+3.9	

General election 1906: Ashburton
Party	Candidate	Votes	%	±%
Liberal	Harry Eve	5,079	57.3	+2.6
Conservative	Ernest Morrison-Bell	3,790	42.7	−2.6
Majority		1,289	14.6	+5.2
Turnout		8,869	85.0	+1.1
Registered electors		10,429		
Liberal hold		Swing	+2.6	

1908 Ashburton by-election
Party	Candidate	Votes	%	±%
Conservative	Ernest Morrison-Bell	5,191	52.8	+10.1
Liberal	Charles Buxton	4,632	47.2	−10.1
Majority		559	5.6	N/A
Turnout		9,823	89.5	+4.5
Registered electors		10,976		
Conservative gain from Liberal		Swing	+10.1	

=== Elections in the 1910s ===
Buxton

General election January 1910: Ashburton
Party	Candidate	Votes	%	±%
Liberal	Charles Buxton	5,668	51.1	+3.9
Conservative	Ernest Morrison-Bell	5,421	48.9	−3.9
Majority		247	2.2	−3.4
Turnout		11,089	92.6	+3.1
Liberal hold		Swing	+3.9	

General election December 1910: Ashburton
Party	Candidate	Votes	%	±%
Conservative	Ernest Morrison-Bell	5,579	51.6	+2.7
Liberal	Charles Buxton	5,225	48.4	−2.7
Majority		354	3.2	N/A
Turnout		10,804	90.2	−2.4
Conservative gain from Liberal		Swing	+2.7	

General Election 1914–15:

Another General Election was required to take place before the end of 1915. The political parties had been making preparations for an election to take place and by July 1914, the following candidates had been selected;

- Unionist: Ernest Morrison-Bell
- Liberal:
