= John Gould (MP) =

English politician

John Gould (c.1695–1740), of Woodford, Essex, and Bovingdon, Hertfordshire, was a British politician who sat in the House of Commons from 1729 to 1734.

Gould was the eldest son of John Gould of Woodford, Essex, director and chairman of the East India Company and his wife Rachel Gelsthorp, daughter of Peter Gelsthorp, apothecary of London. He became a director of the East India Company in 1724 and on 21 August 1724, married Mary Bulkeley, daughter of William Bulkeley of Plaistow, Essex'. In 1728 he succeeded his uncle, Sir Nathaniel Gould.

Gould was returned as Member of Parliament (MP) for Shoreham at a by-election on 29 January 1729. He stood again at the 1734 British general election with the support of Walpole, but came bottom of the poll.

Gould relinquished his post as Director of the East India Company in 1735 and in 1736 was appointed to the post of Inspector of outport customs accounts, which was worth £400 a year. He also succeeded his father in 1736. He died on 25 August 1740 leaving two sons. His younger brother was Nathaniel Gould, MP for Wareham.

Parliament of Great Britain
Preceded by Francis Chamberlayne; Sir Nathaniel Gould	Member of Parliament for New Shoreham; 1729–1734; With: Samuel Ongley	Succeeded by Thomas Frederick; John Phillipson
