= Harry Eve =

English barrister, judge and politician

The Right Honourable Sir Harry Eve
- Harry Eve, 1904

Member of Parliament for Ashburton
- In office 1904-1908

Personal details
- Born: 13 October 1856 London, England
- Died: 10 December 1940 (aged 84) Farnham, Surrey, England
- Political party: Liberal Party
- Spouse: Beatrice Hounsell (m. 1879)
- Children: 3
- Education: Exeter College, Oxford

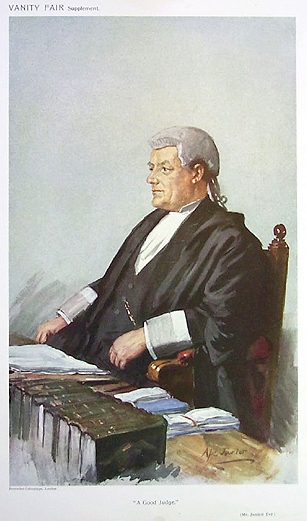
"A Good Judge" The Hon Mr Justice Eve as caricatured in Vanity Fair, March 1911

Sir Harry Trelawney Eve (13 October 1856 – 10 December 1940) was an English barrister, judge and Liberal Party politician.

== Family and education ==
Harry Trelawney Eve was born in London. He was the only son of Thomas Eve, a Jamaica merchant. He was educated privately and at Exeter College, Oxford where he gained his BA degree in 1876 and his MA in 1883.

On 24 June 1879, Eve married Beatrice Wright, daughter of Henry Strangways Hounsell, a medical doctor from Torquay. They moved to Crouch End, initially occupying Holne House on Totteham Lane, before moving to Hermiston on Middle Lane. By 1911, they had moved to West Kensington. They had one son (who was killed in action in 1917) and two daughters.

Harry Trelawney Eve was building "Forder Gardens" in South Devon for his son, when he died in action. The house was left incomplete, with only the walls and Gate houses left behind.

== Career ==
Eve went in for the law. He was called to the bar at Lincoln's Inn in 1881, practised at the Chancery Bar and took silk in 1895. He became a bencher of Lincoln's Inn in 1899. In 1907 he was appointed to be a judge in the Chancery Division and he served in that capacity until 1937 when he retired. He was asked to sit in the Court of Appeal on many occasions but was never promoted to sit there permanently.

Eve was also a farmer. He owned land in Devon and farmed it professionally. He was particularly interested in the breeding of South Devon cattle. He listed farming as a recreation in Who's Who and was member of the Farming Club.

Eve had other business and financial interests too. In 1907 he was elected as a director of the Equitable Life Assurance Society.

== Politics ==
In 1904, Eve accepted the invitation of the Liberal Party in Ashburton in Devon to become their candidate in the by-election caused by the death of the sitting Liberal MP, Charles Seale-Hayne. He won the seat and represented Ashburton until 1907 when he resigned to take up his appointment as a judge.

== Other appointments and honours ==
Eve was made a Justice of the Peace for the county of Devon in 1903. In 1907 he was elected an honorary fellow of Exeter College, Oxford, and was knighted in the same year. He retired from the bench in 1937 for reasons of declining health and was sworn in as a member of the Privy Council.

== Death ==
Eve died at Eldon House, Lower Bourne, Farnham, Surrey, on 10 December 1940, aged 84.

Parliament of the United Kingdom
Preceded by Charles Seale-Hayne	Member of Parliament for Ashburton; 1904 – 1907	Succeeded by Ernest Morrison-Bell
