= James Sheppard (MP) =

British lawyer & politician (c.1861–1730)

Sir James Sheppard (c. 1681–1730), of Watton Court, Honiton, and Lawell, Chudleigh, Devon, was a British lawyer and politician who sat in the House of Commons between 1711 and 1730.

Sheppard was the eldest son of James Sheppard of Honiton, attorney-at-law and his wife Mary Walrond of Payhembury, near Honiton. He was admitted at the Middle Temple in 1700 and called to the bar in 1705. By licence dated 16 March 1704, he married Elizabeth Fowler. He was appointed as Recorder of Honiton in 1713 and was a serjeant-at-law from 1724 to his death.

At the 1710 British general election, Sheppard stood for Parliament as a Tory at Honiton but was caught up in a double return. He was declared elected as Member of Parliament (MP) on 17 February 1711. He was listed as one of the ‘worthy patriots’ who detected the mismanagements of the previous ministry and was a member of the October Club. He supported the French commerce bill on 18 June 1713. He was returned again at the 1713 British general election, but was defeated in 1715.

Sheppard was unsuccessful again at the 1722 general election, but was returned as a Whig after a hard contest, at the 1727 British general election. He was knighted 14 May 1729. He voted with the Administration on the civil list in 1729 and the Hessians in 1730.

Sheppard succumbed to gaol fever, and died on 10 April 1730, aged 49. He had several sons and daughters, but many predeceased him. The monument to Sheppard erected in Honiton Church, with his bust, was destroyed in a fire in March 1911, but the panel with the inscription was preserved and is now on the south wall of the church.

Parliament of Great Britain
Preceded by Sir William Drake; Sir Walter Yonge	Member of Parliament for Honiton; 1711–1715; With: Sir William Drake	Succeeded by Sir William Courtenay; Sir William Yonge
Preceded by Sir William Pole; Sir William Yonge	Member of Parliament for Honiton; 1727– 1730; With: Sir William Yonge	Succeeded by Sir William Pole; Sir William Yonge
