= Charles Lushington (1785–1866) =

British Whig politician

Member of Parliament for Westminster
- In office 30 July 1847 – 9 July 1852 Serving with De Lacy Evans
- Preceded by: John Temple Leader; De Lacy Evans
- Succeeded by: John Shelley; De Lacy Evans

Member of Parliament for Ashburton
- In office 5 January 1835 – 30 June 1841
- Preceded by: William Stephen Poyntz
- Succeeded by: William Jardine

Personal details
- Born: 14 April 1785
- Died: 23 September 1866 (aged 81) Brighton, Sussex, England
- Party: Whig

Charles Lushington (14 April 1785 – 23 September 1866) was a British Whig politician, and servant for the East India Company, and secretary to the Bengal Presidency.

Lushington was the younger brother of Stephen Lushington, a British judge and Whig Member of Parliament (MP) for various constituencies between 1806 and 1841. In 1805, he married Sarah, daughter of General Joseph Gascoyne. After her death in 1839, he married Julia Jane née Lane, widow of Thomas Teed, in 1844.

Lushington first became a Whig MP for Ashburton at the 1835 general election, and held the seat until the 1841 general election, when he did not seek re-election. He returned, however, six years later, for Westminster at the 1847 general election and held the seat until the next general election in 1852, when he did not seek re-election. During his time in Parliament, Lushington was a reformer, favouring the use of a secret ballot, triennial parliaments, and extension of the suffrage. He also opposed religious privileges, publishing three works on religious questions.

Lushington died in Brighton, Sussex in 1866.

Parliament of the United Kingdom
Preceded by William Stephen Poyntz	Member of Parliament for Ashburton; 1835–1841	Succeeded by William Jardine
Preceded by John Temple Leader; De Lacy Evans	Member of Parliament for Westminster; 1847–1852; With: De Lacy Evans	Succeeded by De Lacy Evans; John Shelley
