= Ernest Morrison-Bell =

British soldier and parliamentarian (1870–1960)

Lieutenant-Colonel Ernest Fitzroy Morrison-Bell, OBE, JP, DL (19 April 1871 – 20 October 1960) was a British soldier and parliamentarian.

== Family and education ==
He was born Ernest Fitzroy Morrison, the son of Sir Charles William Morrison, 1st Baronet and Louisa Maria Dawes, daughter of William Henry Dawes. In 1905, the family adopted the surname Morrison-Bell by royal licence for his father's mother, Mary Wilhelmina Morrison, daughter and heiress of John Morrison of the Royal Navy. His elder brother was Sir Clive Morrison-Bell.

Ernest was educated at Eton College.

== Military career ==
Morrison joined the 9th Lancers as a second lieutenant on 5 December 1891, and was promoted to lieutenant on 5 September 1894. He was adjutant of his regiment from 20 April 1898 until 20 April 1902, during which the regiment served in the Second Boer War, and he was promoted captain on 1 January 1901 while in South Africa. For his service in the war, he was mentioned in despatches by Lord Kitchener in his final despatch dated 23 June 1902.

== Political career ==
Morrison-Bell was the Liberal Unionist Party candidate for Ashburton at the 1906 General Election. He was elected at the 1908 Ashburton by-election but lost the seat in the January 1910 General Election. He regained the seat at the December 1910 General Election. The seat was abolished in 1918 and he did not contest the election.

== Personal life ==
He married Maud Evelyn, daughter of Lt. Col. Francis Henry. Their granddaughter Susan is the Duchess of Richmond, having married Charles Gordon-Lennox, 10th Duke of Richmond.

Parliament of the United Kingdom
Preceded by Harry Eve	Member of Parliament for Ashburton; 1908–Jan 1910	Succeeded by Charles Buxton
Preceded by Charles Buxton	Member of Parliament for Ashburton; Dec 1910–1918	Constituency abolished
