= Richard Duke (1652–1733) =

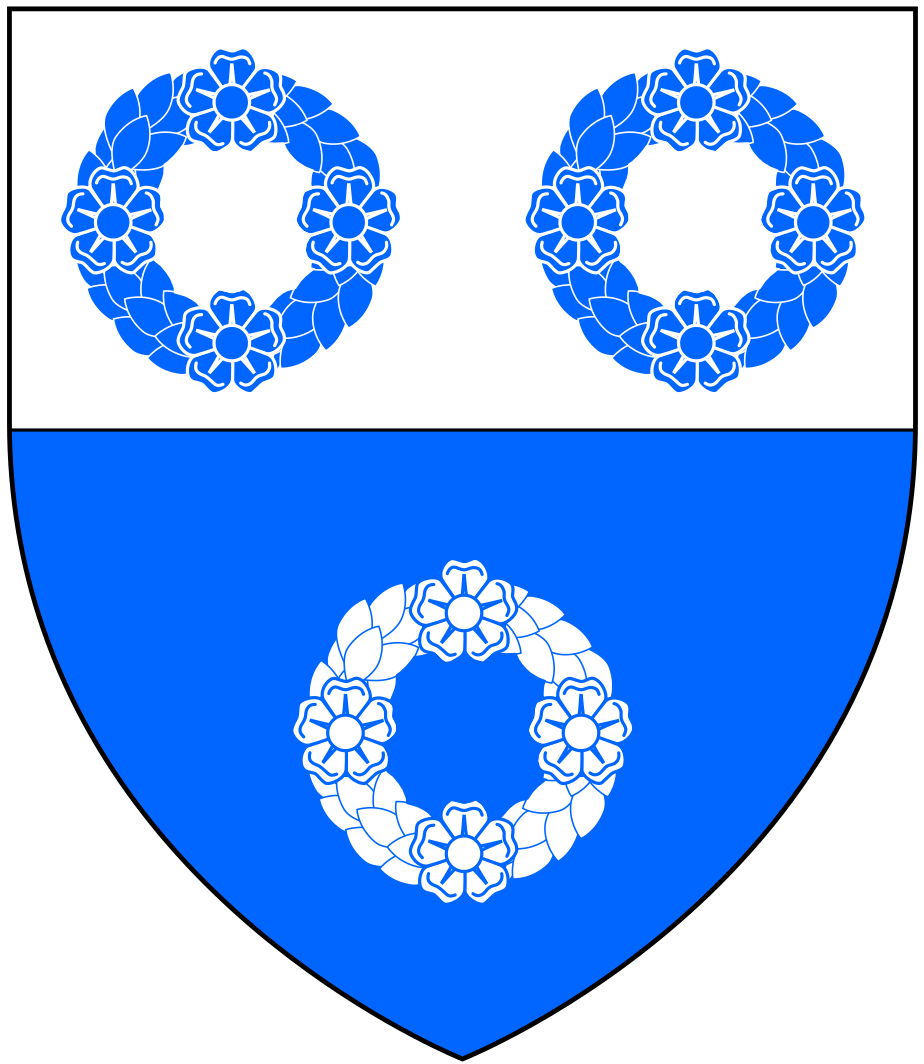
Arms of Duke family of Otterton: Per fesse argent and azure, three chaplets counterchanged

Richard VI Duke (1652–1733) lord of the manor of Otterton, Devon, was four times MP for Ashburton, 1679, 1695, 1698 and 1701.

== Origins ==
He was the son and heir of Richard V Duke (d. 1716) of Otterton by his wife Frances Southcott, daughter of George Southcote of Buckland-Tout-Saints.

== Marriages and progeny ==
He married twice:

- Firstly to Isabella Yonge, daughter of Sir Walter Yonge, 2nd Baronet (c. 1625–1670), of Colyton, MP, by whom he had an only daughter and heir presumptive Elizabeth Duke (d. 1716), whose marriage was arranged in 1705 to Robert Rolle (c. 1677–1710), MP for Callington (twice in 1701) and for Devon (1702–1710), heir apparent to his grandfather Sir John Rolle (1626–1706), KB, of Stevenstone and Bicton, Devon. This was destined to be a great dynastic marriage which would have combined two of the largest estates in Devon, yet the marriage was without progeny and thus the plan failed. The Rolle estate of Bicton was adjacent to Otterton, and thus the combination of the two would be advantageous from the administrative viewpoint. The Rolles did not however give up their desire to obtain Otterton, and further dynastic alliances (also failed) were arranged between the two families. The Rolle desire was fulfilled in 1786 when Denys Rolle (1725–1797) purchased for the huge sum of £72,000 the manor of Otterton, with several other manors, from the heirs of his brother-in-law the last Robert Duke (d. 1741) of Otterton, who had married his sister Isabella Charlotte Rolle, which marriage was without issue.
- Secondly he married Elizabeth Cholwich, daughter of John Cholwich of Farringdon, by whom he had two children who died as infants:
  - Frances Duke (1707–1711)
  - Robert Duke (1712–1714)

== Death and succession ==
He died in 1733 without surviving progeny. By his will his heir became Richard VII Duke (1688–1740) of Otterton, his second cousin once removed, the second son of Richard Duke (born 1653) by his wife Isabella, the son and heir of Richard Duke (born 1627), the son and heir of Robert Duke (1600–1665), the younger brother of Richard IV Duke (1600–1653) of Otterton.

== Sources ==
- Ferris, John. P., Biography of Duke, Richard (1652-1733), of Otterton, Devon, Published in The History of Parliament: the House of Commons 1660-1690, ed. B.D. Henning, 1983
- Vivian, Lt.Col. J. L., (Ed.) The Visitations of the County of Devon: Comprising the Heralds' Visitations of 1531, 1564 & 1620, Exeter, 1895, pp. 311–314, pedigree of Duke of Otterton
