= 1908 Ashburton by-election =

UK parliamentary by-election

- 17 January 1908

Candidate	Bell	Buxton
Party	Liberal Unionist	Liberal
Popular vote	5,191	4,632
Percentage	52.8%	47.2%
MP before election
Harry Trelawney Eve
Liberal
Subsequent MP
Ernest Morrison-Bell
Liberal Unionist

The 1908 Ashburton by-election was a by-election held in England on 17 January 1908 to elect a new Member of Parliament (MP) for the British House of Commons constituency of Ashburton in Devon.

== Vacancy ==
The by-election was triggered by the appointment of the sitting Liberal MP Harry Trelawney Eve as a judge.

== History ==
Eve

General election 1906: Ashburton
Party	Candidate	Votes	%	±%
Liberal	Harry Eve	5,079	57.3	+2.6
Liberal Unionist	Ernest Morrison-Bell	3,790	42.7	−2.6
Majority		1,289	14.6	+5.2
Turnout		8,869	85.0	+1.1
Registered electors		10,429		
Liberal hold		Swing	+2.6	

== Candidates ==
The Liberal Unionist candidate Ernest Morrison-Bell, had lost the constituency by 1,283 votes in the previous general election.

== Campaign ==
The Liberal government had introduced the Small Holdings and Allotments Act 1907 (7 Edw. 7. c. 54) which sought to limit the degree to which fixtures and improvements remained the property of landlords, and to increase the number of small farmers. This new measure was expected to have a strong appeal to voters in rural constituencies like Ashburton.

== Result ==
The result was a victory for the Liberal Unionist candidate Ernest Morrison-Bell.

Ashburton by-election, 1908
Party	Candidate	Votes	%	±%
Liberal Unionist	Ernest Morrison-Bell	5,191	52.8	+10.1
Liberal	Charles Buxton	4,632	47.2	−10.1
Majority		559	5.6	N/A
Turnout		9,823	89.5	+4.5
Registered electors		10,976		
Liberal Unionist gain from Liberal		Swing	+10.1	

The loss of the seat came as a surprise to the Liberals, who had expected to retain it. The unsuccessful Liberal Candidate, Charles Roden Buxton, complained that the Liberal government had wrongly been blamed for the increased price of food; Morrison-Bell assured his followers that it had been a great victory for the cause of tariff reform. A crowd of over 10,000 people gathered in the town centre to hear the result, and after it was announced, several fights broke out, with Liberal supporters accusing their opponents of having won through 'beer' and 'bribery'. Morrison-Bell had to be escorted to the Conservative Club by the police, and Emmeline Pankhurst and another supporter of the women's suffrage movement were knocked down and injured in a shop in which they had taken refuge. A crowd later invaded the Conservative Club, causing considerable damage, and the police had to charge with truncheons, leaving several people in need of medical treatment. A number of policemen were injured by stones and one was hospitalised.

== Aftermath ==
Buxton

General election January 1910: Ashburton
Party	Candidate	Votes	%	±%
Liberal	Charles Buxton	5,668	51.1	+3.9
Liberal Unionist	Ernest Morrison-Bell	5,421	48.9	−3.9
Majority		247	2.2	N/A
Turnout		11,089	92.6	+3.1
Liberal gain from Liberal Unionist		Swing	+3.9	

== See also ==
- List of United Kingdom by-elections
- Ashburton constituency
- 1904 Ashburton by-election
