= Page baronets =

- Escutcheon of the Page baronets of Greenwich
- Creation date: 1714
- Status: extinct
- Extinction date: 1775

The Page baronetcy of Greenwich, Kent, was a title in the Baronetage of Great Britain. It was created on 3 December 1714 during the reign of King George I of Great Britain for wealthy London merchant and Member of Parliament, Gregory Page. Three successive generations of the same family were each named Gregory Page: the first baronet's father, who was also a merchant in London, and the first and second baronets. The baronetcy became extinct on the death of the childless second baronet in 1775.

== Page baronets, of Greenwich, Kent (1714) ==
- Sir Gregory Page, 1st Baronet (c. 1669 – 25 May 1720)
- Sir Gregory Page, 2nd Baronet (c. 1695 – 4 August 1775)

== See also ==
- Page Wood baronets

Baronetage of Great Britain
Preceded by Smyth baronets	Page baronets of Greenwich; 3 December 1714	Succeeded by Fryer baronets
