= Sir Gregory Page, 2nd Baronet =

English art collector and landowner

Sir Gregory Page, 2nd Baronet (c. 1695 – 4 August 1775), was an English art collector and landowner, and a baronet in the Baronetage of Great Britain.

He was the eldest son of Sir Gregory Page, 1st Baronet, and his wife Mary, the daughter of Londoner Thomas Trotman. He followed his father in becoming a director of the East India Company, and from 1717 began expanding his land holdings in Kent and London. He succeeded to his father's baronetcy on 25 May 1720. He married on 26 May 1721 Martha, third daughter of Robert Kenward, of Kenwards in Yalding, Kent. They had no children. She died on 30 September 1767 and was buried 7 days later at Greenwich.

He inherited a substantial holding of stock in the South Sea Company. This was sold just before the "South Sea Bubble" collapsed in 1720. Page invested part of his fortune into further property, particularly in what was then north-west Kent. In 1723, he built a manor house in the Westcombe Park area, just north of Blackheath, but later preferred to live in a huge mansion at Wricklemarsh nearby. This was designed by architect John James, built for £90,000, and stood in a 250 acres (100 ha) park, once the property of Sir John Morden. A ground plan and cross-section through the mansion's rooms were included in Vitruvius Britannicus in 1739, and according to a contemporary description, Wricklemarsh was:

"one of the finest houses in England, resembling a royal palace rather than a residence of a private gentleman. The gardens are laid out in the most elegant manner and both the paintings and furniture are surprisingly fine. All rooms are hung with green or crimson silk damask and the cornices, door-cases and chair-frames are all carved and gilt. The chimney pieces are all of fine polished marble."

The surrounding land later formed part of the Blackheath Park housing estate created by John Cator, after he purchased, stripped and eventually demolished Wricklemarsh between 1783 and 1800. Page's other property investments included the purchase of Battlesden Manor in Bedfordshire from Lord Bathurst in 1724. In 1733, for £19,000, Page bought the dilapidated Elizabethan manor house at Well Hall Place, Eltham, demolishing it to build a new mansion home, Page House (eventually demolished in 1931).

Page's fields of interest were said by the Dictionary of National Biography to include "scholarship and languages, engineering, construction, naval architecture and surveying, collecting and building". The Wricklemarsh mansion was lavishly furnished and housed Page's art collection, which included works by Rubens, van Dyck, Claude, Poussin, Veronese, Salvator Rosa, Nicolaes Berchem, and Adriaen van der Werff. Sir John Soane's Museum boasts eight Dutch East India Company wood chairs inlaid with the coat of arms of Page and Kenward in mother of pearl. Page founded and patronised the Free and Easy Society, a dining club for gentlemen, for which Qianlong era Chinese armorial punch-bowls were made c. 1755.

He supported the creation of a new charity in London called the Foundling Hospital. In its Royal charter, issued in 1739, he is listed as one of the original governors. The charity worked to save abandoned children from the streets of the capital.

Upon his death in 1775, Page's fortune was bequeathed to his great-nephew Sir Gregory Turner, 3rd Baronet of Ambrosden, Oxfordshire, who added 'Page' to his surname to become Sir Gregory Page-Turner. Page-Turner was the grandson of Page's sister Mary by her husband Sir Edward Turner, 1st Baronet.

Page was interred in the family vault at St Alfege's Church, Greenwich, on 14 August 1775.

The Page Estate in Blackheath is named after him.

Baronetage of Great Britain
| Preceded by Gregory Page | Baronet (of Greenwich); 1720–1776 | Extinct |
