= 1904 Ashburton by-election =

UK parliamentary by-election

- 7 January 1904

Candidate	Eve	Harrison
Party	Liberal	Conservative
Popular vote	5,034	3,558
Percentage	58.6%	41.4%
MP before election
Charles Seale-Hayne
Liberal
Subsequent MP
Harry Trelawney Eve
Liberal

The 1904 Ashburton by-election was a parliamentary by-election held in England on 7 January 1904 to elect a new Member of Parliament (MP) for the British House of Commons constituency of Ashburton in Devon. It was triggered by the death of the sitting Liberal Party MP Charles Seale-Hayne.

The election was contested by the Conservative and Liberal parties and won by the Liberal candidate, Harry Trelawney Eve, with a majority of 1,476 votes.

== Vacancy ==
The by-election was caused by the death on 22 November 1903 of the sitting Liberal Party MP Charles Seale-Hayne, who had held the seat since the 1885 general election.

== Candidates ==
=== Liberals ===
The Liberals adopted Harry Trelawney Eve KC, a 57-year-old barrister who practised at the Chancery Bar. Eve had connections with Devon. He owned land in the county at Yarner Wood near Bovey Tracey and farmed it professionally, taking a particular interest in the breeding of South Devon cattle. He was appointed a Justice of the Peace for the county in 1903 and his wife came from Torquay. He identified himself as a Radical and a supporter of Free Trade.

=== Conservatives ===
The Conservative candidate was Sir Richard Harrison, a recently retired professional soldier, educated at Harrow School. Sir Richard was aged 66 years, had a home in Brixham and owned a farm in Hampshire.

== Issues ==
=== Trade ===
Eve, having from the outset adopted the traditional Liberal stance as a Free Trader, made the most of this position to attack government policy on tariff reform and to warn that this would lead to taxes on food. Harrison supported the government line, arguing that this was the only effective way to deal with the unfair competition to which British industry and trade were being subjected by foreign countries and that it would maintain a strong home manufacturing base to guarantee full employment. Harrison received a letter of support from Joseph Chamberlain arguing that agriculture was one of the industries which had suffered most from unrestricted imports and contending that tariff reform proposals would not add a penny to the cost of living while helping farmers and allotment holders. It was reported that the arguments concerning cheap food found most resonance among the town-dwellers of the constituency and the agricultural labourers, a traditional source of strength for the Liberal Party in the area. The attempts of the Tariff Reform League to hold a public meeting in Newton Abbott during the election campaign proved a bit of a disaster. The meeting was first disrupted by about a hundred Radicals singing political songs, causing the speakers to delay but then a fight broke out in the hall and the meeting had to be abandoned for fear of violence to the speakers. Once the speakers had withdrawn the fighting got worse and a lot of damage was done. However The Times reported that Newton Abbott had a reputation for rowdyism at times of political excitement and the incident was unlikely to affect the outcome of the election but it did note that the future meeting of the Tariff Reform League had been postponed.

=== Education ===
The Education Act 1902 provided Eve with a campaigning issue to appeal to his traditional supporters. The Act handed over responsibility for education from local school boards to borough or county education authorities. The Act also brought voluntary schools under some control of the government, giving them funding. The nonconformist and dissenting religionists, who were by and large Liberal supporters, resented this funding of Anglican and Roman Catholic church schools from the general rates. ‘No Rome on the Rates’ was the rallying cry. Eve raised this subject early in the election campaign, at his adoption meeting, realising its resonance for committed Liberals and their traditional constituency of nonconformist church and chapel-goers. The Liberals also hoped to pick up votes from Conservative nonconformists. Harrison took a neutral line on the 1902 Act. He said it had been controversial but was now law and should be given a complete and fair trial, while being monitored for discrimination against particular religious groups.

=== The Armed Forces ===
In the aftermath of the Boer Wars and given his own military background it was not surprising that Harrison felt comfortable dealing with issues around the armed forces. He supported the proposals being contemplated to reform the administration of the War Office and he favoured the introduction of a comprehensive scheme to improve the strength, efficiency and organisation of all Britain's military – particularly the navy. These measures were the subject of Royal Commissions established in 1902. The Esher and Norfolk Committees eventually bore fruit in certain reforms brought in by the Conservative Hugh Arnold-Foster in 1904-05 but ironically major reform had to wait until the new Liberal government of December 1905 and the implementation of the Haldane Reforms.

== Result ==
Eve held Ashburton for the Liberals with a majority of 1,476. The size of the majority was larger than expected, doubling Seale-Hayne's majority at the 1900 general election. The Times commented that the government clearly needed to do more in agricultural constituencies to persuade voters of the value of protectionism. The fact was that the Conservative government re-elected in 1900 and which first came to office in 1895 was by now appearing stale and weary to the electorate. The government would in the year following the by-election give up the ghost and allow the creation of a Liberal administration in December 1905, an administration which would go on in the general election of January–February 1906 to secure a landslide mandate from the electorate. In the sixty by-elections between 1895 and 1905 the Liberal poll went up, overall, by 30% and the Unionist poll went down by 7%. That trend had gathered momentum since 1902, the year of the Education Act and the imposition of a tax on corn – the two major campaign issues of the Ashburton by-election.

Eve retained his seat at the 1906 general election with a majority of 1,289. He resigned the seat in 1907 to become a judge in the Chancery Division.

Eve

Ashburton by-election, 1904
Party	Candidate	Votes	%	±%
Liberal	Harry Trelawney Eve	5,034	58.6	+3.9
Conservative	Richard Harrison	3,558	41.4	−3.9
Majority		1,476	17.2	+7.8
Turnout		8,592	85.1	+1.2
Liberal hold		Swing	+3.9	

== See also ==
- List of United Kingdom by-elections
- United Kingdom by-election records
- 1908 Ashburton by-election
