= John Harris (courtier) =

British courtier and politician

Member of Parliament for Helston
- In office 1727–1741

Member of Parliament for Ashburton
- In office 1741–1767

Master of the Household to George II and III
- In office 1741–1767

Personal details
- Born: c. 1690
- Died: October 5, 1767
- Parent: William Harris
- Relatives: Christopher Harris (brother)
- Occupation: Courtier and politician

John Harris (c. 1690 – 5 October 1767) was a British courtier and Whig politician who sat in the House of Commons for forty years from 1727 to 1767.

He was a Member of Parliament for Helston from 1727 and then sat for Ashburton from 1741 to 1767. From 1741 he also held the post of Master of the Household to George II and III.

Harris was the second son of William Harris. His elder brother, Christopher Harris, was MP for Okehampton.

Parliament of Great Britain
Preceded by Walter Carey	Member of Parliament for Helston; 1727–1741; With: John Evelyn	Succeeded by Thomas Walker
Preceded by Thomas Bladen; Joseph Taylor	Member of Parliament for Ashburton; 1741–1767; With: John Arscott 1741–1754; The Viscount Midleton 1754–1761; Thomas Walpole from 1761	Succeeded by Robert Palk; Thomas Walpole
Court offices
Preceded by George Treby	Master of the Household; 1741–1767	Succeeded by Henry Carteret
