= Francis Chamberlayne =

English politician

Francis Chamberlayne (after 1667–1728), of Stoneythorpe, Warwickshire and London, was an English politician who sat in the House of Commons between 1713 and 1728.

Chamberlayne was the son of Francis Chamberlayne, a London grocer, whom he succeeded in 1695, inheriting Stoney Thorpe Hall (or Stoneythorpe Hall) near Southam, Warwickshire. The Chamberlaynes were originally a Warwickshire family.

Chamberlayn was a Member (MP) of the Parliament of Great Britain for New Shoreham 1713 - 1715 and 11 June 1720 – 26 September 1728.

Chamberlayn died unmarried in 1728.

Parliament of Great Britain
Preceded by Sir Gregory Page (Sir) Nathaniel Gould	Member of Parliament for New Shoreham; 1713–1715; With: (Sir) Nathaniel Gould	Succeeded by Sir Gregory Page (Sir) Nathaniel Gould
Preceded by Sir Gregory Page (Sir) Nathaniel Gould	Member of Parliament for New Shoreham; 1720–1728; With: (Sir) Nathaniel Gould	Succeeded by Samuel Ongley; John Gould
