= Dudley Ryder (judge) =

British lawyer, writer and politician

The Right Honourable Sir Dudley Ryder PC
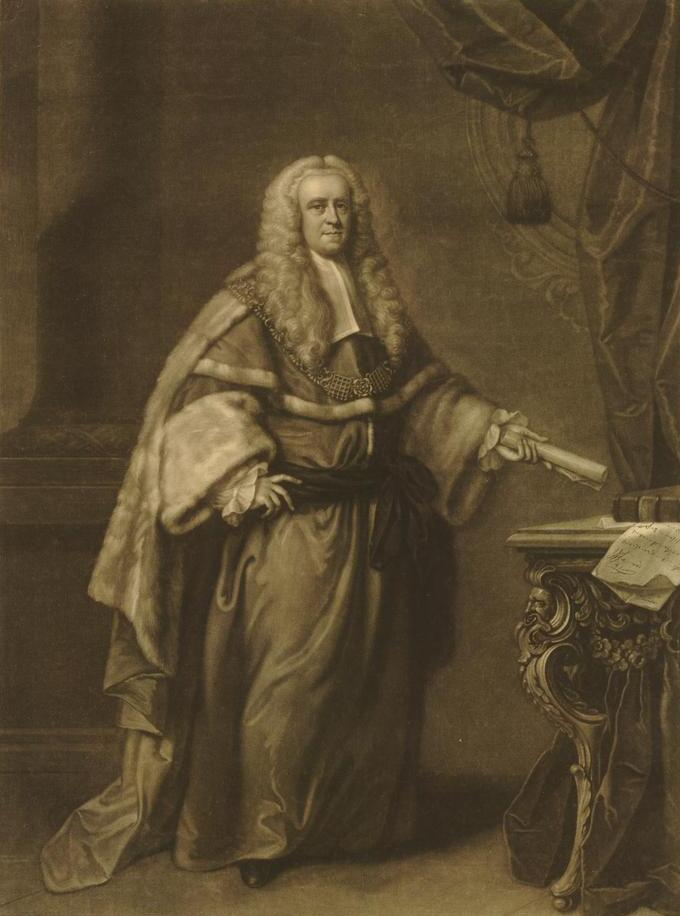

Solicitor General
- In office 1733–1737
- Monarch: George II
- Prime Minister: Robert Walpole
- Preceded by: Charles Talbot
- Succeeded by: Sir John Strange

Attorney General
- In office 1737–1754
- Monarch: George II
- Prime Minister: Robert Walpole; the Earl of Wilmington; Henry Pelham
- Preceded by: Sir John Willes
- Succeeded by: William Murray

Lord Chief Justice of the King's Bench
- In office 1754–1756
- Monarch: George II
- Prime Minister: The Duke of Newcastle
- Preceded by: Sir William Lee
- Succeeded by: William Murray

Personal details
- Born: 4 November 1691 London, England
- Died: 25 May 1756 (aged 64) London, England
- Spouse: Anne Newnham
- Children: Nathaniel Ryder
- Parent(s): Richard Ryder; Elizabeth Marshall
- Education: University of Edinburgh

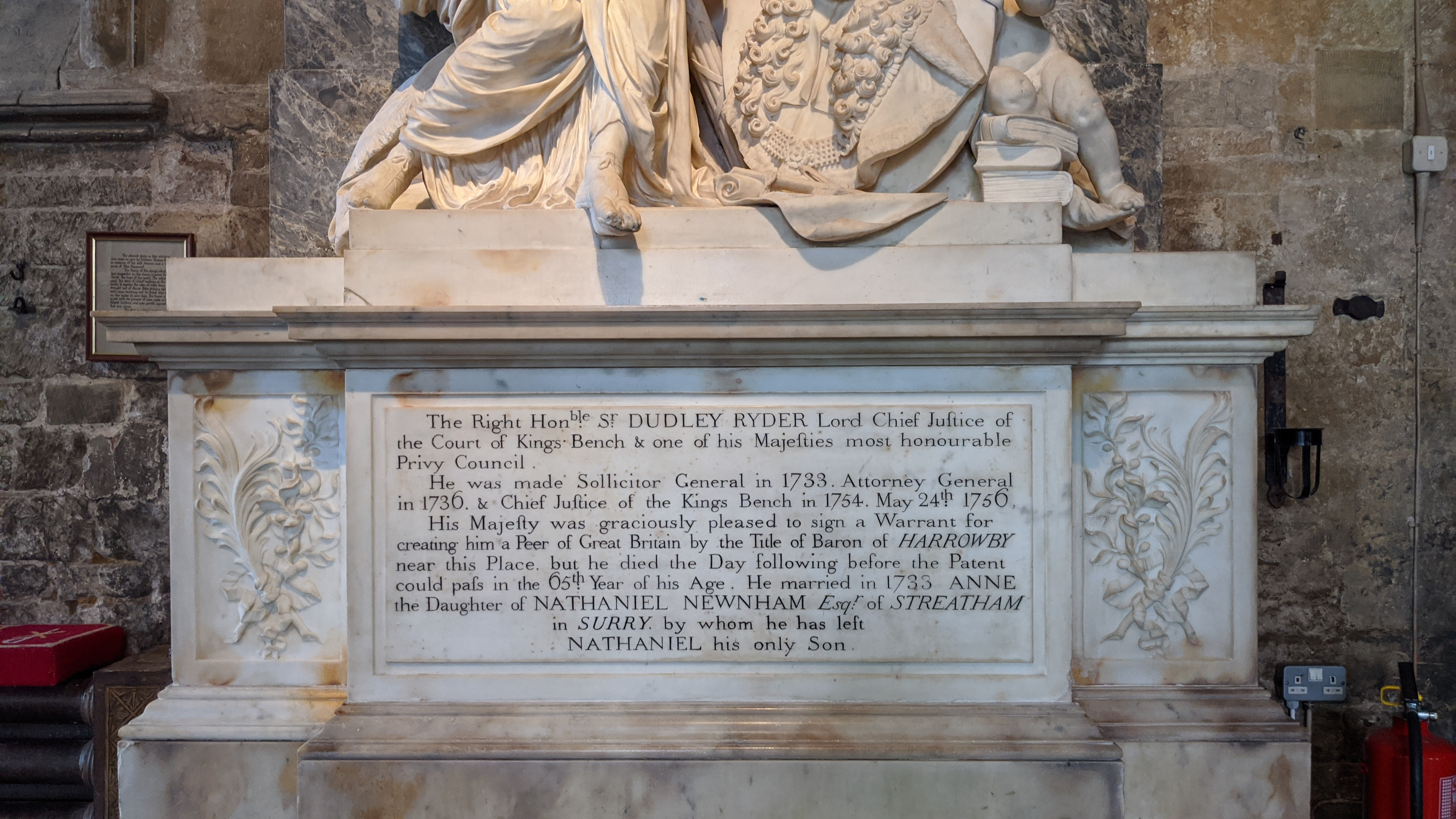
The tomb of Lord Dudley Ryder

Sir Dudley Ryder, PC (4 November 1691 – 25 May 1756) was a British lawyer, writer and politician who sat in the House of Commons of Great Britain from 1733 until 1754 when he was appointed Chief Justice of the King's Bench.

== Early life ==
Ryder was the second son of Richard Ryder, a draper of Hackney, Middlesex, and his second wife Elizabeth Marshall, daughter of William Marshall of Lincoln's Inn. He studied at a dissenting academy in Hackney and the University of Edinburgh, Scotland and Leiden University in The Netherlands. He went to the Middle Temple in 1713 (where he kept a diary from 1715 to 1716, in which he minutely recorded “whatever occurs to me in the day worth observing”). In 1719, he was called to the Bar. He married Anne Newnham, daughter of Nathaniel Newnham of Streatham, Surrey in November 1733.

== Career ==
Ryder was returned as Member of Parliament for St Germans at a by election on 1 March 1733. He was also made Solicitor General by Sir Robert Walpole in 1733. At the 1734 British general election, he switched to Tiverton where he was returned unopposed as MP. He was appointed as Attorney General in 1737. At the creation of the Foundling Hospital in London in 1739 he was one of the founding governors. In 1740, he was knighted. He topped the poll in a contest at the 1741 British general election and was returned unopposed again in 1747. On 2 May 1754 he was made a Privy Councillor and Chief Justice of the King's Bench, a post he held until his death. He did not stand for parliament at the 1754 general election. The King refused his application for a peerage until he had served in office for two years. A patent creating him a peer was signed by the King on 24 May 1756, but Ryder died the following day and was in no position to kiss hands to take it up.

Horace Walpole thought Ryder "a man of singular goodness and integrity; of the highest reputation in his profession, of the lowest in the House, where he wearied the audience by the multiplicity of his arguments; resembling the physician who ordered a medicine to be composed of all the simples in a meadow, as there must be some of them at least that would be proper".

His half-brother Thomas Ryder was MP for Tiverton until 1756. Ryder died leaving one son Nathaniel who became the first Baron Harrowby.

== Notes ==
Parliament of Great Britain
Preceded by Sir Gilbert Heathcote, Bt; Richard Eliot	Member of Parliament for St Germans; 1733–1734; With: Richard Eliot	Succeeded by The Lord Baltimore; Charles Montagu
Preceded by Arthur Arscott; James Nelthorpe	Member of Parliament for Tiverton; 1734–1754; With: Arthur Arscott 1734–1747; Sir William Yonge, Bt 1747; Henry Conyngham 1747–1754	Succeeded by Sir William Yonge, Bt; Henry Pelham
Legal offices
Preceded by Charles Talbot	Solicitor General; 1733–1737	Succeeded by John Strange
Preceded by Sir John Willes	Attorney General; 1737–1754	Succeeded by William Murray
Preceded by William Lee	Lord Chief Justice of the King's Bench; 1754–1756	Succeeded by William Murray
