= Thomas Ryder (MP) =

Member of Parliament for Tiverton
- In office 22 November 1755 – December 1756

Personal details
- Born: 1731
- Died: 2 November 1812 (aged 80–81)
- Relations: Dudley Ryder (half-brother); Nathaniel Ryder (nephew)

Thomas Ryder (1731 – 2 November 1812) was an English politician who was Member of Parliament (MP) for Tiverton from 1755 to 1756.

He was the half-brother of Lord Dudley Ryder, Lord Chief Justice of the King's Bench.
