= Gilbert Yarde =

English Member of Parliament (1673–1707)

Gilbert Yarde (1673-1707), of Bradley and Sharpham, Devon, was an English Member of Parliament (MP).

He served as a member of the Parliament of England for Ashburton from 1705 until his death in December 1707. He was the cousin of Ashburton MP Edward Yarde.
