= Robert Balle =

Robert Balle (c.1639-after 1731), of Mamhead, Devon; Campden House, Kensington, London; and Leghorn, Italy, was an English Member of Parliament (MP). He was a son of MP, Sir Peter Balle, MP for Tiverton.

He was a Member of the Parliament of England for Ashburton 1708–1710.
