= John Arscott (died 1778) =

British Member of Parliament (died 1788)

John Arscott (c.1718-88), of Tetcott, Devon, was an English Member of Parliament.

He was a son of Arthur Arscott, MP for Tiverton. He was a Member (MP) of the Parliament of Great Britain for Ashburton 1741–1754.
