= Sir William Yonge, 4th Baronet =

18th-century English politician

The Right Honourable Sir William Yonge Bt, KCB, FRS
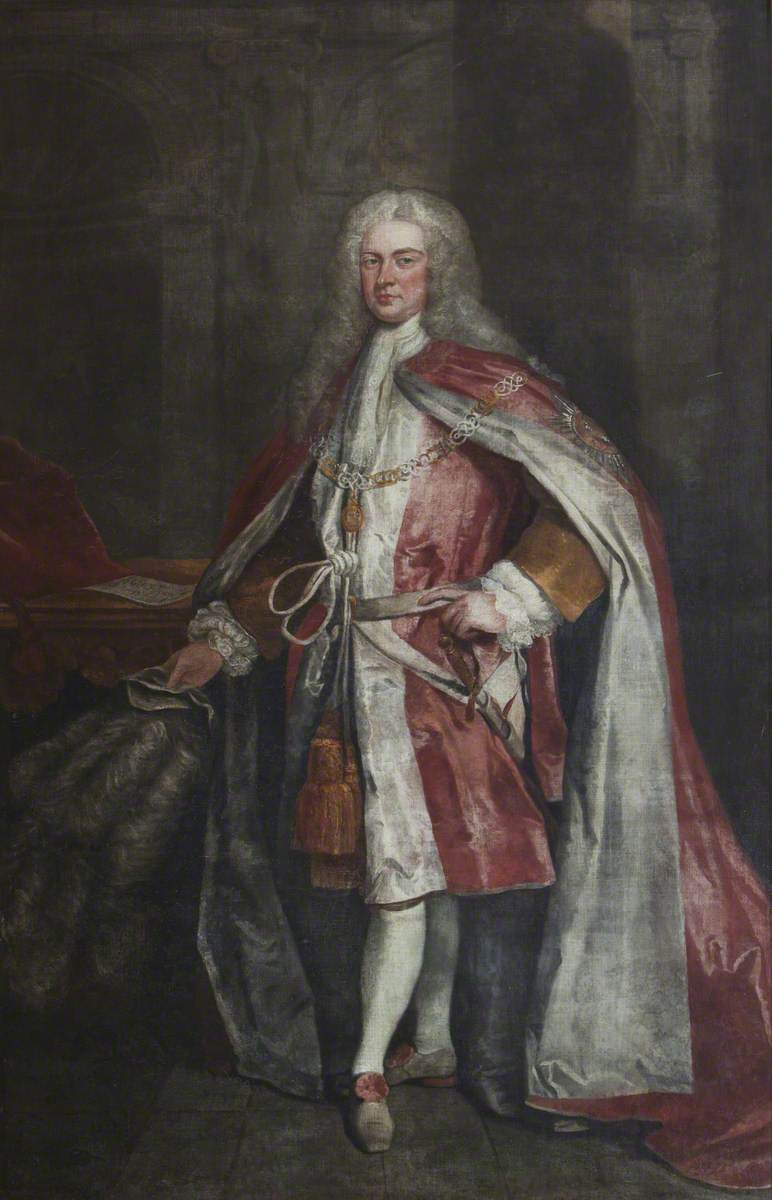

Member of the British Parliament for Honiton
- In office 1715–1754

Member of the British Parliament for Tiverton
- In office 1754–1755

Yonge baronetcy
- In office 1731–1755

Personal details
- Born: c. 1693
- Died: 10 August 1755 (aged 61–62)
- Children: 9, including George
- Parents: Sir Walter Yonge, 3rd Baronet; Gwen Williams

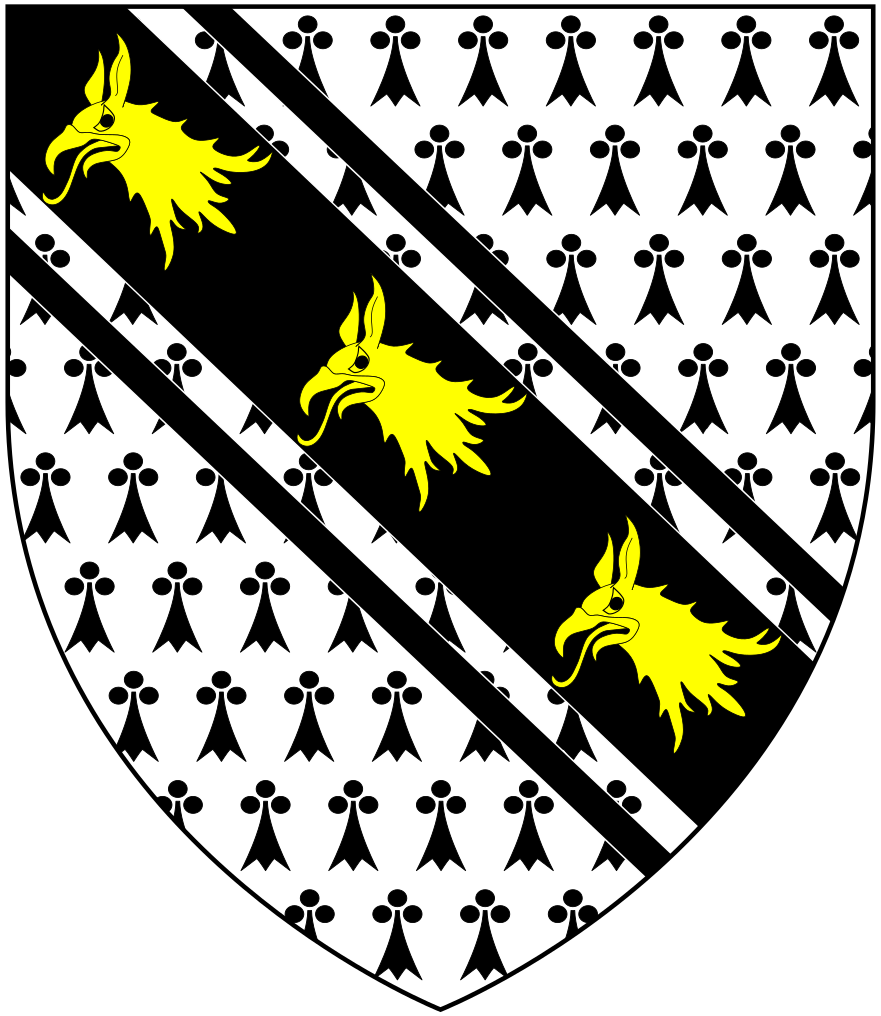
Arms of Yonge: Ermine, on a bend cotised sable three griffin's heads erased or

Sir William Yonge, 4th Baronet, KCB, FRS, PC (c. 1693 – 10 August 1755) of Escot House in the parish of Talaton in Devon, was an English politician who sat in the House of Commons for 39 years from 1715 to 1754.

== Origins ==
Yonge was the son and heir of Sir Walter Yonge, 3rd Baronet, and his second wife Gwen Williams, daughter of Sir Robert Williams, 2nd Baronet of Penryn, Cornwall. He was a great-great-grandson of Walter Yonge (1579–1649), a lawyer, merchant and notable diarist, whose diaries (1604–45) are valuable material for the contemporaneous history of Great Britain.

== Career ==
In 1715 Yonge was returned as Member of Parliament for his family's Rotten Borough of Honiton, in Devon and held the seat until 1754. He was also returned for Tiverton at the general elections of 1727, 1747 and 1754 but only took the seat in 1754. In the House of Commons he attached himself to the Whigs, and making himself useful to Sir Robert Walpole, was rewarded with a commissionership of the Treasury in 1724. King George II, who conceived a strong antipathy to Sir William, spoke of him as "Stinking Yonge"; but Yonge obtained a commissionership of the Admiralty in 1728, was restored to the Treasury in 1730, and in 1735 became Secretary at War. He distinguished himself especially in his defence of the Government against a hostile motion by Pulteney in 1742. He was created KB in 1725.

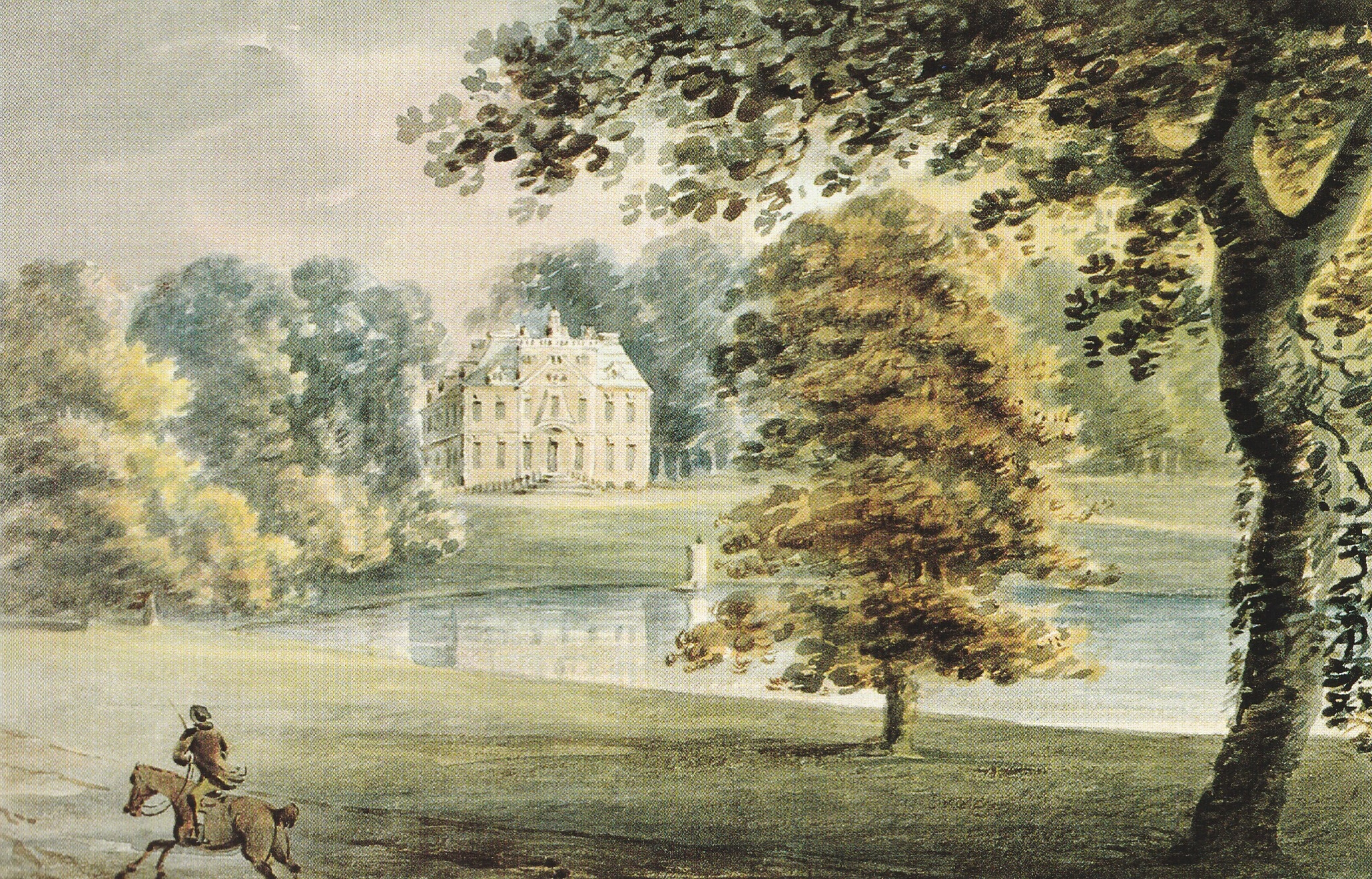
Escot House, Devon

Making friends with the Pelhams, he was appointed Vice-Treasurer of Ireland for life in 1746. Acting on the committee of management for the impeachment of Lord Lovat in 1747, he won the applause of Horace Walpole by moving that prisoners impeached for high treason should be allowed the assistance of counsel. In 1748 he was elected a Fellow of the Royal Society. He was a founding Governor of the Foundling Hospital, which worked to alleviate the scourge of child abandonment.

He succeeded his father, the 3rd Baronet, in 1731, taking possession of Escot House near Ottery St Mary, Devon, which had been built by his father.

== Literary career ==
Yonge enjoyed some reputation as a versifier, some of his lines being even mistaken for the work of Pope, greatly to the disgust of the latter. He wrote the lyrics incorporated in a comic opera, adapted from Richard Brome's The Jovial Crew, which was produced at the Drury Lane Theatre in 1730 and had considerable success.

== Marriages and children ==
Yonge married in 1716, Mary, the daughter of Samuel Heathcote of Hackney, from whom he was divorced in 1724. At this point they had lived for some time apart and Yonge had a number of extramarital affairs. But when he found out his wife had a lover, too, he took the opportunity to sue his wife's lover for damages, and then as the result of the divorce proceedings he got his wife's dowry and a greater part of her fortune. The case was the inspiration for Lady Mary Montagu to write a poem "Epistle from Mrs Yonge to Her Husband", protesting against the sexual double standard of her era.

By his second wife, Anne Howard, a daughter and coheiress of Thomas Howard, 6th Baron Howard of Effingham, he had two sons and six daughters.

== Death ==
Yonge died at his seat of Escot, near Honiton, on 10 August 1755. He was succeeded in his title and estates by his eldest son Sir George Yonge, 5th Baronet.

Parliament of Great Britain
Preceded by Sir William Drake; James Sheppard	Member of Parliament for Honiton; 1715–1754; With: Sir William Courtenay 1715–1716; Sir William Pole, Bt 1716–1727, 1731–1734; James Sheppard 1727–1731; William Courtenay 1734–1741; Henry Reginald Courtenay 1741–1747; John Duke 1747–1754	Succeeded by Henry Reginald Courtenay; George Yonge
Preceded by Arthur Arscott; George Deane	Member of Parliament for Tiverton; 1727–1728; With: Arthur Arscott	Succeeded by Arthur Arscott; James Nelthorpe
Preceded by Arthur Arscott; Sir Dudley Ryder	Member of Parliament for Tiverton; 1747; With: Sir Dudley Ryder	Succeeded by Sir Dudley Ryder; Henry Conyngham
Preceded by Sir Dudley Ryder; Henry Conyngham	Member of Parliament for Tiverton; 1754–1755; With: Henry Pelham	Succeeded by Henry Pelham; Thomas Ryder
Political offices
Preceded by Sir William Strickland	Secretary at War; 1735–1741	Succeeded by Thomas Winnington
Honorary titles
Preceded by The Duke of Ancaster and Kesteven	Custos Rotulorum of Caernarvonshire; 1739–1755	Succeeded by Sir John Wynn, Bt
Baronetage of England
Preceded by Walter Yonge	Baronet (of Culliton); 1731–1755	Succeeded by George Yonge
