= Honiton (disambiguation) =

Honiton is a civil parish in Devon, England.

Honiton may also refer to:

== Places ==
- Honiton, South Australia
- Clyst Honiton, a village in Devon, England
- Honiton (UK Parliament constituency), a defunct parliamentary constituency of the United Kingdom
- Honiton railway station

== Institutions ==
- Honiton Town F.C., a football club based in Honiton, England

== Arts ==
- Honiton lace, a style of bobbin lace from Honiton, England
- Honiton pottery, a type of pottery from Honiton, England
