= Hugh Duncan Baillie =

British Army officer and politician

Hugh Duncan Baillie (31 May 1777 – 21 June 1866) was a British Army officer and politician who served as the Lord Lieutenant of Ross-shire from 1843 to 1866.

== Early life ==
He was the second son of Evan Baillie of Dochfour, a prosperous Scottish merchant based in Bristol, and his wife Mary, daughter of Peter Gurley of St Vincent. His brothers were Peter Baillie and James Evan Baillie. Hugh succeeded his father in 1835.

== Personal life ==
He had married twice: firstly 13 Dec 1796, at the Cape of Good Hope, Elizabeth, the daughter of Rev. Henry Reynett of Goodmans Fields, London (whose grandfather was a Huguenot who had moved from France to Ireland), with whom he had a son and 3 daughters and secondly 02 Jul 1821 Mary, the daughter of Thomas Smith of Castleton Hall, Lancashire, with whom he had 3 sons and a daughter. He bought the Ross-shire estate of Redcastle from the Trustees of Sir William Fettes after the latter's death in 1836.

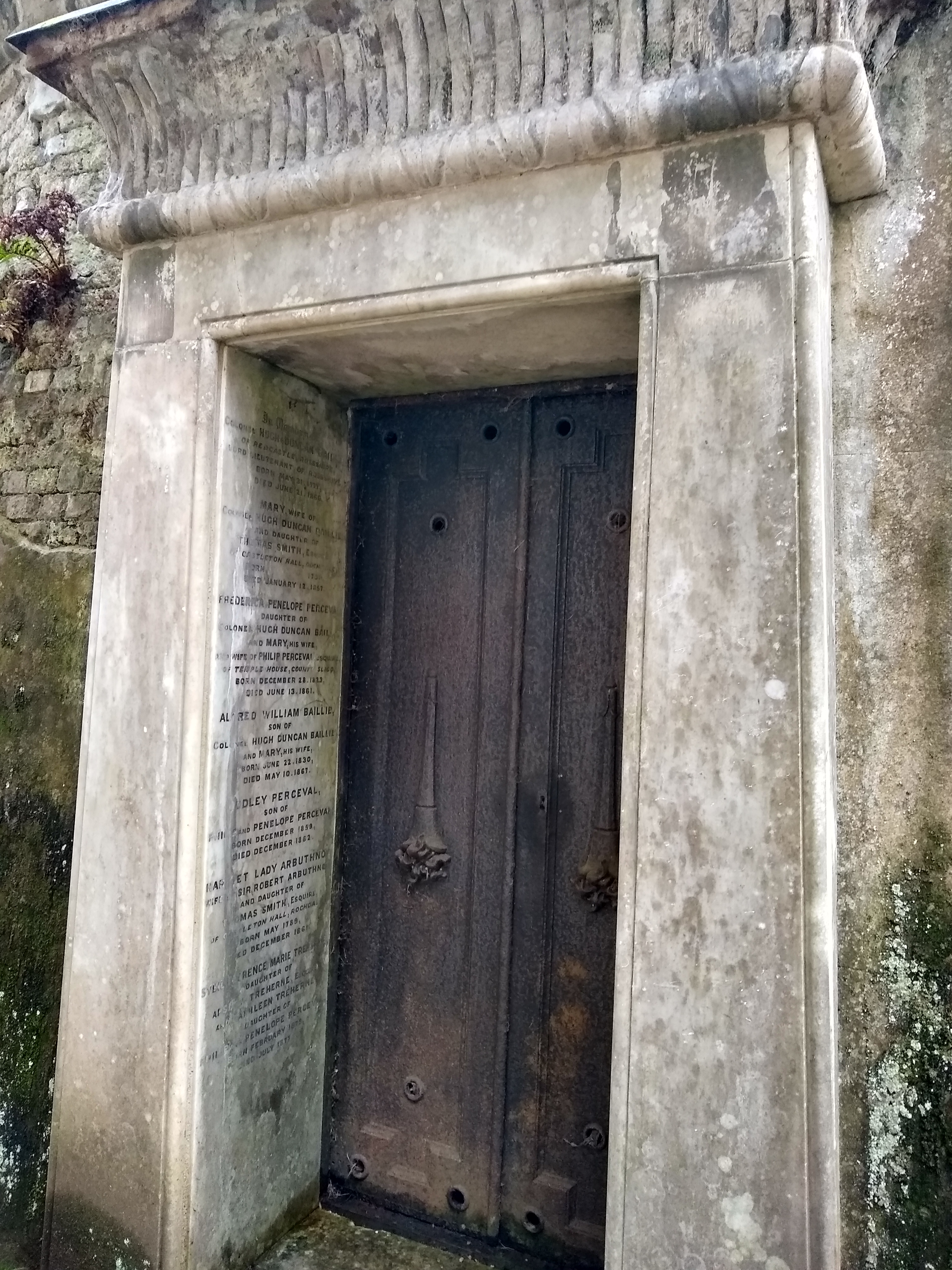
Family vault of Hugh Duncan Baillie in the Lebanon Circle at Highgate Cemetery (West)

== Career ==
He joined the Army as an ensign in the 37th Foot in 1793. He was promoted to lieutenant in the 93rd Foot the same year, to captain in the 97th Foot and then major in the 86th Foot in 1794 and to lieutenant-colonel in 1800. He took part in the British occupation of the Dutch Cape Colony between 1796 and 1802 during the Napoleonic Wars. He went on to half pay with the Surrey Rangers from 1802 to 1825 and was finally made a colonel of the army in 1810. He retired from the army in 1825.

In 1812 he and his brother James became partners in the Bristol Old Bank. Hugh had become senior partner by his death. He entered Parliament as the MP for Rye in 1830 and was then returned for Honiton in 1835, sitting until 1847. He served as Lord lieutenant of Ross-shire from 1843 until his death. During the Parliament of 1835 he received a share of a compensation award totalling over £60,000 for the freed slaves on some 17 estates in British Guiana, Grenada, St Kitts, St Vincent and Trinidad which he either owned or in which he had an interest in.

== Death ==
He died in 1866. His personal estate after his death was valued at under £50,000. He is buried in a family vault on the inner ring of the Lebanon Circle at Highgate Cemetery (West). His son Duncan Baillie was also a British Army officer and rose to the rank of lieutenant-general.

Parliament of the United Kingdom
Preceded by George de Lacy Evans; Richard Arkwright	Member of Parliament for Rye; 1830 – 1831; With: Francis Robert Bonham	Succeeded by Thomas Pemberton Leigh; George de Lacy Evans
Preceded by James Ruddell-Todd; Viscount Villiers	Member of Parliament for Honiton; 1835 – 1847; With: Arthur Chichester 1835–37; James Stewart 1837–41; Forster Alleyne McGeachy 1841–47	Succeeded by Joseph Locke; Sir James Weir Hogg, Bt
