= Forster Alleyne McGeachy =

Forster Alleyne McGeachy (1809 – 20 March 1887) was a politician, Conservative Member of Parliament in the UK, and a school reformer.

== Early life ==
McGeachy was born in Bristol in 1809, the son of Alexander McGeachy and his wife Sarah Gibbes Alleyne. His maternal grandfather, John Foster Alleyne, was at one point acting Governor of Barbados. He received his education at Balliol College, Oxford, from where he graduated with a BA in 1832.

== Career ==
McGeachy was elected MP for Honiton from 1841 to 1847. He was a member of the Canterbury Association from 17 March 1849. In 1850, he joined the association's management committee. He was High Sheriff of Hertfordshire in 1865.

== Family ==
He married Anna Maria Letitia Adderley on 3 April 1834 at Westbury-on-Trym, a sister of the 1st Baron Norton. His wife died in 1841. He married again in 1848, to Clara Newcome, a daughter of Reverend Thomas Newcome. McGeachy died at Barnet in Hertfordshire on 20 March 1887.

Parliament of the United Kingdom
Preceded by James Stewart; Hugh Duncan Baillie	Member of Parliament for Honiton; 1841 – 1847; With: Hugh Duncan Baillie	Succeeded by Joseph Locke; James Hogg
