= Sir George Warrender, 4th Baronet =

Scottish politician

Sir George Warrender of Lochend, 4th Baronet, PC, FRS, FRSE (5 December 1782 – 21 February 1849) was a Scottish politician. In 1799, he succeeded to his father's baronetcy. Due to his lifestyle, he was nicknamed Sir Gorge Provender.

== Life ==
Born in Dunbar, he was the son of Lieutenant-Colonel Sir Patrick Warrender, 3rd Baronet and H. Blair. Warrender was educated at Christ Church, Oxford, where he matriculated in 1799 and at Trinity College, Cambridge, where he graduated with an MA in 1811. He was commissioned as Lieutenant-Colonel of the Berwickshire, Haddington, Linlithgow and Peebles Militia on 11 March 1805.

Warrender was Member of Parliament (MP) for Haddington Burghs from 1807 to 1812 and for Truro from 1812 to 1818. He was further Member of Parliament for Sandwich from 1818 to 1826, for Westbury from 1826 to 1830, as well as for Honiton from 1830 to 1832.

Between 1812 and 1822, Warrender was Lord of the Admiralty and between 1822 and 1828, Commissioner of the Board of Control. On 4 February 1822, he was sworn of the Privy Council.

On 3 October 1810, he married Hon. Anne Evelyn Boscawen, daughter of the 3rd Viscount Falmouth in St James's in Westminster. Their marriage was childless and unhappy.

He was elected a Fellow of the Royal Society in 1815 and a Fellow of the Royal Society of Edinburgh in 1823, his proposer being Sir Henry Jardine.

In the 1830s he was living at 625 Castlehill at the top of the Royal Mile in Edinburgh.

He died in Upper Berkeley Street in London on 21 February 1849 aged 66, and was succeeded by his younger brother John Warrender.

Parliament of the United Kingdom
Preceded by William Lamb	Member of Parliament for Haddington Burghs; 1807–1812	Succeeded by Thomas Maitland
Preceded by John Lemon; William John Bankes	Member of Parliament for Truro; 1812–1818; With: John Lemon 1812–1814; George Dashwood 1814–1818	Succeeded by William Edward Tomline; Lord Fitzroy Somerset
Preceded by Joseph Marryat; Sir Joseph Sydney Yorke	Member of Parliament for Sandwich; 1818–1826; With: Joseph Marryat 1818–1824; Henry Bonham 1824–1826	Succeeded by Joseph Marryat; Sir Edward Campbell Rich Owen
Preceded by Sir Manasseh Masseh Lopes; Philip John Miles	Member of Parliament for Westbury; 1826–1830; With: Sir Manasseh Masseh Lopes 1826–1829; Robert Peel 1829–1830	Succeeded by Sir Alexander Cray Grant; Michael George Prendergast
Preceded by Josiah John Guest; Henry Baines Lott	Member of Parliament for Honiton; 1830–1832; With: Josiah John Guest 1830–1831; Henry Baines Lott 1831–1832	Succeeded by James Ruddell-Todd; Viscount Villiers
Baronetage of Great Britain
Preceded by Patrick Warrender	Baronet (of Lochend); 1799–1849	Succeeded by John Warrender
