= Tapete =

Audio cassette format for audiobooks for the blind

Tapete, also known as Mark IV cassette, is an audio cassette format designed for audiobooks developed for the Royal National Institute for the Blind (RNIB). It was developed by the firm of Clarke & Smith Industries of Wallington, Hampshire, and could store over twelve hours of speech yet was compact enough to be sent in the post. It also featured a spoken index track, allowing for rewind and fast forward by section for blind users.

The Tapete was developed for the Mark IV playback system, which was a refined version of the earlier "Mark I" system introduced by the RNIB in 1959. Prior to introduction of the Mark IV system, 6-pound (2.7 kg) cassettes were mailed to 22,000 subscribers.

The format was in "large-scale use" by the RNIB by mid-1969. It was mainly used in Great Britain and a few other Commonwealth countries, with other markets such as the United States and most other European countries opting to maintain disc-based systems for audiobooks. The only other Western European countries to adopt the system were Switzerland, Spain and Finland.

Clarke & Smith as a company became increasingly reliant on the RNIB contract by the mid-1970s. As early as the 1980s, the RNIB investigated newer, digital formats, and in the later part of the decade it commissioned another company to reverse engineer the format. The RNIB began preparing its transition to the Digital Accessible Information System (DAISY) in the late 1990s, pulling its contract at the same time that Frank Clarke, the company's founder, unexpectedly died.
