= East Devon by-election =

East Devon by-election may refer to:

- 1870 East Devon by-election
- 1885 East Devon by-election
