= Henry Lott =

Henry Lott may refer to:

- Henry Baines Lott (1781–1833), English politician, Member of Parliament
- Henry Lott (murderer), American whiskey trader who murdered Inkpaduta's brother in 1852 in revenge for the death of his son
