= Alexander MacLeod =

Alexander MacLeod, Alexander Macleod or Alexander McLeod may refer to:

- Alexander Macleod (MP) (c. 1715–1790), British politician
- Alexander Roderick McLeod (c. 1782–1840), Canadian fur trader and explorer
- Alexander McLeod (1796–1871), Canadian citizen accused and tried in New York of instigating the Caroline affair
- Alexander McLeod (1832–1902), founding member of the Royal Arsenal Co-operative Society
- Alex McLeod (politician) (1872–1938), New Zealand politician
- Alexander Samuel MacLeod (1888–1956), Canadian-born painter
- A. A. MacLeod (Alexander Albert MacLeod, 1902–1970), Canadian pacifist and YMCA secretary
- Alexander MacLeod (writer) (born 1972), Canadian short story writer and university professor
