= Wallington, England =

Wallington, England may refer to:

- Wallington, Hampshire, a village in Hampshire, U.K.
- Wallington, Hertfordshire, a village in Hertfordshire, U.K.
- Wallington, London, a town in the London Borough of Sutton, U.K.
- Wallington, Surrey, an older name for Wallington, London, U.K.
