= Quay Street Viaduct =

- The main arch over Quay Street and the western flanking arches
- Coordinates: 50°51′01″N 1°10′38″W
- Carries: West Coastway line
- Crosses: Quay Street
- Locale: Fareham, Hampshire, England
- Heritage status: Grade II listed building

Characteristics
- Material: Brick
- Longest span: 36 ft (11 m)
- No. of spans: 11

History
- Opened: 1848

Location
- Interactive map of Quay Street Viaduct

Quay Street Viaduct is a railway bridge in Fareham, Hampshire, on the south coast of England. Built in 1848 by Joseph Locke, it is a Grade II listed building.

== Description ==
Hampshire has few railway viaducts, largely owing to the lack of major rivers and significant terrain. Quay Street Viaduct is the shorter and more westerly of two adjacent viaducts in Fareham, the other being Cams Hill Viaduct, which crosses the River Wallington. Quay Street Viaduct crosses a series of roads, including Quay Street (part of the A32 road), just east of the town's railway station on the edge of the town centre. The viaduct is on a curve. It is built in red brick and has 11 spans, of which all but one are segmental arches with a 30-foot (9.1-metre) span. The main span, the fourth from the east (over Quay Street), is a skew arch flanked by king piers. and has a 36-foot (11-metre) span and dog-tooth voussoirs. Above the arches is a yellow-brick string course and a coped (rounded) parapet. The viaduct is a local landmark, dominating the view of the town from the south and cutting off views of the quay.

== History ==
Joseph Locke designed the viaduct for the London and South Western Railway, whose line already reached Fareham from London. The viaduct was built for an extension to Portsmouth and now forms part of the West Coastway line from Southampton in the west to Brighton in the east. It opened in 1848. It is a Grade II listed building, first listed in 1976. A more-recent bridge, carrying the A27 road runs parallel to the viaduct.
