= Cams Hill Viaduct =

- The Portchester Road skew arch (centre) and River Wallingford spans (right), with a Class 387 passing overhead
- Coordinates: 50°51′10″N 1°10′02″W
- Carries: West Coastway line
- Crosses: River Wallington
- Locale: Fareham, Hampshire, England
- Heritage status: Grade II listed building

Characteristics
- Material: Brick
- Longest span: 36 ft (11 m)
- No. of spans: 16

History
- Opened: 1848

Location
- Interactive map of Cams Hill Viaduct

Cams Hill Viaduct (also known as Portchester Road Viaduct, the Wallington Viaduct, or Fareham Viaduct) is a railway bridge over the River Wallington in Fareham, Hampshire, on the south coast of England. Built in 1848 by Joseph Locke, it is a Grade II listed building.

== Description ==
Hampshire has few railway viaducts, largely owing to the lack of major rivers and significant terrain. Cams Hill Viaduct is the longer and more easterly of two adjacent viaducts in Fareham, the other being Quay Street Viaduct, on the southern edge of the town centre. Cams Hill Viaduct has 17 arches, which carry the railway over the River Wallington, Portchester Road and the edge of a tidal creek. Most of the arches have a span of 30 feet (9.1 metres) except the span over Portchester Road, which is a skew arch of 36-foot (11-metre) span, and two blind arches adjacent to it. The road is part of the A32; the viaduct crosses at its junction with Cams Hill, which is part of the A27 dual carriageway.

From the north-east, the viaduct starts with seven semi-circular arches of increasing height, three of which cross the River Wallington. The next arch is the wider skew span, which is followed by the two smaller blind arches, flanked by king pier or pilasters, then eight more semi-circular arches, which cross the tidal creek formed by the river estuary. Above the arches, the viaduct has a yellow-brick string course and a coped (rounded) parapets. The main arch has a dog-tooth pattern voussoirs. The viaduct is a prominent local landmark, cutting off the view of the creek from the town centre.

== History ==
Joseph Locke designed the viaduct for the London and South Western Railway, whose line already reached Fareham from London. The viaduct was built for an extension to Portsmouth and now forms part of the West Coastway line from Southampton in the west to Brighton in the east. It opened in 1848. It is a Grade II listed building, first listed in 1976. The A27 dual carriageway runs parallel.
