= Tancock =

Tancock is a surname. Notable people with the surname include:

- Rachel Tancock (de Montmorency) (1891–1961), English painter and artist working in stained glass
- Betty Tancock (1911–2009), Canadian swimmer who competed in the Olympic games in 1932 in Los Angeles
- Kirstie Tancock (d, 2016), British organ donation campaigner
- Leonard Tancock (1902–1986), English translator of French literature, taught at University College London
- Liam Tancock (born 1985), English former competitive swimmer who represented Great Britain in the Olympics
- O. W. Tancock (1839–1930), English clergyman, headmaster and author
- Scott Tancock (born 1993), Welsh footballer
