= Juanita Maxwell Phillips =

20th century British politician and activist

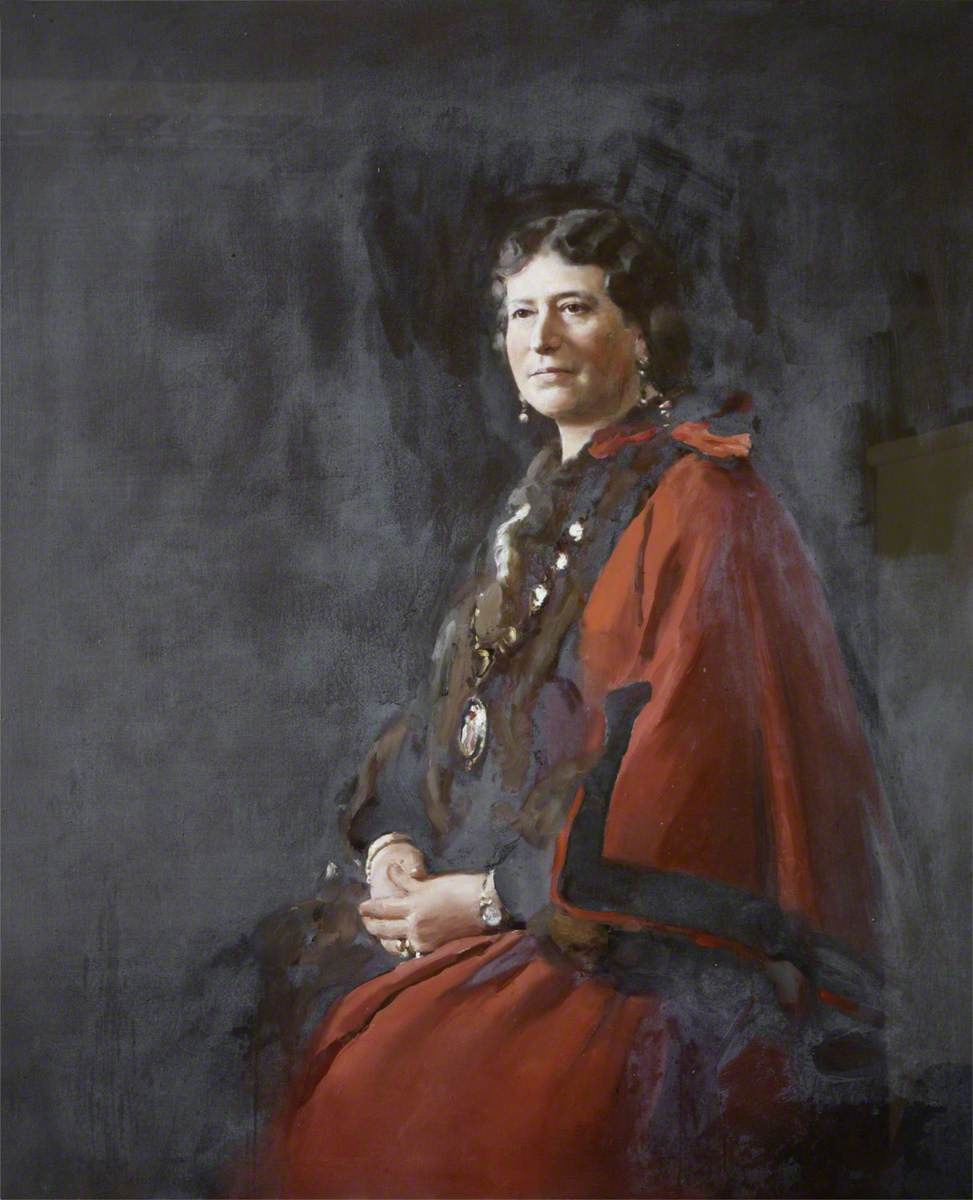
- A portrait of Juanita Maxwell Phillips by John Lavery

Member of Honiton Borough Council
- In office 1920–1953

Mayor of Honiton
- In office 1920–24; 1925–26; 1936–39; 1945–46

Member of Devon County Council
- In office 1931–1965

Personal details
- Born: Juanita Maxwell Comber; 23 June 1880 Valparaíso, Chile
- Died: 14 November 1966 (aged 86)
- Resting place: Awliscombe
- Party: Independent
- Occupation: Politician and activist

Juanita Maxwell Phillips OBE (23 June 1880 – 14 November 1966) was a Chilean-born British politician and activist. She was the first woman to serve on Honiton Borough Council (now Honiton Town Council), as mayor of Honiton, and on Devon County Council. As mayor of Honiton, she became the first woman mayor in the West Country. She was named an Officer of the Order of the British Empire in 1950.

== Early life ==
Phillips was born in Valparaíso, Chile to Margarita Maxwell Comber and Thomas Comber, a British businessman in the mineral industry. The family had moved back to the United Kingdom by the early 1890s. She married Tom Phillips, a solicitor, in 1906. During the First World War, she served in the War Office.

== Activism ==
Phillips was involved in the suffrage movement and other social movements for women's rights. As a suffragist, she headed local chapters of the Women's Social and Political Union, sold a suffragist newspaper, participated in protests, and picketed outside the Exeter jail where Emmeline Pankhurst was held after an arrest in December 1913.

Phillips was a member of numerous activist groups. Among other organizations, she belonged to the National Union of Societies for Equal Citizenship (earlier called the National Union of Women's Suffrage Societies); the Open Door Council, for which she was a member of the Executive Committee; the National Council of Women, of which she helped to found the Devon chapter; the Women's Institutes; and the Six Point Group. Like many members of the Six Point Group, she opposed new feminism.

== Political career ==
Phillips became a justice of the peace in 1922 and also served as a Poor Law guardian.

In 1921, she was first elected to Honiton Borough Council as an independent. She served, as both a councillor and alderman, until 1953, when she and her husband moved out of Honiton. In the 1920s, while a member of Honiton Borough Council, she championed the appointment of women police officers.

Phillips stood for Devon County Council in 1928, but lost by 74 votes. She was first elected to Council, running opposed, in 1931, and served until 1965. On Council, she served on the committees for Maternity and Child Welfare (of which she was chair as of 1941), Public Assistance, Public Health, Air Raids Precautions (during the Second World War), and Education.

== Bibliography ==
- Law, Cheryl (2000). Women, A Modern Political Dictionary. London: I.B. Tauris. ISBN 9781860645020 – via Internet Archive.
- Neville, Julia (December 2013). "Challenge, Conformity and Casework in Interwar England: The First Women Councillors in Devon". Women's History Review. 22 (6): 971–994. doi:10.1080/09612025.2013.780846. ISSN 0961-2025. S2CID 144264125.
