= East Devon (constituency) =

UK Parliament constituency (1997–2024)

- Former county constituency for the House of Commons
- Boundary of East Devon in Devon for the 2010 general election

- Location of Devon within England
- County: Devon
- Electorate: 72,406 (December 2010)
- Major settlements: Exmouth and Sidmouth

1997–2024
- Seats: One
- Created from: Honiton
- Replaced by: Honiton and Sidmouth Exmouth and Exeter East

1868–1885
- Seats: Two
- Type of constituency: County constituency
- Created from: South Devon
- Replaced by: Ashburton; Honiton; Torquay

East Devon was a UK parliamentary constituency (Note: A county constituency (for the purposes of election expenses and type of returning officer)), represented most recently in the House of Commons of the UK Parliament by Simon Jupp of the Conservative Party. (Note: As with all constituencies, the constituency elected one Member of Parliament (MP) by the first past the post system of election at least every five years.)

A report by the Electoral Reform Society found the seat (and its precursors) had been held by the Conservative Party since 1835, meaning it had been held for 186 years, the longest held seat by one party anywhere in the country.

The 2023 review of Westminster constituencies abolished the constituency with the majority of the electorate, including Exmouth and Budleigh Salterton, being absorbed into Exmouth and Exeter East, which was first contested at the 2024 general election. Sidmouth and Ottery St Mary were transferred to the new seat of Honiton and Sidmouth.

== Boundaries ==
Map of boundaries 2010–2024

1868–1885: The Hundreds of Axminster, Cliston, Colyton, East Budleigh, Exminster, Ottery St. Mary, Haytor, and Teignbridge, and Exeter Castle, and the parts of the hundred of Wonford that are not included in the city of Exeter.

1997–2010: The District of East Devon wards of Axminster Hamlets, Axminster Town, Beer, Budleigh Salterton, Colyton, Edenvale, Exmouth Brixington, Exmouth Halsdon, Exmouth Littleham Rural, Exmouth Littleham Urban, Exmouth Withycombe Raleigh, Exmouth Withycombe Urban, Lympstone, Newbridges, Newton Poppleford and Harpford, Raleigh, Seaton, Sidmouth Rural, Sidmouth Town, Sidmouth Woolbrook, Trinity, Upper Axe, Woodbury, and Yarty.

2010–2024: The District of East Devon wards of Broadclyst, Budleigh, Clyst Valley, Exmouth Brixington, Exmouth Halsdon, Exmouth Littleham, Exmouth Town, Exmouth Withycombe Raleigh, Newton Poppleford and Harpford, Ottery St Mary Rural, Ottery St Mary Town, Raleigh, Sidmouth Rural, Sidmouth Sidford, Sidmouth Town, Whimple, and Woodbury and Lympstone, and the City of Exeter wards of St Loyes and Topsham.

The constituency was in the county of Devon, including eastern wards of Exeter City, and had a shoreline on the Jurassic Coast. It was bounded on the west by the constituencies of Central Devon and Exeter and on the east by Tiverton and Honiton.

Following a review of parliamentary representation in Devon by the Boundary Commission for England, which increased the number of seats in the county from 11 to 12, East Devon was subject to significant boundary changes at the 2010 general election. In particular, the towns of Axminster and Seaton were transferred to the Tiverton and Honiton constituency. In addition, two wards from the City of Exeter became part of the East Devon seat.

== Constituency profile ==
The main settlements in the constituency were the City Of Exeter Ward, St Loyes and neighbouring Topsham, the resorts of Exmouth, Budleigh Salterton and Sidmouth, and the inland towns of Ottery St Mary and Cranbrook.

== Members of Parliament ==
=== MPs 1868–1885 ===
- Constituency created – two seats (1868)

Election	First member	First party	Second member	Second party
1868	Sir Lawrence Palk, Bt	Conservative	Edward Courtenay	Conservative
1870 by-election	Sir Lawrence Palk, Bt	Conservative	Sir John Kennaway, Bt	Conservative
1880	William Walrond	Conservative	Sir John Kennaway, Bt	Conservative
1885	Constituency abolished			

The two-seat constituency of East Devon was abolished at the 1885 general election.

=== MPs 1997–2024 ===
At the 1997 general election a new constituency of East Devon was established. Sir Peter Emery, MP for Honiton since a 1967 by-election, represented the new East Devon seat until standing down in 2001, when Hugo Swire was elected.

In 2015, 2017 and 2019, the seat saw an unusually strong Independent performance, by the anti-austerity candidate Claire Wright, a Devon county councillor. She won 24% of the vote in 2015, 35.2% in 2017 and 40.4% in 2019, coming second (and significantly ahead of any other candidate) each time.

Election	Member	Party
1997	Sir Peter Emery	Conservative
2001	Sir Hugo Swire	Conservative
2019	Simon Jupp	Conservative

== Elections ==
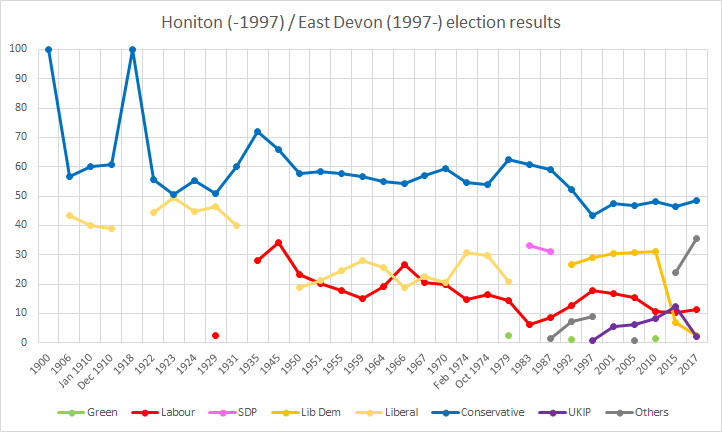
East Devon election results

=== Elections in the 2010s ===
In 2019, East Devon was one of five English constituencies (the others being Cheltenham, Esher and Walton, Westmorland and Lonsdale and Winchester) where Labour failed to obtain over 5% of the vote, and thus lost its deposit.

General election 2019: East Devon
Party	Candidate	Votes	%	±%
Conservative	Simon Jupp	32,577	50.8	+2.3
Independent	Claire Wright	25,869	40.4	+5.2
Labour	Dan Wilson	2,870	4.5	−6.9
Liberal Democrats	Eleanor Rylance	1,771	2.8	+0.4
Green	Henry Gent	711	1.1	New
Independent	Peter Faithfull	275	0.4	+0.2
Majority		6,708	10.4	−2.9
Turnout		64,073	73.8	+0.5
Conservative hold		Swing		

General election 2017: East Devon
Party	Candidate	Votes	%	±%
Conservative	Hugo Swire	29,306	48.5	+2.1
Independent	Claire Wright	21,270	35.2	+11.2
Labour	Jan Ross	6,857	11.4	+1.2
Liberal Democrats	Alison Eden	1,468	2.4	−4.4
UKIP	Brigitte Graham	1,203	2.0	−10.5
Independent	Peter Faithfull	150	0.2	N/A
Independent	Michael Davies	128	0.2	N/A
Majority		8,036	13.3	−9.1
Turnout		60,382	73.3	−0.4
Conservative hold		Swing		

General election 2015: East Devon
Party	Candidate	Votes	%	±%
Conservative	Hugo Swire	25,401	46.4	−1.9
Independent	Claire Wright	13,140	24.0	New
UKIP	Andrew Chapman	6,870	12.5	+4.3
Labour	Steve Race	5,591	10.2	−0.6
Liberal Democrats	Stuart Mole	3,715	6.8	−24.4
Majority		12,261	22.4	+5.3
Turnout		54,717	73.7	+1.1
Conservative hold		Swing	+5.4	

General election 2010: East Devon
Party	Candidate	Votes	%	±%
Conservative	Hugo Swire	25,662	48.3	+1.1
Liberal Democrats	Paull Robathan	16,548	31.2	+3.1
Labour	Gareth Manson	5,721	10.8	−7.5
UKIP	Mike Amor	4,346	8.2	+2.6
Green	Sharon Pavey	815	1.5	New
Majority		9,114	17.1	+1.0
Turnout		53,092	72.6	+4.6
Conservative hold		Swing	−1.0	

=== Elections in the 2000s ===
General election 2005: East Devon
Party	Candidate	Votes	%	±%
Conservative	Hugo Swire	23,075	46.9	−0.5
Liberal Democrats	Tim Dumper	15,139	30.7	+0.4
Labour	James Court	7,598	15.4	−1.3
UKIP	Colin McNamee	3,035	6.2	+0.6
Independent	Christopher Way	400	0.8	New
Majority		7,936	16.2	−0.9
Turnout		49,247	69.4	+0.6
Conservative hold		Swing	−0.5	

General election 2001: East Devon
Party	Candidate	Votes	%	±%
Conservative	Hugo Swire	22,681	47.4	+4.0
Liberal Democrats	Tim Dumper	14,486	30.3	+1.2
Labour	Phil Starr	7,974	16.7	−1.0
UKIP	David Wilson	2,696	5.6	+4.7
Majority		8,195	17.1	+2.8
Turnout		47,837	68.8	−7.2
Conservative hold		Swing	+1.4	

=== Elections in the 1990s ===
General election 1997: East Devon
Party	Candidate	Votes	%	±%
Conservative	Peter Emery	22,797	43.4	
Liberal Democrats	Rachel Trethewey	15,308	29.1	
Labour	Andrew Siantonas	9,292	17.7	
Referendum	William Dixon	3,200	6.1	
Liberal	Geoffrey Halliwell	1,363	2.6	
UKIP	Colin Giffard	459	0.9	
National Democrats	Gary Needs	131	0.2	
Majority		7,494	14.3	
Turnout		52,550	76.0	
Conservative win (new seat)				

=== Elections in the 1880s ===
By-election, 4 Jul 1885: East Devon (1 seat)
Party	Candidate	Votes	%	±%
Conservative	William Walrond	Unopposed		
Conservative hold				

- Caused by Walrond's appointment as a Lord Commissioner of the Treasury.

General election 1880: East Devon (2 seats)
Party	Candidate	Votes	%	±%
Conservative	John Kennaway	4,501	36.2	N/A
Conservative	William Walrond	4,457	35.8	N/A
Liberal	John Barton Sterling	3,487	28.0	New
Majority		970	7.8	N/A
Turnout		7,988 (est)	76.7 (est)	N/A
Registered electors		10,416		
Conservative hold		Swing	N/A	
Conservative hold		Swing	N/A	

=== Elections in the 1870s ===
General election 1874: East Devon (2 seats)
Party	Candidate	Votes	%	±%
Conservative	John Kennaway	Unopposed		
Conservative	William Walrond	Unopposed		
Registered electors		10,246		
Conservative hold				
Conservative hold				

By-election, 9 Apr 1870: East Devon (1 seat)
Party	Candidate	Votes	%	±%
Conservative	William Walrond	Unopposed		
Conservative hold				

- Caused by Courtenay's resignation.

=== Elections in the 1860s ===
General election 1868: East Devon (2 seats)
Party	Candidate	Votes	%	±%
Conservative	Lawrence Palk	4,034	35.1	
Conservative	Edward Courtenay	4,016	34.9	
Liberal	Charles Joseph Wade	3,457	30.0	
Majority		559	4.9	
Turnout		7,482 (est)	75.3 (est)	
Registered electors		9,933		
Conservative win (new seat)				
Conservative win (new seat)				

== See also ==
- parliamentary constituencies in Devon

== Sources ==
- Boundaries of Parliamentary Constituencies 1885–1972, compiled and edited by F.W.S. Craig (Parliamentary Reference Publications 1972)
- British Parliamentary Election Results 1832–1885, compiled and edited by F.W.S. Craig (Macmillan Press 1977)
- Who's Who of British Members of Parliament: Volume I 1832–1885, edited by M. Stenton (The Harvester Press 1976)
- Who's Who of British Members of Parliament, Volume II 1886–1918, edited by M. Stenton and S. Lees (Harvester Press 1978)
