= Richard Courtenay (MP) =

English politician

Member of Parliament for Honiton
- In office 1689

Personal details
- Born: c. 1655 England
- Died: 1696 (aged 40–41)

Richard Courtenay (c. 1655–1696), of Colyton, Devon and Fetcham, Surrey, was an English politician.

He was a member (MP) of the parliament of England for Honiton in 1689.
