= John Milroy =

British civil engineer (c. 1806–1886)

John Milroy FRSE AICE (c. 1806–1886) was a 19th-century British civil engineer involved with early railway construction in Britain and France.

== Life ==
In the pioneer days of the railway, he worked with Thomas Brassey on the construction of the Glasgow to Greenock railway (1838). He then joined Joseph Locke working on the Paris to Rouen railway (1841). He was subsequently involved in the Rouen to Le Havre line, Nantes to Caen, and Caen to Cherbourg. Continuing on construction in Britain, France, and Italy in 1865, he took over the construction of the Glasgow City Union Railway, working on this project until 1871. This included building a railway bridge over the River Clyde and working with the Clyde Trustees regarding new quays linking to the railway: Plantation Quay and Mavisbank Quay.

In 1875, at the relatively advanced age of 69 and well beyond his working career, he was elected a Fellow of the Royal Society of Edinburgh. His proposers were Sir James Falshaw, James Leslie, Edward Sang and John Duns.

In 1875, he was living at 88 Great Clyde Street.

He retired to Torsonce House at Stow in 1879 and died there on 9 October 1886.

== Publications ==
- Cylindrical and Columnar Foundations in Concrete (1873)
