= Sir John Kennaway, 3rd Baronet =

British politician

The Right Honourable Sir John Kennaway Bt CB DL
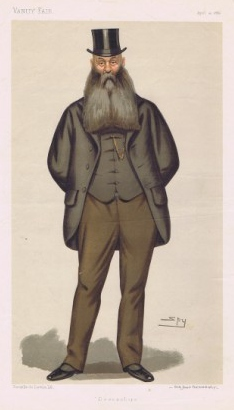
- "Devonshire"; Kennaway as caricatured by Spy (Leslie Ward) in Vanity Fair, April 1886

Member of Parliament for East Devon
- In office 9 April 1870 – 25 June 1885 Serving with Sir Lawrence Palk, Bt (1870-1880) and The Lord Waleran (1880-1885)
- Preceded by: Lord Courtenay
- Succeeded by: Constituency abolished

Member of Parliament for Honiton
- In office 26 June 1885 – 15 January 1910
- Preceded by: Constituency created
- Succeeded by: Clive Morrison-Bell

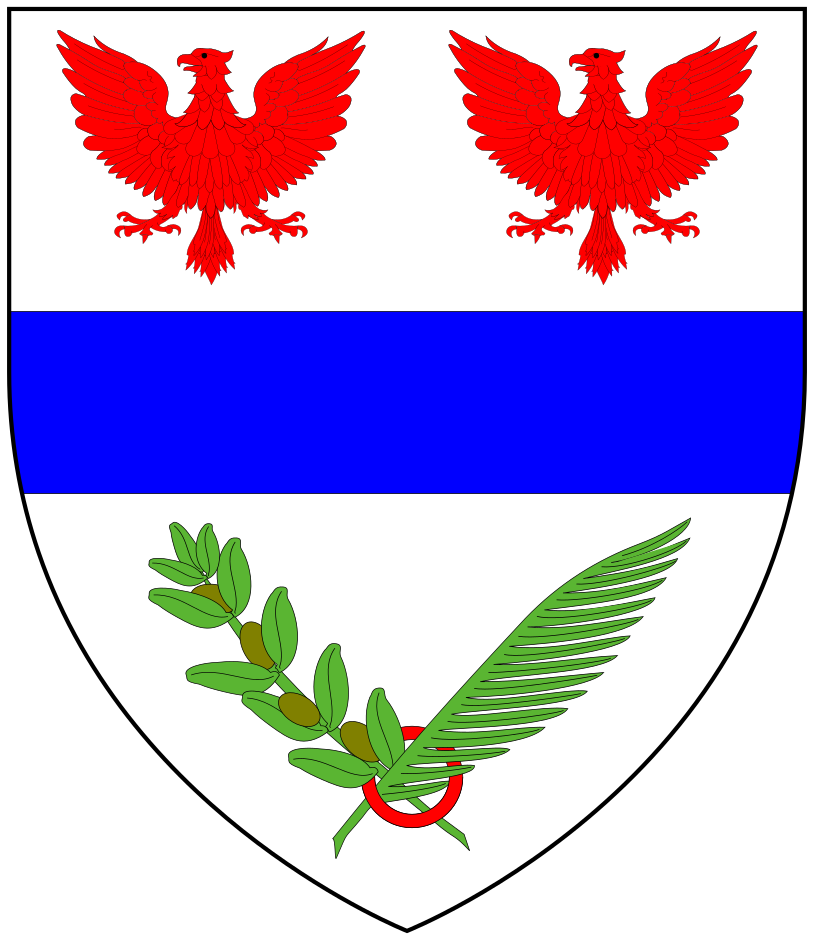
Arms of Kennaway: Argent, a fess azure between two eagles displayed in chief gules and in base through an annulet of the third a slip of olive and another of palm in saltire proper

Sir John Henry Kennaway, 3rd Baronet, CB, PC, DL (6 June 1837 – 6 September 1919) was an English Conservative Party politician.

== Early life and education ==
Kennaway was born on 6 June 1837 in Park Crescent, London, England, to Sir John Kennaway, 2nd Baronet and Emily Frances Kennaway (née Kingscote). He was educated at Harrow School, an all-boys public school in London. He studied law and modern history at Balliol College, Oxford, graduating with a first class Bachelor of Arts (BA) degree.

== Career ==
=== Political career ===
Kennaway was Member of Parliament (MP) for East Devon from 1870 to 1885, when the constituency was abolished by the Redistribution of Seats Act 1885. He was then MP for the new Honiton constituency from 1885 until the January 1910 general election.

He was made a Privy Counsellor in 1897 and appointed CB in the 1902 Coronation Honours. From 1908 to 1910 he was Father of the House of Commons.

=== Other work ===
He was called to the bar at Inner Temple in 1864. He practiced as a barrister in the western circuit.

He was a governor at the Kings School Ottery St Mary. As homage to him the school has named one of its houses after him—Kennaway.

Kennaway served as an officer in the Rifle Volunteers for forty-two years. He was commanding officer of the 3rd Volunteer Battalion, Devonshire Regiment, from 1896 to December 1902, when he was appointed its Honorary Colonel, a position he retained when it was merged into the 4th Battalion, Devonshire Regiment, in the Territorial Force in 1908.

=== Church of England ===
Kennaway was active in the Church of England. He was a low church, evangelical Anglican, who supported the temperance movement. He was a member of the Church Association which campaigned against Anglo-Catholicism, but he spoke against the Public Worship Regulation Act 1874 that would allow legal actions again ritualist priests. In 1904, he was appointed as a member of the Royal Commission on Ecclesiastical Discipline: it reported in 1906, recommending the repeal of the Public Worship Regulation Act 1874.

He served as president of the Church Missionary Society and of the London Society for Promoting Christianity Amongst the Jews.

Parliament of the United Kingdom
Preceded by Sir Lawrence Palk; Edward Baldwin Courtenay	Member of Parliament for East Devon; 1870 – 1885; With: Sir Lawrence Palk 1870–1880; William Walrond 1880–1885	Constituency abolished
New constituency	Member of Parliament for Honiton; 1885 – 1910	Succeeded by Sir Arthur Clive Morrison-Bell
Preceded by Henry Campbell-Bannerman	Father of the House; 1908 – 1910	Succeeded by Thomas Burt
Baronetage of Great Britain
Preceded by John Kennaway	Baronet (of Hyderabad); 1873 – 1919	Succeeded by John Kennaway
