= Alfred Leyman =

English painter

Alfred Leyman (27 September 1856 – 21 February 1933) was a Devon born watercolour artist whose works covered many aspects of late 19th century/ early 20th century Devonion rural life.

Alfred Leyman was born on 27 September 1856 in Exeter, Devon, England, the only son of John Francis, an artist and later a photographer, and Mary Ann Leyman. He spent much of his early life in Exeter which is where he later met, and married his wife Kate Gauntlett in 1887.

Leyman moved to Honiton in about 1888 and went on to become a teacher of art at Allhallows School, Honiton in 1893, a position he held until his death.

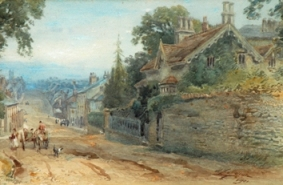
A painting of Honiton, Devon by Alfred Leyman circa 1900

Leyman did not nationally exhibit his work but did show his paintings locally, at the Annual Devon and Exeter Exhibition held at Elands Art Gallery in 1906 he displayed 16 of his pictures. He concentrated on land and seascapes but was known to have drafted portraits as well as many other scenes from Devonian life as well as a few rare examples of scenery from Dorset and Somerset.

In recent decades Leyman's works have become highly sought after and have been sold at both Bonhams and Christies in some cases reaching up to four figures.

He and his wife Kate had one child called Mary who was born in Honiton in 1887.

Leyman died in Honiton in 1933 aged 76. His daughter Mary never married and continued to live at the family home until her death in 1963.
