= Honiton (constituency) =

Former parliamentary constituency in the United Kingdom

- Former county constituency for the House of Commons
- Honiton in Devon, showing boundaries used from 1983 to 1997.
- County: Devon

1885–1997
- Seats: One
- Created from: East Devon
- Replaced by: East Devon, Tiverton and Honiton

1640–1868
- Seats: Two
- Replaced by: East Devon

Honiton was a parliamentary constituency centred on the town of Honiton in east Devon, formerly represented in the House of Commons of the Parliament of the United Kingdom. It sent members intermittently from 1300, consistently from 1640. It elected two Members of Parliament (MPs) until it was abolished in 1868. It was recreated in 1885 as a single-member constituency.

For the 1997 general election, the town of Honiton was added to the neighbouring constituency of Tiverton to form the Tiverton and Honiton constituency. The remainder continued as the East Devon constituency.

Honiton was regarded as a potwalloper borough by the time of Thomas Cochrane. It was notorious for the bribes demanded by its electors, and was therefore a very expensive seat for a candidate to seek election in. The Yonge family of Colyton, patrons of the borough, were almost ruined by representing Honiton on several occasions. Sir William Pole, 4th Baronet (1678–1741) who had twice represented Honiton at great personal financial expense, made an "earnest request and recommendation" in his will that his son would "never stand as a candidate or if chosen will never be prevailed upon to represent or serve in Parliament for the borough of Honiton".

== Boundaries ==
1885–1918: The Sessional Divisions of Axminster, Honiton, Ottery, and Woodbury.

1918–1974: The Borough of Honiton, the Urban Districts of Axminster, Budleigh Salterton, Exmouth, Ottery St Mary, Seaton, and Sidmouth, the Rural Districts of Axminster and Honiton, and part of the Rural District of St Thomas.

1974–1983: The Borough of Honiton, the Urban Districts of Budleigh Salterton, Exmouth, Ottery St Mary, Seaton, and Sidmouth, the Rural Districts of Axminster and Honiton, and part of the Rural District of St Thomas.

1983–1997: The District of East Devon wards of Axminster Hamlets, Axminster Town, Beer, Budleigh Salterton, Colyton, Edenvale, Exmouth Brixington, Exmouth Halsdon, Exmouth Littleham Rural, Exmouth Littleham Urban, Exmouth Withycombe Raleigh, Exmouth Withycombe Urban, Honiton St Michael's, Honiton St Paul's, Lympstone, Newbridges, Newton Poppleford and Harpford, Otterhead, Patteson, Raleigh, Seaton, Sidmouth Rural, Sidmouth Town, Sidmouth Woolbrook, Trinity, Upper Axe, Woodbury, and Yarty.

== Members of Parliament ==
Honiton re-enfranchised by Parliament in Nov 1640

=== MPs 1640–1660 ===
Long Parliament

- 1640–1643: William Poole (Royalist) - disabled to sit, June 1643
- 1640–1648: Walter Yonge (Parliamentarian) - not recorded as sitting after Pride's Purge, December 1648; died December 1649
- 1645(?)–1648: Charles Vaughan - excluded in Pride's Purge, December 1648

Honiton was unrepresented in the Barebones Parliament.

First Protectorate Parliament

- 1654: John Yonge

Second Protectorate Parliament

- 1656: Samuel Serle

Third Protectorate Parliament

- 1659: Walter Yonge (grandson of the Member from 1640 -1648)
- 1659: Samuel Serle

Long Parliament (restored)

- 1659–1660: Not represented

=== MPs 1660–1868 ===
Election	First member	!First party	Second member	Second party
1660	Sir John Yonge		Samuel Serle	
1661	Sir Courtenay Pole		Peter Prideaux	
1679	Sir Walter Yonge		Sir Thomas Putt	
1685	Edmond Walrond		Sir Thomas Putt	
1689	Edmond Walrond		Richard Courtenay	
1690	Sir William Drake		Sir Walter Yonge	
1711	Sir William Drake		James Sheppard	
1715	Sir William Courtenay		Sir William Yonge	Whig
1716	Sir William Pole		Sir William Yonge	Whig
1727	James Sheppard		Sir William Yonge	Whig
1731	Sir William Pole		Sir William Yonge	Whig
1734	William Courtenay		Sir William Yonge	Whig
1741	Henry Reginald Courtenay		Sir William Yonge	Whig
1747	John Heath (later John Duke)		Sir William Yonge	Whig
1754	Henry Reginald Courtenay		Sir George Yonge	
1761	Henry Reginald Courtenay		John Duke	
1763	Sir George Yonge		John Duke	
1768	Sir George Yonge		Brass Crosby	
1774	Sir George Yonge		Laurence Cox	
1780	Sir George Yonge		Alexander Macleod	
1781	Sir George Yonge		Jacob Wilkinson	
1784	Sir George Yonge		Sir George Collier	
1790	Sir George Yonge		George Templer	
1796	George Chambers		George Shum	
1802	Sir John Honywood		George Shum	
1805	Sir John Honywood		Augustus Cavendish-Bradshaw	Whig
1806 (April)	Richard Bateman-Robson		Augustus Cavendish-Bradshaw	Whig
1806 (October)	Thomas Cochrane	Whig	Augustus Cavendish-Bradshaw	Whig
1807	Sir Charles Hamilton		Augustus Cavendish-Bradshaw	Whig
1812	Richard Howard-Vyse		George Robinson	
1818	Hon. Peregrine Cust	Tory	Samuel Crawley	Whig
1826	Josiah John Guest	Whig	Harry Baines Lott	
1830	Josiah John Guest	Whig	Sir George Warrender	Tory
1831	Harry Baines Lott		Sir George Warrender	Tory
1832	George Child-Villiers	Tory	James Ruddell-Todd	Whig
1834	George Child-Villiers	Conservative	James Ruddell-Todd	Whig
1835	Hugh Duncan Baillie	Conservative	Arthur Chichester	Conservative
1837	Hugh Duncan Baillie	Conservative	James Stewart	Whig
1841	Hugh Duncan Baillie	Conservative	Forster Alleyne McGeachy	Conservative
1847	Joseph Locke	Whig	Sir James Hogg 1st Bt	Conservative
1857	Joseph Locke	Whig	Archibald Stuart-Wortley	Conservative
1859	Joseph Locke	Liberal	Alexander Baillie-Cochrane	Conservative
1860	George Moffatt	Liberal	Alexander Baillie-Cochrane	Conservative
1865	Frederick Goldsmid	Liberal	Alexander Baillie-Cochrane	Conservative
1866	Julian Goldsmid	Liberal	Alexander Baillie-Cochrane	Conservative
1868	Constituency abolished, but re-established in 1885			

=== MPs 1885–1997 ===
Election	Member	Party	Notes
1885	John Kennaway	Conservative	
Jan 1910	Clive Morrison-Bell	Conservative	
1931	Cedric Drewe	Conservative	
1955	Robert Mathew	Conservative	Died 1966
1967 by-election	Peter Emery	Conservative	
1997	constituency abolished: see Tiverton and Honiton & Devon East		

== Election results ==
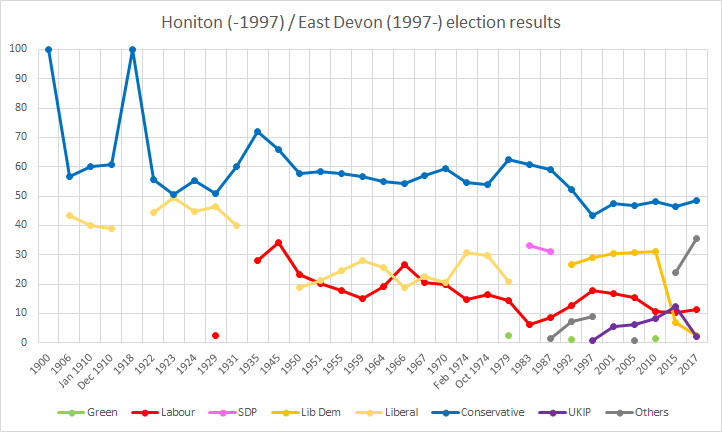
East Devon election results

=== Elections in the 1830s ===
General election 1830: Honiton
Party	Candidate	Votes	%
Whig	John Josiah Guest	Unopposed	
Tory	George Warrender	Unopposed	
Whig hold			
Tory gain from Nonpartisan			

General election 1831: Honiton
Party	Candidate	Votes	%
Tory	George Warrender	319	36.7
Nonpartisan	Harry Baines Lott	283	32.6
Whig	John Josiah Guest	259	29.8
Radical	John Thomas Mayne	8	0.9
Turnout		492	c. 96.5
Registered electors		c. 510	
Majority		36	4.1
Tory hold			
Majority		24	2.8
Nonpartisan gain from Whig			

General election 1832: Honiton
Party	Candidate	Votes	%	±%
Tory	George Child Villiers	360	46.6	+28.3
Whig	James Ruddell-Todd	302	39.1	+9.3
Tory	James Peel Cockburn	110	14.2	−4.2
Turnout		492	96.3	c. −0.2
Registered electors		511		
Majority		58	7.5	+3.4
Tory hold		Swing	+11.8	
Majority		192	24.9	N/A
Whig gain from Nonpartisan		Swing	−1.4	

General election 1835: Honiton
Party	Candidate	Votes	%	±%
Conservative	Hugh Duncan Baillie	332	42.6	−4.0
Conservative	Arthur Chichester	226	29.0	+14.8
Whig	James Ruddell-Todd	221	28.4	−10.7
Majority		5	0.6	−6.9
Turnout		446	94.7	−1.6
Registered electors		471		
Conservative hold		Swing	+0.7	
Conservative gain from Whig		Swing	+10.1	

General election 1837: Honiton
Party	Candidate	Votes	%	±%
Conservative	Hugh Duncan Baillie	294	40.7	−1.9
Whig	James Stewart	225	31.2	+2.8
Conservative	Alexander Grant	203	28.1	−0.9
Turnout		435	94.6	−0.1
Registered electors		460		
Majority		69	9.5	+8.9
Conservative hold		Swing	−1.7	
Majority		22	3.1	N/A
Whig gain from Conservative		Swing	+2.8	

=== Elections in the 1840s ===
General election 1841: Honiton
Party	Candidate	Votes	%	±%
Conservative	Hugh Duncan Baillie	Unopposed		
Conservative	Forster Alleyne McGeachy	Unopposed		
Registered electors		440		
Conservative hold				
Conservative gain from Whig				

General election 1847: Honiton
Party	Candidate	Votes	%	±%
Conservative	James Hogg	Unopposed		
Whig	Joseph Locke	Unopposed		
Registered electors		446		
Conservative hold				
Whig gain from Conservative				

=== Elections in the 1850s ===
General election 1852: Honiton
Party	Candidate	Votes	%	±%
Whig	Joseph Locke	166	37.6	N/A
Conservative	James Hogg	152	34.5	N/A
Conservative	Richard Gard	123	27.9	N/A
Majority		14	3.1	N/A
Turnout		221 (est)	76.8 (est)	N/A
Registered electors		287		
Whig hold		Swing	N/A	
Conservative hold		Swing	N/A	

General election 1857: Honiton
Party	Candidate	Votes	%	±%
Whig	Joseph Locke	214	47.6	+10.0
Conservative	Archibald Stuart-Wortley	119	26.4	−1.5
Conservative	James Hogg	117	26.0	−8.5
Majority		95	21.2	+18.1
Turnout		225 (est)	85.2 (est)	+8.4
Registered electors		264		
Whig hold		Swing	+10.0	
Conservative hold		Swing	−6.8	

General election 1859: Honiton
Party	Candidate	Votes	%	±%
Liberal	Joseph Locke	Unopposed		
Conservative	Alexander Baillie-Cochrane	Unopposed		
Registered electors		287		
Liberal hold				
Conservative hold				

=== Elections in the 1860s ===
Locke's death caused a by-election.

By-election, 22 October 1860: Honiton
Party	Candidate	Votes	%	±%
Liberal	George Moffatt	Unopposed		
Liberal hold				

General election 1865: Honiton
Party	Candidate	Votes	%	±%
Liberal	Frederick Goldsmid	171	42.9	N/A
Conservative	Alexander Baillie-Cochrane	140	35.1	N/A
Liberal	Evan Matthew Richards	88	22.1	N/A
Turnout		200 (est)	74.7 (est)	N/A
Registered electors		267		
Majority		31	7.8	N/A
Liberal hold		Swing	N/A	
Majority		52	13.0	N/A
Conservative hold		Swing	N/A	

Goldsmid's death caused a by-election.

By-election, 28 March 1866: Honiton
Party	Candidate	Votes	%	±%
Liberal	Julian Goldsmid	Unopposed		
Liberal hold				

In 1868, the seat was absorbed into East Devon. It was later recreated for 1885.

=== Elections in the 1880s ===
General election 1885: Honiton
Party	Candidate	Votes	%	±%
Conservative	John Kennaway	4,540	60.6	
Liberal	John Budd Phear	2,957	39.4	
Majority		1,583	21.2	
Turnout		7,497	83.2	
Registered electors		9,012		
Conservative win (new seat)				

General election 1886: Honiton
Party	Candidate	Votes	%	±%
Conservative	John Kennaway	Unopposed		
Conservative hold				

=== Elections in the 1890s ===
General election 1892: Honiton
Party	Candidate	Votes	%	±%
Conservative	John Kennaway	4,591	64.2	N/A
Liberal	William Hickman Smith Aubrey	2,565	35.8	New
Majority		2,026	28.4	N/A
Turnout		7,156	78.1	N/A
Registered electors		9,167		
Conservative hold		Swing	N/A	

General election 1895: Honiton
Party	Candidate	Votes	%	±%
Conservative	John Kennaway	Unopposed		
Conservative hold				

=== Elections in the 1900s ===
General election 1900: Honiton
Party	Candidate	Votes	%	±%
Conservative	John Kennaway	Unopposed		
Conservative hold				

Luke

General election 1906: Honiton
Party	Candidate	Votes	%	±%
Conservative	John Kennaway	4,854	56.7	N/A
Liberal	William Balkwill Luke	3,711	43.3	New
Majority		1,143	13.4	N/A
Turnout		8,565	87.4	N/A
Registered electors		9,797		
Conservative hold		Swing	N/A	

=== Elections in the 1910s ===
General election January 1910: Honiton
Party	Candidate	Votes	%	±%
Conservative	Clive Morrison-Bell	5,604	60.0	+3.3
Liberal	William Balkwill Luke	3,733	40.0	−3.3
Majority		1,871	20.0	+6.6
Turnout		9,337	88.7	+1.3
Registered electors		10,522		
Conservative hold		Swing	+3.3	

General election December 1910: Honiton
Party	Candidate	Votes	%	±%
Conservative	Clive Morrison-Bell	5,348	60.9	+0.9
Liberal	Harry Geen	3,439	39.1	−0.9
Majority		1,909	21.8	+1.8
Turnout		8,787	83.5	−5.2
Registered electors		10,522		
Conservative hold		Swing	+0.9	

General Election 1914–15:

Another General Election was required to take place before the end of 1915. The political parties had been making preparations for an election to take place and by July 1914, the following candidates had been selected;

- Unionist: Clive Morrison-Bell
- Liberal:

General election 1918: Honiton
Party		Candidate	Votes	%	±%
C	Unionist	Clive Morrison-Bell	Unopposed		
	Unionist hold				
C indicates candidate endorsed by the coalition government.

=== Elections in the 1920s ===
Halse

General election 1922: Honiton
Party	Candidate	Votes	%	±%
Unionist	Clive Morrison-Bell	12,972	55.5	N/A
Liberal	John George Hawkins Halse	10,404	44.5	New
Majority		2,568	11.0	N/A
Turnout		23,376	79.1	N/A
Registered electors		29,546		
Unionist hold		Swing	N/A	

General election 1923: Honiton
Party	Candidate	Votes	%	±%
Unionist	Clive Morrison-Bell	12,470	50.6	−4.9
Liberal	John George Hawkins Halse	12,177	49.4	+4.9
Majority		293	1.2	−9.8
Turnout		24,647	81.0	+1.9
Registered electors		30,443		
Unionist hold		Swing	−4.9	

General election 1924: Honiton
Party	Candidate	Votes	%	±%
Unionist	Clive Morrison-Bell	14,804	55.2	+4.6
Liberal	John George Hawkins Halse	12,025	44.8	−4.6
Majority		2,779	10.4	+9.2
Turnout		26,829	85.5	+4.5
Registered electors		31,388		
Unionist hold		Swing	+4.6	

General election 1929: Honiton
Party	Candidate	Votes	%	±%
Unionist	Clive Morrison-Bell	17,911	50.9	−4.3
Liberal	John George Hawkins Halse	16,353	46.5	+1.7
Labour	Rose Davies	915	2.6	New
Majority		1,558	4.4	−6.0
Turnout		35,179	84.3	−1.2
Registered electors		41,723		
Unionist hold		Swing	−3.0	

=== Elections in the 1930s ===
General election 1931: Honiton
Party	Candidate	Votes	%	±%
Conservative	Cedric Drewe	21,854	60.0	+9.1
Liberal	John George Hawkins Halse	14,563	40.0	−6.5
Majority		7,291	20.0	+15.6
Turnout		36,417	83.5	−0.8
Conservative hold		Swing	+7.8	

General election 1935: Honiton
Party	Candidate	Votes	%	±%
Conservative	Cedric Drewe	22,805	71.9	+11.9
Labour	J R Morris	8,916	28.1	New
Majority		13,889	43.8	+23.8
Turnout		31,721	69.6	−13.9
Conservative hold		Swing	N/A	

=== Elections in the 1940s ===
General Election 1939–40: Another General Election was required to take place before the end of 1940. The political parties had been making preparations for an election to take place from 1939 and by the end of this year, the following candidates had been selected;

- Conservative: Cedric Drewe
- Labour: J White

General election 1945: Honiton
Party	Candidate	Votes	%	±%
Conservative	Cedric Drewe	24,499	65.8	−6.1
Labour	Henry Thomas Langdon	12,739	34.2	+6.1
Majority		11,760	31.6	−12.2
Turnout		37,238	70.3	+0.7
Conservative hold		Swing	-6.1	

=== Elections in the 1950s ===
General election 1950: Honiton
Party	Candidate	Votes	%	±%
Conservative	Cedric Drewe	26,767	57.78	
Labour	GR Sargeant	10,816	23.35	
Liberal	Guy Barrington	8,742	18.87	New
Majority		15,951	34.43	
Turnout		46,295	84.43	
Conservative hold		Swing		

General election 1951: Honiton
Party	Candidate	Votes	%	±%
Conservative	Cedric Drewe	27,015	58.42	
Liberal	John B Halse	9,858	21.32	
Labour	Norman L Stevens	9,369	20.26	
Majority		17,157	37.10	
Turnout		46,242	82.54	
Conservative hold		Swing		

General election 1955: Honiton
Party	Candidate	Votes	%	±%
Conservative	Robert Mathew	25,808	57.63	
Liberal	John B Halse	11,067	24.71	
Labour	Frederick W Thornton	7,907	17.66	
Majority		14,741	32.92	
Turnout		44,782	79.68	
Conservative hold		Swing		

General election 1959: Honiton
Party	Candidate	Votes	%	±%
Conservative	Robert Mathew	25,959	56.69	
Liberal	John B Halse	12,906	28.18	
Labour	Frederick W Morgan	6,928	15.13	
Majority		13,053	28.51	
Turnout		45,793	80.10	
Conservative hold		Swing		

=== Elections in the 1960s ===
General election 1964: Honiton
Party	Candidate	Votes	%	±%
Conservative	Robert Mathew	26,475	55.04	
Liberal	Warwick Deal	12,354	25.68	
Labour	Marjorie Clark	9,273	19.28	
Majority		14,121	29.36	
Turnout		48,102	78.77	
Conservative hold		Swing		

General election 1966: Honiton
Party	Candidate	Votes	%	±%
Conservative	Robert Mathew	26,966	54.4	−0.6
Labour	Marjorie Clark	13,257	26.7	+7.4
Liberal	Raymond Hicks	9,342	18.9	−6.8
Majority		13,707	27.7	−1.7
Turnout		49,565	78.6	−0.2
Conservative hold		Swing		

1967 Honiton by-election
Party	Candidate	Votes	%	±%
Conservative	Peter Emery	26,501	57.0	+2.6
Liberal	Bridget Trethewey	10,509	22.6	+3.7
Labour	Marjorie Clark	9,501	20.4	−6.3
Majority		15,992	34.4	+6.7
Turnout		46,511	72.6	−6.0
Conservative hold		Swing	-0.7	

=== Elections in the 1970s ===
General election 1970: Honiton
Party	Candidate	Votes	%	±%
Conservative	Peter Emery	32,885	59.48	
Liberal	Bridget Trethewey	11,330	20.49	
Labour	Malyn DD Newitt	11,072	20.03	
Majority		21,555	38.99	
Turnout		55,287	76.66	
Conservative hold		Swing		

General election February 1974: Honiton
Party	Candidate	Votes	%	±%
Conservative	Peter Emery	32,429	54.48	
Liberal	Victor Howell	18,306	30.75	
Labour	Malyn DD Newitt	8,791	14.77	
Majority		14,123	23.73	
Turnout		59,526	81.98	
Conservative hold		Swing		

General election October 1974: Honiton
Party	Candidate	Votes	%	±%
Conservative	Peter Emery	29,720	53.77	
Liberal	Victor Howell	16,500	29.85	
Labour	RL Spiller	9,048	16.37	
Majority		13,220	23.92	
Turnout		55,268	75.64	
Conservative hold		Swing		

General election 1979: Honiton
Party	Candidate	Votes	%	±%
Conservative	Peter Emery	37,832	62.42	
Liberal	R Ruffle	12,601	20.79	
Labour	T Luesby	8,756	14.45	
Ecology	MH Bacon	1,423	2.35	New
Majority		25,231	41.63	
Turnout		60,612	77.41	
Conservative hold		Swing		

=== Elections in the 1980s ===
General election 1983: Honiton
Party	Candidate	Votes	%	±%
Conservative	Peter Emery	32,602	60.58	
SDP	Alistair Sampson	17,833	33.14	
Labour	Raymond Sharpe	3,377	6.28	
Majority		14,769	27.44	
Turnout		53,812	74.50	
Conservative hold		Swing		

General election 1987: Honiton
Party	Candidate	Votes	%	±%
Conservative	Peter Emery	34,931	59.2	−1.4
SDP	Gerald Tatton-Brown	18,369	31.1	−2.0
Labour	Simon Pollentine	4,988	8.5	+2.2
Monster Raving Loony	Stuart Hughes	747	1.3	New
Majority		16,562	28.05	+0.6
Turnout		59,035	76.41	+1.91
Conservative hold		Swing		

=== Elections in the 1990s ===
General election 1992: Honiton
Party	Candidate	Votes	%	±%
Conservative	Peter Emery	33,533	52.4	−6.8
Liberal Democrats	JM Sharratt	17,022	26.6	−4.5
Labour	R Davison	8,142	12.7	+4.2
Ind. Conservative	DA Owen	2,175	3.4	New
Raving Loony Green Giant	Stuart Basil Fawlty Hughes	1,442	2.3	New
Liberal	Gerald Halliwell	1,005	1.6	New
Green	Alan Tootill	650	1.0	New
Majority		16,511	25.8	−2.2
Turnout		63,969	80.7	+4.3
Conservative hold		Swing	−1.1	

== See also ==
- parliamentary constituencies in Devon
