= Robert Mathew =

20th-century British politician

Robert Mathew TD (9 May 1911 – 8 December 1966) was a British barrister and politician.

== Early life ==
From a military family (his father was Major-General Charles Mathew), Mathew went to Eton College and Trinity College, Cambridge. He read for the Bar and was called (Lincoln's Inn) in 1937. He joined the Territorial Army in the King's Royal Rifle Corps and during the Second World War served in Italy and Greece as well as at the Staff College.

=== Wartime service ===
While serving in a troubled Athens at Christmas 1944 he was sent to escort Prime Minister Winston Churchill, who had arrived in HMS Ajax, to the British Embassy for meetings. Just before Churchill climbed, laboriously, into an armoured car at the dock, a 75 mm shell fired by Communist insurgents landed within 25 feet. When Mathew explained what it was, '...[a] slow and pleased grin came into his face: "What! Shelling me - damned cheek!" he said. The smell of grapeshot had swept away all the weariness of long Cabinet meetings and the dusty government offices in London; he was a young officer again. As we drove through the machine-gun fire towards central Athens I told him that my father nearly 50 years before had also been under fire with him at the Battle of Omdurman. That pleased the old lion.'

When they reached the Embassy Churchill lingered on the steps to give a Victory salute to a bystander. Mathew, knowing that the Prime Minister was in range of Communist snipers, was horrified and urged him on, explaining that it was a hot spot and that a man had been killed on the steps that morning; when Churchill still did not move Mathew 'pushed him physically up the steps, saying "Sir, I am responsible for your safety and I order you indoors." He have me a fierce thunderous look, which I shall never forget.'

Later accounts claim that after Mathew forcefully pushed Churchill over the threshold, the two men ended in a heap on the floor; and that Churchill then asked whether Mathew normally pushed Prime Ministers around, to which Mathew replied: 'Sir, I’d rather have an angry prime minister than a dead one.'

Mathew ended the war with the rank of lieutenant-colonel.

== Political career ==
He was demobilized early as a Parliamentary candidate, fighting South Ayrshire for the Conservative Party in the 1945 general election. He fought the same seat in a 1946 byelection, having in the meantime been elected to Chelsea Borough Council for Hans Town ward. He fought Rochester and Chatham in the elections of 1950 and 1951, a potentially winnable seat.

Mathew was chosen for the safe seat of Honiton and won it in the 1955 general election. When he took his seat in the House of Commons, he tripped over Churchill's out-stretched legs and fell to the ground. Churchill turned to see who it was and said: "Oh God, Mathew, not you again!"

Derek Walker-Smith, who served as Minister for Health, picked him as his Parliamentary Private Secretary from 1957 to 1960.

Although a backbencher, Mathew's views were regarded as important; his strong support for British membership of the European Economic Community when the Macmillan government applied for membership did much to solidify Conservative opinion.

From 30 January to 16 October 1964 he was Parliamentary Under-Secretary for Foreign Affairs.

Mathew died in his sleep in December 1966 at the early age of 55. He and his wife had three sons, Robin (later KC), Charles and David.

Parliament of the United Kingdom
Preceded by Sir Cedric Drewe	Member of Parliament for Honiton; 1955–1966	Succeeded by Peter Emery
