= Joseph Marryat (1757–1824) =

British merchant, banker and politician (1757–1824)

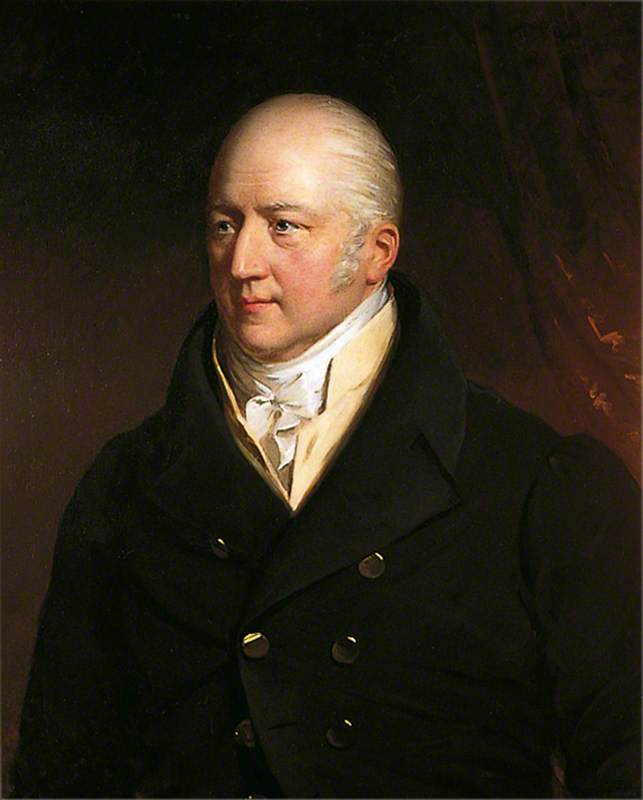
c. 1810 portrait of Marryat

Joseph Marryat (8 October 1757 – 12 January 1824) was a British merchant, banker and politician who served as a MP for Sandwich from 1812 until his death in 1824. He was a slave-owner and a strong opponent of abolitionism.

== Family ==
Of Huguenot descent, his father was the medical writer and physician Thomas Marryat. Marryat's wife, the American Charlotte von Geyer (died 1854), was one of the first women admitted to membership of the Royal Horticultural Society, on the strength of her garden at Wimbledon House. They lived at Malvern House, in Sydenham, Kent, and at Wimbledon House, Surrey, and had 15 children, of whom six died young. His sons included Joseph Marryat (1790–1876), who like his father was the MP for Sandwich, serving from 1826 to 1834. Frederick Marryat became a Royal Navy officer and a noted novelist, while Horace Marryat became a travel writer, notably on Scandinavia. The younger Joseph and Charles Marryat inherited hundreds of slaves from their father after he died in January 1824.

== Parliament ==
Marryat sat as a member of Parliament in the House of Commons for 16 years. At the general election of 1807, he was initially defeated at Horsham, but successfully petitioned against the result and entered the House in February 1808. At the general elections of 1812 and 1818, he was elected unopposed at Sandwich, representing the town until his death in January 1824.

Marryat soon established himself as an active parliamentary speaker on colonial, maritime and commercial issues. He never formally supported any party, indicating to the Sandwich electors in 1812 that despite "a disposition to give due support to those to whom the administration of public affairs is confided", he was "not enlisted under the banners of any party".

== Slavery and business interests ==
In the mid-1780s Marryat migrated to Grenada and lived there until 1791, when he returned to London. Becoming prosperous as a merchant, he invested in West Indian plantations and became an absentee slaveowner in Jamaica, St. Lucia, Trinidad, and Grenada. While in Grenada, Marryat had an illegitimate daughter named Ann by a slave woman, both of whom he freed before leaving the island. Ann Marryat later became a slave owner herself, receiving over £500 compensation on freeing her 13 slaves in 1837.

An ardent opponent of abolitionism, Marryat initially supported the maintenance of the Atlantic slave trade and in February 1807, as agent for Trinidad, petitioned the House of Commons against a ban. However, after the trade's abolition in May 1807, and now an MP, he supported Henry Brougham's 1810 and 1811 motions for measures to suppress the foreign slave trade, while remaining a firm supporter of slave ownership and using his position in Parliament to promote the interests of West Indian sugar producers. He contested William Wilberforce's proposed registry of slaves, arguing that enforced abolition would "ruin the West Indian colonies". He also engaged in polemic debate by issuing pamphlets and lobbying his peers as a prominent member of the London Society of West India Planters and Merchants.

His 1818 pamphlet entitled ‘More thoughts still on the state of the West India Colonies and the proceedings on the African Institution with observations on the speech of James Stephen Esq.’ inspired George Cruikshank's infamous satirical print The New Union Club, described as "one of the most racist and most complex prints of the 19th century."

Marryat, also a shipowner, helped to develop the London Dock Company, and served as chair of Lloyd's from 1811 until his death. He joined the London bank of Sir Charles Price, based at 1 Mansion House Street in the City of London. It became known as Marryat, Kay, Price and Coleman once he became head of the firm in the 1820s.

== Publications ==
- Thoughts on the Abolition of the Slave Trade, and civilization of Africa, with remarks on the African Institution and an examination of the report of their Committee, etc. (1816) London: J. M. Richardson and J. Ridgway
- More thoughts occasioned by two publications which the authors call "An exposure of some of the numerous misstatements and misrepresentations contained in a pamphlet commonly known by the name of Mr. Marryat's pamphlet, entitled Thoughts &c.", and "A defence of the bill for the registration of slaves", (1816) London: J. M. Richardson and J. Ridgway

Parliament of the United Kingdom
| Preceded by Samuel Romilly; Love Jones-Parry | Member of Parliament for Horsham; 1808–1812; With: Henry Goulburn | Succeeded by Sir Arthur Leary Piggott; Robert Hurst |
| Preceded by Charles Jenkinson; John Spratt Rainier | Member of Parliament for Sandwich; 1812–1824; With: Sir Joseph Sydney Yorke (1812-1818); Sir George Warrender (1818-1824) | Succeeded by Henry Bonham; Sir George Warrender |
