= 1967 Honiton by-election =

UK parliamentary by-election

The 1967 Honiton by-election was a by-election held for the UK House of Commons constituency of Honiton in Devon on 16 March 1967. It was won by the Conservative Party candidate Peter Emery.

== Vacancy ==
The seat had become vacant when the Conservative Member of Parliament (MP), Robert Mathew had died on 8 December 1966. He had held the seat since the 1955 general election and had served as parliamentary private secretary to Derek Walker-Smith.

== Result ==
The result was a clear victory for Emery, who returned to the Commons after losing his seat at Reading in 1966.

Emery held the seat, and its successor East Devon until the 2001 general election.

== Votes of by-election and previous general election ==
Honiton by-election, 1967
Party	Candidate	Votes	%	±%
Conservative	Peter Emery	26,501	57.0	+2.6
Liberal	Bridget Trethewey	10,509	22.6	+3.9
Labour	Marjorie Clark	9,501	20.4	−6.3
Majority		15,992	34.4	+6.7
Turnout		46,511	72.6	−6.0
Conservative hold		Swing	-0.7	

General election 1966: Honiton
Party	Candidate	Votes	%	±%
Conservative	Robert Mathew	26,966	54.4	−0.6
Labour	Marjorie Clark	13,257	26.7	+7.4
Liberal	R. Hicks	9,342	18.9	−6.8
Majority		13,707	27.7	−1.7
Turnout		49,565	78.6	−0.2
Conservative hold		Swing		

== See also ==
- Honiton constituency
- List of United Kingdom by-elections
