= Honiton pottery =

Earthenware pottery from Devon, England

Honiton pottery is a type of earthenware pottery from Honiton, Devon, England. The popular design was Jacobean, and the most famous designer was Charles Collard who learned his trade at the Aller Vale Pottery in Kingskerswell. Its heyday was in the 1930s.
