= Alexander Macleod (MP) =

British politician

Alexander Norman Macleod (c. 1715–1790), of Harris, Inverness and Theobalds, Hertfordshire, was a British politician.

He was a member (MP) of the parliament of Great Britain for Honiton 1780 - 27 March 1781.
