= 1870 East Devon by-election =

UK Parliamentary by-election

The 1870 East Devon by-election was fought on 9 April 1870. The by-election was fought due to the resignation of the incumbent Conservative MP Lord Courtenay. It was won unopposed by the Conservative candidate John Henry Kennaway.
