= Clive Morrison-Bell =

British Army officer and politician (1871–1956)

- Born: Arthur Clive Morrison-Bell; 19 April 1871; England
- Died: 16 April 1956 (aged 99); England
- Education: Eton and the Royal Military College, Sandhurst,
- Occupations: Serviceman and parliamentarian
- Spouse: Lilah Katherine Julia Wingfield
- Relatives: Shelagh and Patricia (daughters)

Sir Arthur Clive Morrison-Bell, 1st Baronet (19 April 1871 – 16 April 1956), known as Clive Morrison-Bell, was a British soldier and Conservative Party parliamentarian.

== Biography ==
Arthur was the son of Sir Charles Morrison-Bell, 1st Baronet and Louisa Maria Dawes.

He was educated at Eton and the Royal Military College, Sandhurst, and was commissioned in the Scots Guards in 1890. He served in the Boer War. In 1905, his father was created a Baronet. That same year the family assumed by Royal licence the additional surname and arms of Morrison in 1905, for Charles' mother, Mary Wilhelmina Morrison, the daughter and heiress of Royal Navy officer John Morrison.

Arthur was promoted Major in 1908, and retired from the army the same year.

At the general election of January 1910, Morrison-Bell was elected member of parliament (MP) for Honiton. In 1914, he rejoined the army at the beginning of the First World War, was captured in 1915 and returned to England in 1918.

Morrison-Bell held the seat without a break until 1931, when he retired due to ill-health. He was created a baronet in the 1923 Birthday Honours.

== Personal life ==
In 1912 Morrison-Bell married Hon. Lilah Katherine Julia Wingfield, daughter of Mervyn Wingfield, 7th Viscount Powerscourt. They had two daughters, Shelagh and Patricia, with a third daughter dying in infancy. Shelagh married Sir Ralph Abercromby Campbell, Chief Justice of the Bahamas, in 1968.

The baronetcy became extinct when he died in 1956.

== Arms ==
Coat of arms of Morrison-Bell of Harpford
Crest 1st, A falcon close Proper belled and jessed Or, holding in the beak a bell Argent (Bell); 2nd, In front of a Moor's head couped at the shoulders as in the arms, three roses Gules (Morrison). Escutcheon Quarterly, 1st and 4th: Sable, on a fesse Ermine between tree bells Argent, a falcon close between two crescents of the First (Bell); 2nd and 3rd: Argent, on a fesse Azure, between three Moors' heads couped at the neck Proper, the turbans Vert turned up Argent, three roses Or (Morrison). Motto Perseverantia (Perseverance)

Parliament of the United Kingdom
Preceded by Sir John Kennaway	Member of Parliament for Honiton; Jan. 1910–1931	Succeeded by Cedric Drewe
Baronetage of the United Kingdom
New creation	Baronet (of Harpford); 1923–1956	Extinct
