= Peter Emery =

British politician

The Right Honourable Sir Peter Emery

Member of Parliament for East Devon Honiton (1967–1997)
- In office 16 March 1967 – 14 May 2001
- Preceded by: Robert Mathew
- Succeeded by: Hugo Swire

Member of Parliament for Reading
- In office 8 October 1959 – 10 March 1966
- Preceded by: Ian Mikardo
- Succeeded by: John Lee

Personal details
- Born: Peter Frank Hannibal Emery; 27 February 1926 London, England
- Died: 9 December 2004 (aged 78)
- Party: Conservative
- Education: Scotch Plains-Fanwood High School
- Alma mater: Oriel College, Oxford

Military service
- Allegiance: United Kingdom
- Branch/service: Royal Air Force

Sir Peter Frank Hannibal Emery (27 February 1926 – 9 December 2004) was a British Conservative Party politician.

== Early life ==
Emery was born in London, but was evacuated to the United States during World War II. He was educated at Scotch Plains-Fanwood High School in New Jersey, graduating in 1943, before serving with the Royal Air Force. He attended Oriel College, Oxford. While at Oriel he founded the political group United Europe with Edward Boyle, Peter Kirk, and Dick Taverne. He was librarian of the Oxford Union.

Emery was a councillor on Hornsey Borough Council, chairing the housing committee. He was a school governor and a member of the executive committee of the London Municipal Society.

== Parliamentary career ==
He stood for Parliament without success in Poplar at the 1951 general election and Lincoln. He first gained a seat in parliament at the 1959 general election, when he famously ousted trade unionist Ian Mikardo—of whose union Emery was a member—from his Reading seat. He became a founding member of the Bow Group. In the 1964 general election, his majority was just 10 votes.

After being defeated in Reading in the 1966 general election, Emery returned the following year by winning a by-election in Honiton. He represented that seat and its successor East Devon until stepping down at the 2001 general election, having served 40 years in Parliament. He was made a Privy Counsellor in 1993.

Emery spent most of his long political career as a backbencher, although he did serve as a junior Energy minister under Edward Heath, which included oversight of the notorious three day week and, during his final term, served as treasurer of the powerful 1922 Committee. Emery was a freemason.

Parliament of the United Kingdom
Preceded by Ian Mikardo	Member of Parliament for Reading; 1959–1966	Succeeded by John Lee
Preceded by Robert Mathew	Member of Parliament for Honiton; 1967–1997	Constituency abolished
New constituency	Member of Parliament for East Devon; 1997–2001	Succeeded by Hugo Swire
