= Honiton =

Town in Devon, England

Coordinates: 50.80°N 3.19°W

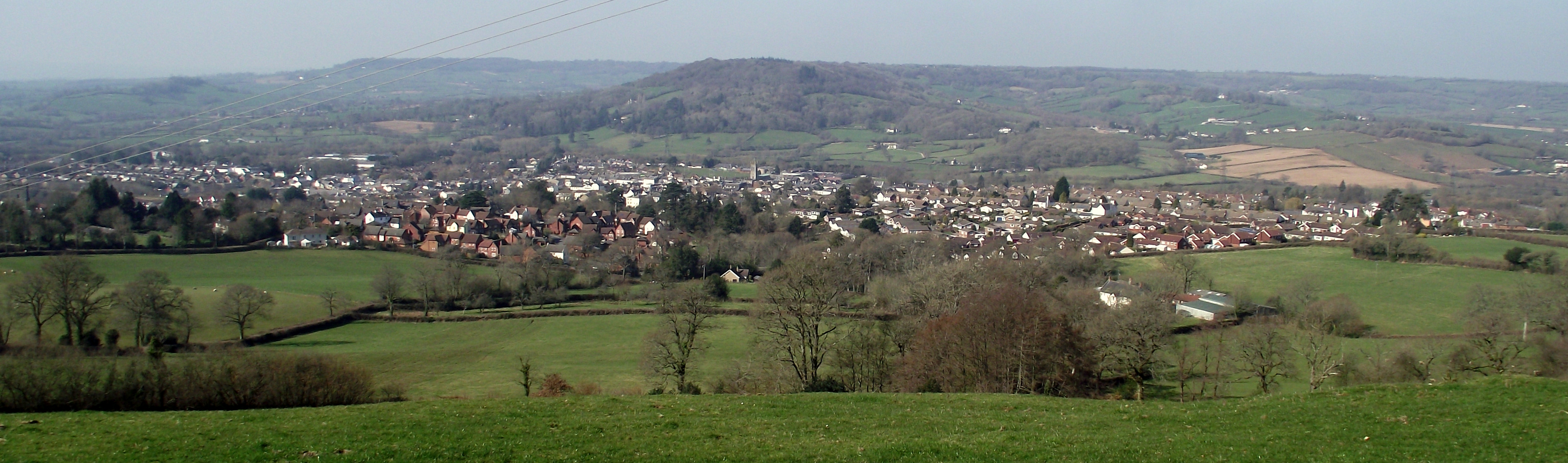
- Honiton

- Location within Devon
- Population: 12,154 (2021)
- OS grid reference: ST164004
- Civil parish: Honiton
- District: East Devon
- Shire county: Devon
- Region: South West
- Country: England
- Sovereign state: United Kingdom
- Post town: HONITON
- Postcode district: EX14
- Dialling code: 01404
- Police: Devon and Cornwall
- Fire: Devon and Somerset
- Ambulance: South Western
- UK Parliament: Honiton and Sidmouth
- Website: www.honiton.gov.uk

Honiton (/ˈhʌnitən/ or /ˈhɒnitən/) is a market town and civil parish in East Devon, situated close to the River Otter, 17 miles (27 km) north east of Exeter in the county of Devon. Honiton has a population estimated at 12,154 (based on 2021 census).

== History ==
The town grew along the line of the Fosse Way, the ancient Roman road linking Exeter (Isca Dumnoniorum) to Lincoln (Lindum). Contrary to 19th-century theories, it is unlikely to have been known as a stopping-point by the Romans, who built a small fort for that purpose just to the west of the present town. Honiton's location is mentioned in the Domesday Book as Honetone, meaning Huna's tun or farmstead.

=== Lace-making ===
Honiton later grew to become an important market town, known for lace making that was introduced by Flemish immigrants in the Elizabethan era. In the 17th century thousands of people produced lace by hand in their homes. In the 19th century the lace trim on Queen Victoria's wedding dress was made of Honiton lace, though the lace itself was made in the fishing village of Beer. The town also became known for its pottery.

=== Fires ===
In 1747 and 1765 the town was badly damaged by fires. Georgian houses were then built to replace some of those that had been destroyed.

== Landmarks ==
The buildings of High Street are almost all Georgian, dating from after the two fires of 1747 and 1765. Of particular interest are Marwood House, 1619, and the Manor House, which was originally a coaching inn (the added porch is 19th-century). Honiton Garage dates from about 1700 and the Market Hall (which originally had arcades on the ground floor and an assembly room above) has a modest early-19th-century stone front.

=== Churches ===
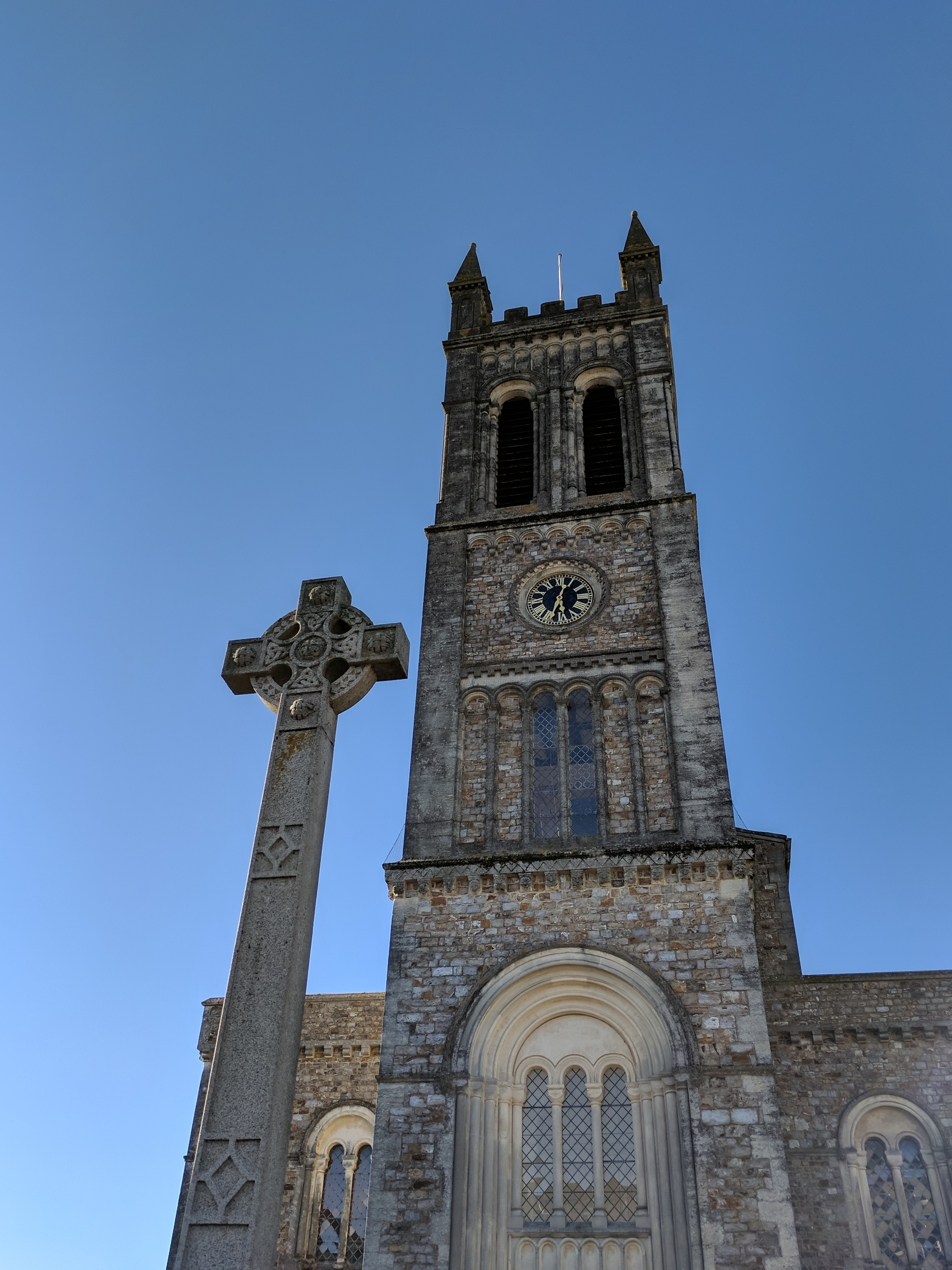
St Paul's Church in the early evening

St Michael's Parish Church, which was rebuilt in 1911 after a fire, is situated on a small hill above the town. The old church was large and perfectly rectangular: it was built in the Perpendicular style, with two aisles, two transepts (which did not project), and the chancel and two chancel chapels equal to it in length. The west tower and the outer walls are all that remains of the old building. The cost of the original building was paid by Bishop Courtenay of Exeter, lord of the manor of Honiton (west part) and by John and Joan Takell (east part).

The mid-19th-century St Paul's Church was designed by Charles Fowler and is situated in the centre of the town. Its erection in 1835 required an act of Parliament and the demolition of half of the adjacent Allhallows Chapel. It was built in 1837–38 in a style incorporating elements of Romanesque architecture. There are pinnacles on the tower and the arcades inside have tall columns; above the nave is a clerestory which resembles those in early Christian basilicas.

=== Museum ===
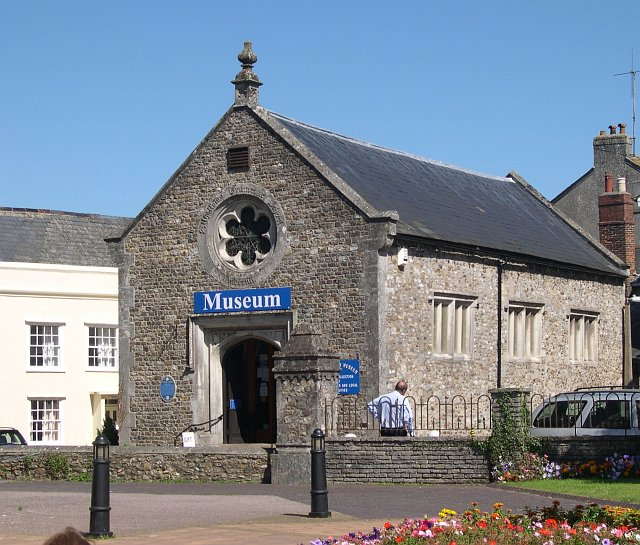
Honiton Town Museum

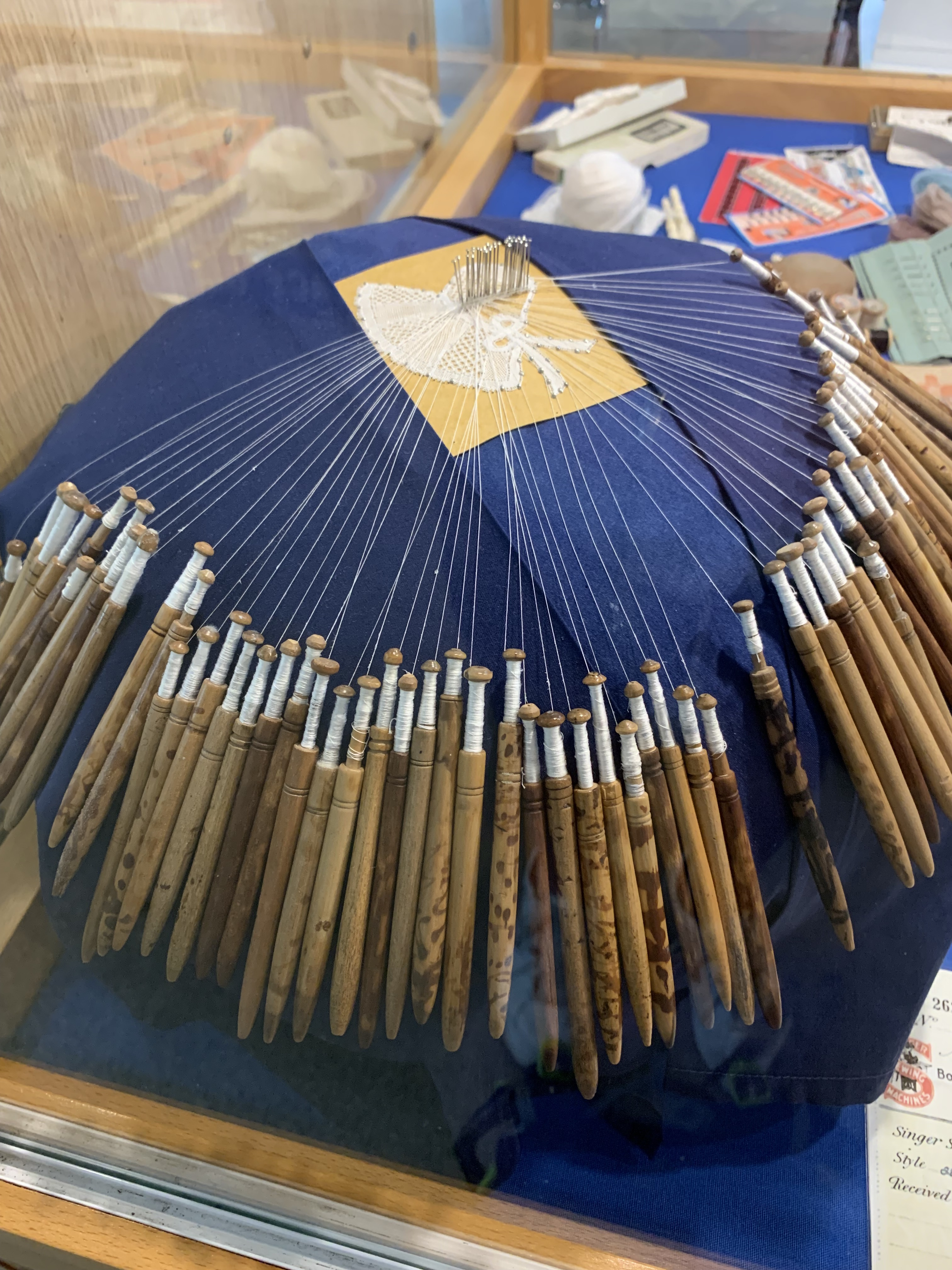
This shows lace bobbins on a lace making pillow on display at the Allhallows Museum in Honiton, England.

Allhallows Museum of Lace and Local Antiquities claims to hold one of the most comprehensive collections of Honiton lace in the world. It is located in a building, claimed to be the oldest still extant in Honiton, which formerly belonged to Allhallows School from the 16th century until the 1930s.

== Culture ==
=== Honiton Hot Pennies Ceremony ===
Honiton was granted a royal charter in 1221 during the reign of King Henry III that allowed it to hold a market. To celebrate, the town held the Honiton Fair, originally on Allhallows Eve and Allhallows Day (1 November), the date was changed in 1247 to the eve and feast of St Margaret (19/20 July). In order to encourage people to travel to the town from the surrounding area to attend a subsequent fair without fear of arrest for their debts, no arrests for outstanding debts were allowed while the fair took place. At the beginning landed gentry took pleasure in throwing hot chestnuts from windows to local peasants and over time these gave way to hot pennies, a seemingly philanthropic gesture resulting in burns (until the peasants figured out to wear gloves or use a cloth to pick the pennies up).

The Hot Pennies ceremony still takes place annually in the High Street of the town. At noon, the Town Crier, accompanied by the Mayor and other local dignitaries, raises a garlanded pole with gloved hand at the top, and proclaims that "The glove is up. No man may be arrested until the glove is taken down". Pennies are then thrown from a number of balconies in the High Street to crowds of local people. The pole is then kept on display for the following "fair week".

=== Agricultural Show ===
Honiton is host to the annual Honiton Agricultural Show, an event traditionally held on the first Thursday of August in fields near the town, dating back to 1890.

== Education ==
Honiton has two primary schools, Honiton Primary School and Littletown Primary School, as well as a secondary school, Honiton Community College, which included a sixth form up until 2025.

== Media ==
Local news and television programmes are provided by BBC South West and ITV West Country. Television signals are received from the Stockland Hill transmitting station and local relay transmitters.

Local radio stations are BBC Radio Devon on 103.4 FM, Radio Exe Devon on 107.3, Heart West on 103.0 FM, and East Devon Radio, a community based radio station which broadcast to the town on 94.6 FM.

The town is served by the local newspaper, Midweek Herald which is published on Wednesdays.

== Transport ==
=== Road ===
Honiton is at the junction of the A35, the A30, A373 and A375 roads. The A30 now bypasses the town to the north. Until the bypass's construction in 1966, the town was blighted by traffic congestion. Though, according to many residents, it still is. The town is 10½ miles from Junction 28 of the M5. Despite Honiton's relatively small size, as a primary route destination beyond the western end of the A303, Honiton is signed from as far as Amesbury, over 60 miles away.

=== Rail ===
Honiton railway station is on the West of England Main Line and is served by South Western Railway services to London Waterloo and Exeter St Davids.

=== Bus ===
Stagecoach provides regular bus links to Sidmouth, Ottery St Mary and onwards to Exeter, Stagecoach also operates limited service to Seaton, Devon and Taunton. Dartline operates the town service and limited services in the surrounding area.

=== Air ===
Honiton is around 13 miles from Exeter Airport.

The nearby Dunkeswell Aerodrome (sometimes called Honiton Aerodrome) has been known to provide chartered flights.

== Twin towns ==
Honiton is twinned with Mézidon-Canon in France, and Gronau (Leine) in Germany.

== Notable residents ==
- Admiral Samuel Graves (1713–1787), an Admiral of the Royal Navy.
- John Prideaux (1718–1759), a brigadier-general in the British Army.
- Ozias Humphry (1742–1810), an English painter who specialised in portrait painting and portrait miniatures.
- Samuel Eyles Pierce (1746–1829), an English preacher, theologian, and Calvinist divine.
- Captain George Blagdon Westcott (1753–1798), a Royal Navy officer who served in the American War of Independence and French Revolutionary Wars.
- Thomas Cochrane, 10th Earl of Dundonald (1775–1860), naval officer, politician, local MP, 1806-1807 and mercenary.
- William Salter (1804–1875), portrait painter, his best known work is The Waterloo Banquet in Apsley House
- Alexander Baillie-Cochrane, 1st Baron Lamington (1816–1890), politician and local MP, 1859-1868.
- Alfred Leyman (1856–1933), a Devon born watercolour artist whose works covered many aspects of Devonion rural life.
- Clive Morrison-Bell (1871–1956), soldier, politician and local MP, 1910-1931.
- Juanita Maxwell Phillips (1880–1966), a Chilean-born British politician and activist. She was the first woman to serve on Honiton Borough Council, and as mayor of Honiton.
- Sir Peter Emery (1926–2004), politician and local MP 1967-1997.
- Rose Dugdale (1941–2024), an English debutante who rebelled against her wealthy upbringing and became an IRA Member
- Graham Loud (born 1953), a professor emeritus of medieval history at the University of Leeds.
- Kirstie Tancock (died 2016), an organ donation campaigner, personal trainer and pole fitness instructor.

=== Sport ===
- Edward Williams (1888–1915), a British rower who was a rowing team eight bronze medallist at the 1908 Summer Olympics
- Malcolm Nokes (1897–1986), schoolteacher, soldier and bronze medallist at the hammer throw at the 1924 Summer Olympics
- Maurice Setters (1936–2020), a football player and manager, who played in 434 games, including 159 at Manchester United
- Jo Pavey (born 1973), a British retired long-distance runner.
- Ryan Ashford (born 1981), a footballer who played 283 games including 140 for Eastleigh
