= Arthur Chichester (MP for Honiton) =

English politician (1783–1869)

Arthur Chichester (30 November 1783 – 16 July 1869) was an English politician.

He was a Member (MP) of the Parliament of the United Kingdom for Honiton 8 January 1835.
