= Kirstie Tancock =

British organ donation campaigner (died 2016)

Kirstie Tancock (née Mills, died 1 December 2016) was a British organ donation campaigner, personal trainer and pole fitness instructor. She was known for the BBC3 documentary Love on the Transplant List and for organ donation campaigns in England.

== Biography ==
Tancock was born with the chronic genetic disorder cystic fibrosis. She worked as a personal trainer and fitness pole dancing, aerial hoop and aerial silks instructor. She lived in Honiton, Devon, England.

In 2011, Tancock featured in the BBC3 documentary Love on the Transplant List, which followed her experiences for four months after she was put on the organ donation waiting list, planning her wedding and being resuscitated three days before she wed. The documentary was also broadcast in the United States on TLC. Tancock's documentary lead to her becoming "the face" of organ donation campaigns in England, working as an ambassador for the transplant charity Live Life then Give Life, and being shortlisted for Cosmopolitan magazine's Women of the Year Awards 2011.

Three weeks after her wedding, Tancock had a double lung transplant. Her lung function had dropped to 16%. The initial donor lungs were found to be too big and her body started to shut down. Another set of lungs was found while she was on life support and she underwent a four and a half hour operation to save her life. After the transplant, Tancock continued campaigning to change the organ donation law, encouraged donor registration and raised money for the hospital where she received her transplant.

By 2013, Tancock's body rejected the organs that she had received in 2011 and she underwent a second double lung transplant. In 2016, Tancock's body rejected the organs from her second transplant, she suffered from pneumonia and a chest infection, then doctors declared her too ill to receive a third transplant operation. She died on 1 December 2016 at NHS Royal Devon and Exeter Hospital, Exeter, Devon, England, after going into chronic rejection, aged 27.

Following Tancock's death, her widower Stuart called for a new law in her memory that assumes everyone would donate their organs at the end of their life. Her parents met with politicians to continue their daughter's campaign to change the organ donation law. The Organ Donation (Deemed Consent) Act was passed into law 2019, amending the Human Tissue Act 2004 to change organ donation in England, Wales and Northern Ireland to an opt-out programme.
