= James Ruddell-Todd =

British politician

James Ruddell-Todd (c. 1783 – 4 December 1852) was a British politician. He was elected to serve as Member of Parliament (MP) for Honiton on 23 December 1832.

Ruddell-Todd was born in Seagoe parish, County Armagh, Ireland, to John Ruddell and Grace Bell Todd. He was a director of the South Australian Company.
