= James Stewart (Honiton MP) =

English politician

James Stewart (17 August 1805 – 26 September 1860) was an English politician.

He was a Member (MP) of Parliament for Honiton in 1837.
