= River Wallington =

River in Hampshire, England

Coordinates: 50.881°N 1.032°W

Map of the lower parts of the river as at late 19th century

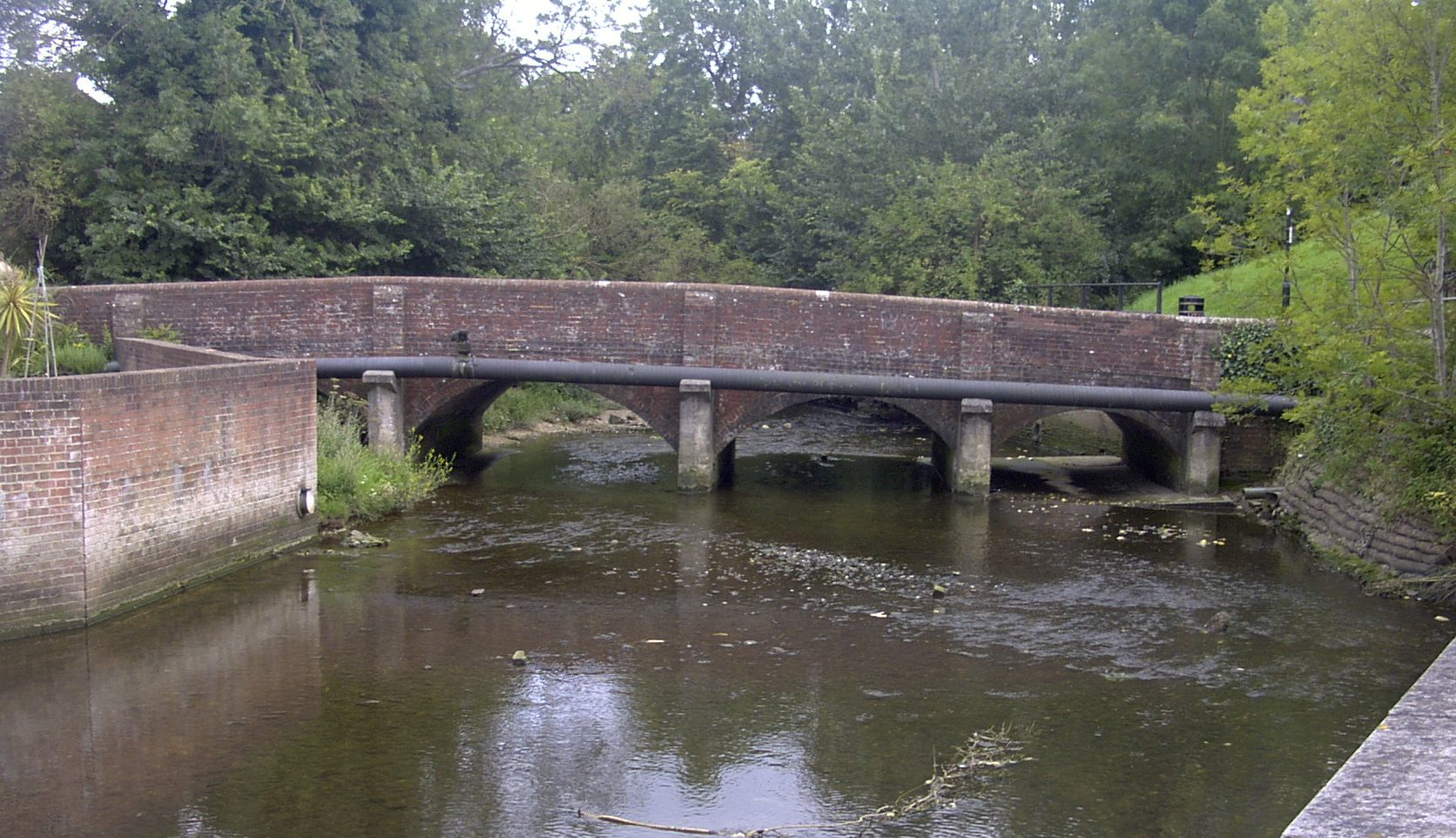
The River as it passes through Fareham, Hampshire

The River Wallington curves and gently meanders west then south in south-east Hampshire, England. Rising at sources to north and south of Waterlooville these flow west around Portsdown Hill into a dammed section as the lake in the grounds of Southwick House to unite, then through the village of Southwick then, in that parish, to receive the Beck of similar flow from the north. The river turns south and runs past fields and past the large town Fareham, before entering Portsmouth Harbour, as its main natural watercourse inflow, at Wallington.

The Beck drains, likewise standard small dendritic drainage sources, at least four in number, and particularly the hamlets of Upper and Lower Beckford in Southwick and Widley civil parish, crossed by Beckford Lane today at Beckford Bridge, a former ford.
