= Wallington, Hampshire =

Village in Hampshire, England

Coordinates: 50.85506°N 1.17028°W

Wallington
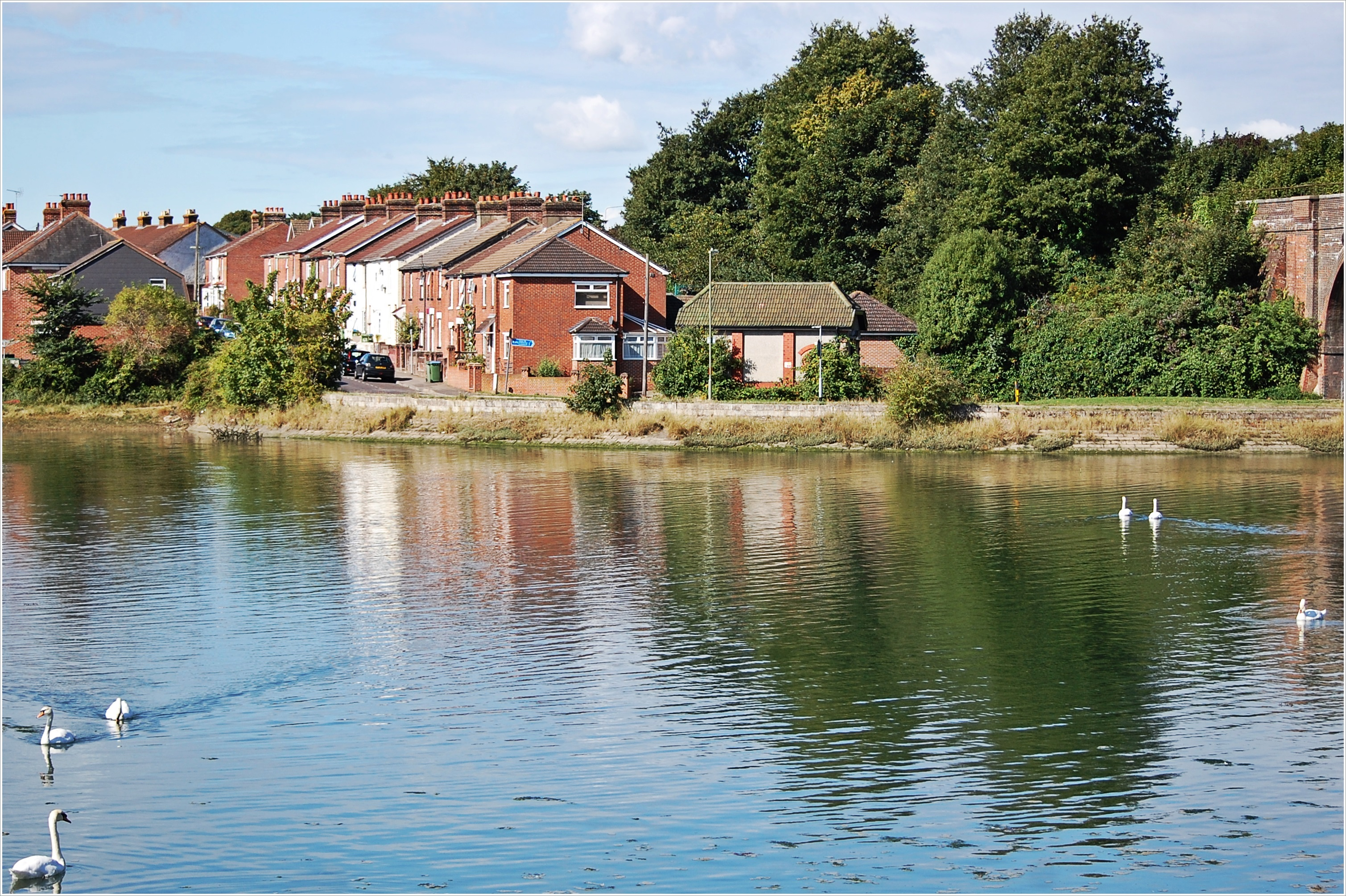

- Location within Hampshire
- OS grid reference: SU585065
- District: Fareham
- Shire county: Hampshire
- Region: South East
- Country: England
- Sovereign state: United Kingdom
- Dialling code: 01329
- Police: Hampshire and Isle of Wight
- Fire: Hampshire and Isle of Wight
- Ambulance: South Central
- UK Parliament: Fareham and Waterlooville

Wallington is a village in Hampshire, part of the borough of Fareham. It is situated between Portsmouth and Southampton near where the River Wallington enters Portsmouth Harbour.

The name Wallington probably means 'settlement of the Welsh' (or Britons) – Weala-tun / Walintone (Old English) and not 'walled town' as might be inferred.

== Industry ==
The village is now a residential suburb of Fareham, but was once a separate entity with a brewery and tannery as its main industries. Wallington was also important in brickmaking and pottery. The bricks known as "Fareham reds" were made locally – the most famous use of which is the Royal Albert Hall. Wallington also boasts the largest collection of Fareham pots – chimney pots.

== Fort Wallington ==
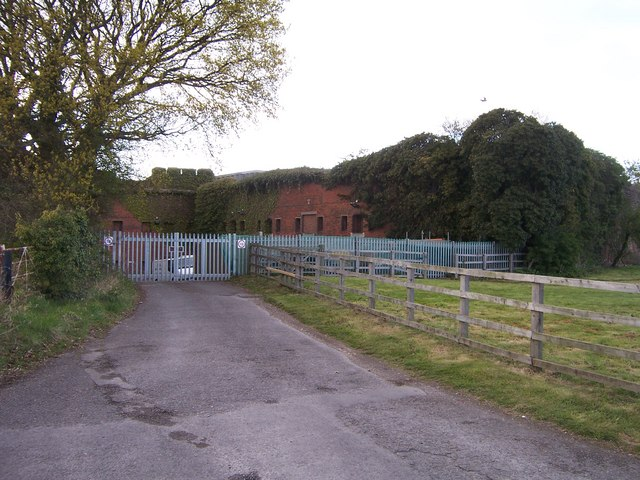
The remnants of Fort Wallington

In the 1860s the Royal Commission on the Defences of the United Kingdom recommended that a line of forts be built along Portsdown Hill. The western end of this line was Fort Wallington. Building of the fort was started in 1861 and completed in 1874. Following its sale to Mr J. Sullivan of the Southern Counties Trading Company the fort has been used as an industrial depot, and much of the old fort has been demolished – little now remains. What remains is now a Grade II Listed Building.

== Wallington Village Community Association ==
The WVCA is an organisation based in the Village Hall. It is involved in many areas of village life. It began in the late 1970s initially in response to the threat of demolition to the bridge over River Wallington as it was seen as the cause of flooding.

== 2012 River Wallington Flood ==
In December 2012, Wallington residents were ordered to evacuate by the Environment Agency due to potential heavy flooding from a breakdown in flood defences. Flooding led to six people having to be rescued by Hampshire Fire and Rescue Service from submerged vehicles, in addition to two people rescued by a Police Community Support Officer (PCSO) from their submerged car which had become stranded in a ford in Sway, Hampshire.

== Notable residents ==
Jerold Wells (1908–1999), actor
