= Harry Baines Lott =

English politician (1781–1833)

Harry Baines Lott (1781–1833), of Tracey House, Awliscombe, Devon, was an English politician.

He was a Member of Parliament (MP) for Honiton 1826–1830 and 1831–1832.
