= Bladen (surname) =

Bladen is a surname. Notable people with the surname include:

- William Bladen (mayor) (1585–1663), Anglo-Irish Bookseller/Printer and Mayor of Dublin
- Thomas Bladen (priest) (c. 1615–1695), Anglo-Irish Priest and Bookseller/Printer of Dublin
- Nathaniel Bladen (1642–1717), English lawyer - father of Colonel Martin and William Bladen
- William Bladen (1673–1718), English lawyer - Attorney-General of Maryland (son of Nathaniel above)
- Martin Bladen (1680–1746), Commissioner of the Board of Trade, Comptroller of the Mint (son of Nathaniel above)
- Thomas Bladen (1698–1780), Governor of Maryland (son of William above)
- Vincent Bladen (1900–1981), Canadian economist
- Ronald Bladen (1918–1988), American painter and sculptor
- Peter Bladen (1922–2001), Australian poet
