= Robert Fairfax (Royal Navy officer) =

English rear admiral and politician

Rear-Admiral Robert Fairfax
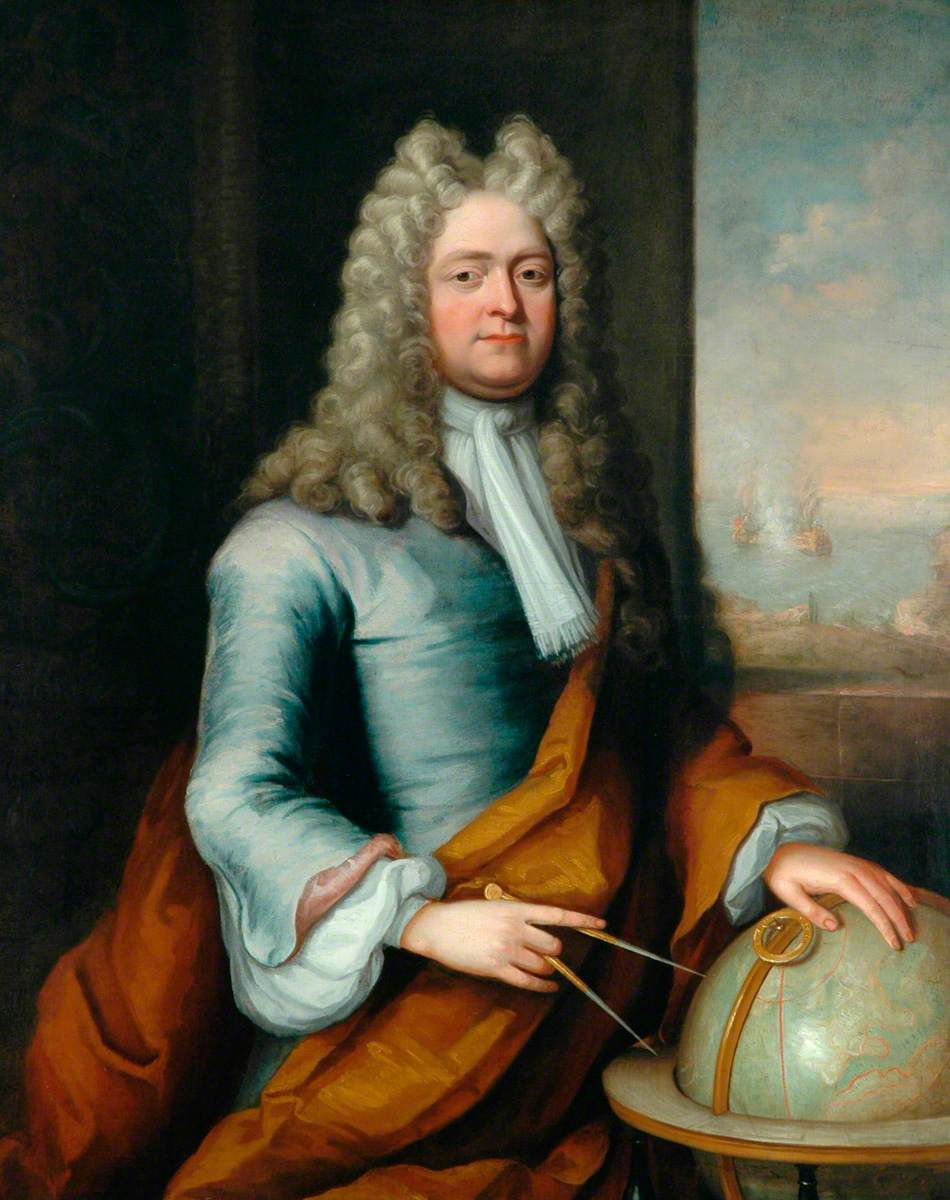
- Portrait of Fairfax c.1720
- Born: February 1666; Newton Kyme, Yorkshire
- Died: 17 October 1725 (aged 59)
- Military career
- Allegiance: Kingdom of England; Kingdom of Great Britain
- Branch: Royal Navy (1687–1707); Royal Navy (1707–1708)
- Service years: 1687–1708
- Rank: Rear-Admiral
- Commands: Conception Prize; Pembroke; Ruby; Newark; Cornwall; Severn; Cambridge; Restoration; Somerset; Kent; Berwick; Torbay; Barfleur; Albemarle
- Conflicts: Nine Years' War: Battle of Bantry Bay; Battle of Beachy Head; War of the Spanish Succession: Capture of Gibraltar; Battle of Málaga; Siege of Barcelona

Rear-Admiral Robert Fairfax (February 1666 – 17 October 1725) was a Royal Navy officer and politician.

== Origins and early life ==
Robert Fairfax was born in Newton Kyme, and baptised in the chapel in Steeton, North Yorkshire on 23 February 1666. He was the second son of William Fairfax (1630–1673) and Catherine Stapleton (d. 1695), and grandson of Sir William Fairfax.

== Ships ==
He first went to sea in 1681, in a merchant ship, the Mary, commanded by Captain Bushell, the son of an old parliamentary officer. With Bushell he made two voyages to the Mediterranean. On his return in December 1685 his friends were desirous that he should enter the Royal Navy, but it was not till January 1687–8 that he was received as a volunteer on board the Mary, the flagship of Sir Roger Strickland.

=== Bonaventure ===
Within a few weeks after the accession of William III and Mary II, Fairfax was promoted to be lieutenant of the Bonaventure, commanded by Captain (afterwards Sir) Thomas Hopsonn. In her he was present at the Battle of Bantry Bay, 1 May 1689, and afterwards at the relief of Derry, 28 July.

In June 1690 Hopsonn was relieved in the command of the Bonaventure by Captain Hubbard, but Fairfax, remaining in her, was present at the Battle of Beachy Head on 30 June 1690. On 15 November he was promoted to the command of the Conception Prize, and for the next two years was stationed at Boston in New England, cruising against the French privateers.

=== Pembroke, Ruby, Newark, Cornwall ===
In June 1693 Fairfax was moved into the Pembroke of 60 guns, and, returning in her to England, was appointed to the command of the Ruby, a 48-gun ship, ordered to cruise on the coast of Ireland for the protection of trade. While on this service he had the good fortune to capture, after a hard-fought action, the Entreprenant, a French privateer of the same nominal force, but larger, and with a more numerous complement. In recognition of this service he was promoted, 24 December 1694, to the command of the Newark of 80 guns, in which, and afterwards in the Cornwall, he was employed in convoy service, in the English Channel, in the Bay of Biscay, or on the coast of Portugal, till the Peace of Ryswick.

=== Severn, Cambridge, Restoration ===
In May 1699 Fairfax commissioned the Severn, which in the following year was one of the fleet sent under Sir George Rooke to maintain the Treaty of Altona between Denmark and Holstein. On returning from the Baltic he was appointed to the Cambridge, and in January 1701 – 1702, on the eve of the declaration of war, was transferred to the 70-gun ship HMS Restoration, one of the squadron which sailed under Sir John Munden in May. After failing to intercept the French squadron off Corunna, Munden and his ships returned to Spithead, and in the following autumn Fairfax was sent out to reinforce the grand fleet, which he joined at Vigo on 18 October, too late to share in the glory or the treasure, but in time to take part in the labour of refitting the prizes and bringing them to England.

=== Somerset, Kent ===
HMS Restoration was then put out of commission, and in January 1702–3 Fairfax was appointed to the Somerset, from which in May he was transferred to the Kent as flag-captain to Rear-admiral Thomas Dilkes, with whom he served during the summer, and especially in the wholesale capture or destruction of the French merchant ships at Granville on 26 July, a service for which Fairfax and the other captains engaged, as well as the rear-admiral, received a gold medal.

=== Berwick ===
With the new year Fairfax commissioned the Berwick, a 70-gun ship, in which he sailed in March to join Sir George Rooke and the grand fleet at Lisbon. With this the Berwick continued during the summer and was one of the six ships which vainly chased a French squadron off Cape Palos on 8 May - a failure for which Fairfax and the other captains were tried by court-martial, but fully acquitted. He was one of the division actually engaged under Byng at the reduction of Gibraltar (23 July), for his share in which exploit ‘the Queen afterwards presented Fairfax with a silver cup and cover bearing a suitable inscription, which is still preserved by his descendants’. The Berwick took an honourable part in the Battle of Málaga (13 Aug.), where her masts, rigging, and sails were shattered and torn, and she had sixty-nine men killed and wounded. The fleet afterwards returned to England for the winter, and in the following February the Berwick was paid off at Chatham.

=== Torbay ===
Fairfax was immediately appointed to the Torbay. In her he again went to the Mediterranean, under the command of Sir Cloudesley Shovell, and participated with the fleet in the reduction of Barcelona. After the capture of Montjuich the prisoners were sent on board the Torbay. The Torbay supplied guns to arm the fort and sailors to haul them up the hill. Her marines were landed for service in the trenches and Fairfax himself had command of the seven bomb vessels, whose terrible fire cowed the garrison and rendered the approaches of the besiegers easier and safer. When the town capitulated on 4 Oct. the season was already far advanced and, according to the custom of the day, the fleet at once returned to England.

=== Barfleur, Albemarle ===
In March 1706 Fairfax was appointed to the Barfleur, and as commander-in-chief in the Thames and Medway. In May he was ordered round to Spithead to join Shovell, who was then preparing to carry over an expeditionary force intended to effect a descent on the coast of France. After vainly waiting for a promised Dutch squadron till the summer was passed, the fleet was forced, by a westerly gale, to take shelter in Torbay. It was detained for several weeks, and the original idea of a landing in France had to be given up. The Berwick, by stress of weather, sprang a leak, and was found to be unseaworthy. She returned with difficulty to Portsmouth, where Lord Rivers, the general in command of the troops, and his staff, were transhipped to the Tartar frigate. In December Fairfax, with his ship's company, was turned over to the Albemarle, and during the early part of 1707 was commander-in-chief at Portsmouth. In August he was superseded, Sir John Leake having chosen the Albemarle as his flagship.

== Political difficulties ==
Consequent on the death of Sir Clowdisley Shovell (22 Oct. 1707), a promotion of flag-officers was made on 8 January 1708. Fairfax, by his seniority, was properly included, and a commission as Vice Admiral of the Blue was made out for him. This was signed by the Lord High Admiral, and was gazetted. It was then cancelled, and Lord Dursley, who was much his junior, was, by the political interest of his family, made Vice Admiral of the Blue in his stead, with seniority of 10 January. Fairfax, naturally indignant at this unworthy treatment, refused all further service. Prince George obtained for him a commission as rear-admiral, and half-pay equal to that of the rank which he had been deprived of and on 20 June 1708 had him nominated a member of the Council of the Lord High Admiral. With the Prince's death, 28 October 1708, this appointment came to an end, and Fairfax retired altogether from naval life.

== Political career ==
At a by-election in 1713 he was returned to Parliament for the city of York, but lost his seat in the general election after the accession of George I. He had meantime been elected an Alderman of York, of which city he was further elected Lord Mayor in 1715. He spent the remainder of his life in these, and other local duties, and in the management and development of his handsome property, Newton Kyme Hall.

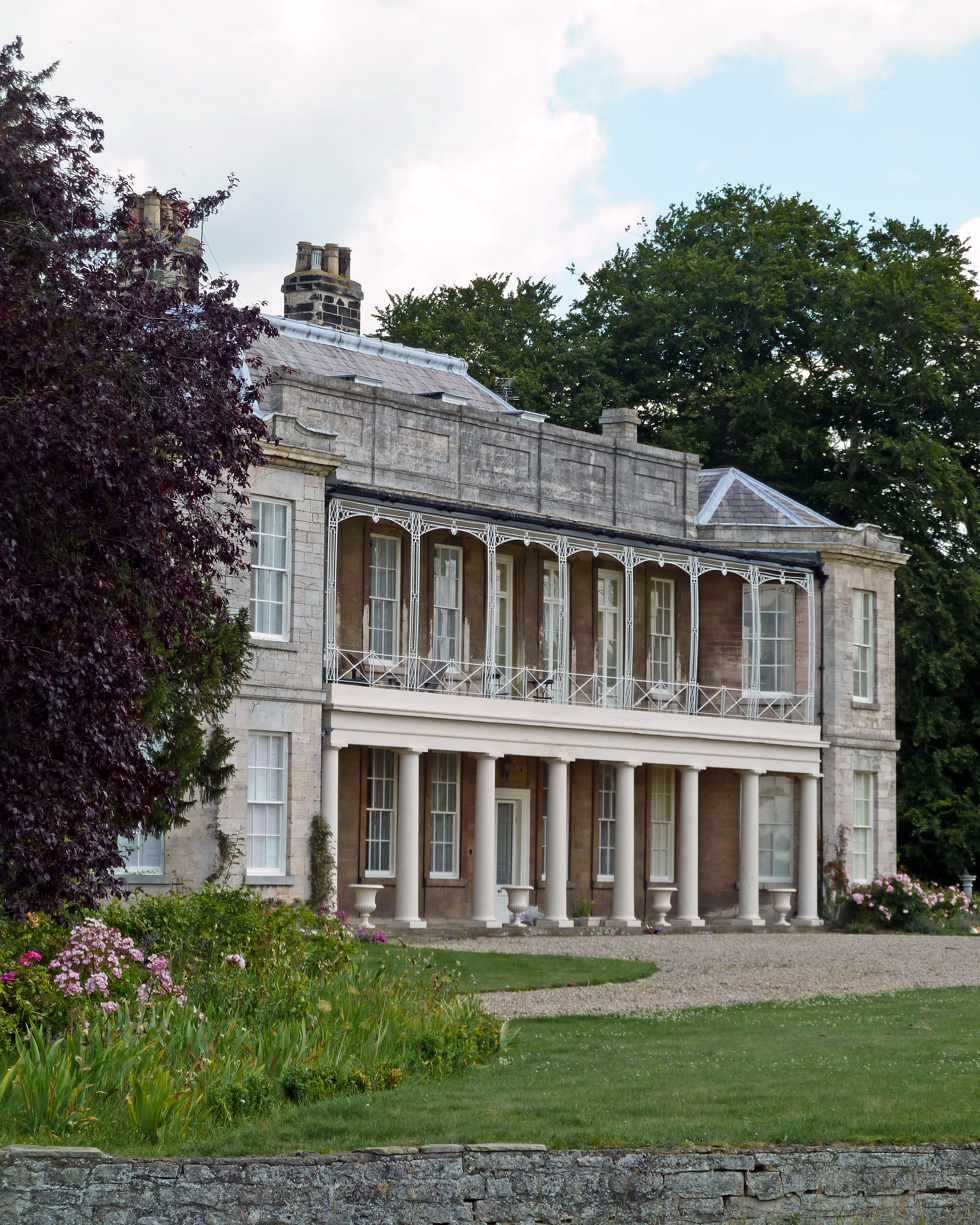
Newton Kyme Hall

== Personal life ==
By the death of his elder brother, on 20 January 1694, he succeeded to the Steeton and Newton Kyme estates. On 20 November of the same year he married Esther, the sister of his old captain, Bushell, and widow of Mr. Charles Tomlinson of Whitby. Although she was ten years older than him, he had had a boyish attachment to her from the time of his first going to sea.

== Death ==
He died on 17 October 1725. He was buried in the St Andrew's Church, Newton Kyme, where, sixty years before, he had been christened. His wife, though ten years older, survived him by ten years, and died at the age of eighty in 1735.

== Descendants ==
He left two children, a daughter, who married Mr. Henry Pawson, the son of an alderman of York, and a son, Thomas, whose posterity still hold the estates of Steeton, Newton Kyme, and Bilbrough, which last Fairfax acquired by purchase from the collateral family of Lord Fairfax. There are three portraits of the admiral, taken at the ages of thirty, forty-two, and shortly before his death. They are all in the possession of his family at Bilbrough. In a register ticket, dated 1696, he is described as a tall and well-set man of a fair complexion, which corresponds with the earlier portrait of the same date.

Parliament of Great Britain
Preceded by Sir William Robinson, Bt; Robert Benson	Member of Parliament for York; 1713–1715; With: Sir William Robinson, Bt	Succeeded by Sir William Robinson, Bt; Tobias Jenkins
