= Bladen =

Bladen may refer to:

== Places ==
=== United States ===
- Bladen, Georgia
- Bladen County, North Carolina
- Bladen, Nebraska

=== Other countries ===
- Bladen, Belize, a village in Toledo District, Belize
- Bladen, Poland

== Other ==
- Bladen (surname)
