= William Bladen =

English barrister (1672–1718)

Member of the Maryland House of Delegates from Annapolis
- In office 27 September 1708 – 2 October 1708 (Note: William Bladen and Wornell Hunt were elected in the election for Annapolis. Their election was declared void and they were unseated after the town's charter issued by John Seymour was ruled invalid by the Lower House of the General Assembly.) Serving with Wornell Hunt
- Succeeded by: Thomas Bordley

Attorney-General of the Province of Maryland
- In office January 1704 – 9 August 1718
- Preceded by: William Dent
- Succeeded by: Thomas Bordley

Secretary of the Province of Maryland
- In office April 1701 – November 1701
- Preceded by: Thomas Lawrence Jr.
- Succeeded by: Sir Thomas Lawrence Sr.

Personal details
- Born: c. 1673 Steeton, England
- Died: 9 August 1718 (aged 44) Annapolis, Province of Maryland
- Spouse: Anne van Swearingen (m. 1695)
- Parents: Nathaniel Bladen (father); Isabella Fairfax (mother)

William Bladen (c. 1673 – 9 August 1718) was an English politician, barrister, and clerk. He was the Attorney-General of the Province of Maryland for over a decade, in what is now the United States, and was briefly the secretary of the province. Bladen was also elected to the Maryland House of Delegates in 1708. He was the father of Thomas Bladen, the 19th Proprietary Governor of Maryland and was the brother of Colonel Martin Bladen, Commissioner of the Board of Trade and Plantations. He was named as one of the six original aldermen of Annapolis under the first city charter by governor John Seymour.

== Family ==
William Bladen was baptized on 21 March 1673 at Steeton in Yorkshire. He was the eldest son of Nathaniel Bladen and Isabella Fairfax, daughter of Sir William Fairfax of Steeton. His father was an attorney who worked as a steward to Thomas Osborne, the Earl of Danby, then later he was steward to the Countess of Plymouth and the Duchess of Buckingham.

== Political appointments ==
Bladen was admitted to the Inner Temple in 1687. Bladen departed England for the Province of Maryland in the spring of 1692. He arrived in Maryland with the new Governor Lionel Copley who was well known to the Bladen family. Copley was a protégé of the Earl of Danby's, having been his lieutenant governor in Hull and had enjoyed the Earl of Danby's protection and patronage for many years. Copley took Bladen along to assist with his legal and business matters but the new governor died within a year. Bladen, however, had already begun to secure appointments in the colony:-

- 1692 – Admitted to the Provincial, Cecil County and Prince George County courts
- 1693 – Appointed to a Committee to inspect provincial records
- 1695 – Clerk of the Lower House (3 years)
- 1695 – Clerk of St Mary's County (3 years)
- 1696 – Clerk of Indictments – Prince George County (2 years)
- 1697 – Deputy Collector of Annapolis (for 5 months only)
- 1697 – Surveyor and Searcher of Annapolis (21 years)
- 1697 – Clerk of the Upper House (19 years)
- 1698 – Clerk of the High Court of Appeals (9 years)
- 1698 – Clerk of the council (18 years)
- 1698 – Register of Vice-Admiralty Court of Eastern Shore (>5 years)
- 1698 – Register of Vice-Admiralty Court of Western Shore (>5 years)
- 1698 – Clerk of Free Schools of Annapolis (15 years)
- 1698 – Naval Officer of Annapolis (19 years)
- 1699 – Clerk of the Prerogative Office (10 months only)
- 1701 – Secretary of the Province of Maryland (from 16 April to 19 November)
- 1703 – Deputy-Surveyor General of Customs (12 years)
- 1703 – Appointed to the Court of Anne Arundel County
- 1704 – Attorney-General of the Province of Maryland (14 years)
- 1708 – Alderman of Annapolis (one of the six original Aldermen) (10 years)
- 1708 – Commissary General or Judge of Probate (10 years).

A shortage of Clerks in Maryland led to William holding down numerous appointments, often simultaneously. In April 1701, following the death of the previous incumbent Thomas Lawrence Jr., William petitioned the Council of Trade and Plantations in June to be considered as Secretary to the Colony and had the support of Governor Nathaniel Blakiston and also his father Nathaniel Bladen who lobbied in his support to the Board of Trade in London. He held the post for just a few months but then he was required to step aside when it became known that Sir Thomas Lawrence Senior desired the post. William took up his appointment as Attorney-General to Maryland in January 1704 and held the post until his death. Bladen died 7 August 1718.

== Marriage and children ==
William married Anne van Swearingen at St. Inigoes, St Mary's County in Maryland in 1695. Anne was the daughter of Dutch immigrant Gerrit (Garrett) van Swearingen and Mary Smith. They had several children including:

- Anne Bladen (1696–1775), who married Benjamin Tasker Sr. (1690–1768; later Governor of Maryland),
- Thomas Bladen (1698–1780), who married Barbara Janssen (sister to Mary, Lady Baltimore, wife of Charles Calvert, the Proprietary Governor of the Province of Maryland, both being daughters of Sir Theodore Janssen – a French immigrant),
- Others: Christopher, Priscilla, Martin and William.

Descendants of daughter Anne Tasker (Bladen) would marry into the Carter, Ogle, Dulaney and Lowndes families, many of whom would hold high political office in Maryland

Descendants of son Thomas Bladen (via daughter Harriet) would marry into the Capel family – Earls of Essex.

== Notes ==
Preceded by William Dent	Attorney–General of the Province of Maryland; 1704–1718	Succeeded by Thomas Bordley
Preceded by Thomas Lawrence Jr.	Secretary of the Province of Maryland; April 1701 – November 1701	Succeeded by Sir Thomas Lawrence Sr.
