= Listed buildings in Steeton, North Yorkshire =

Steeton, North Yorkshire is a civil parish in the county of North Yorkshire, England. It contains four listed buildings that are recorded in the National Heritage List for England. Of these, one is listed at Grade II*, the middle of the three grades, and the others are at Grade II, the lowest grade. The parish does not contain any significant settlements, and the listed buildings consist of a farmhouse, an associated archway and wall, and two mileposts.

== Key ==
Grade	Criteria
II*	Particularly important buildings of more than special interest
II	Buildings of national importance and special interest

== Buildings ==
Name and location	Photograph	Date	Notes	Grade
Archway and wall, Steeton Hall Farm; 53.89127°N 1.19051°W	—	12th century (probable)	The archway is set in the remains of a wall dating from the 15th centuryn and are in magnesian limestone with some brick on the archway. The wall has a chamfered plinth and is about 1 metre (3 ft 3 in) in height and 20 metres (66 ft) in length. The archway is slightly pointed, and has remains of one narrow shaft which continues as moulding around the head. It is flanked by pyramidal finials that rise to a pediment with stone coping and a cross at the apex.	II
Steeton Hall Farm; 53.89156°N 1.19038°W		c. 1474	The farmhouse is in magnesian limestone on a partial chamfered plinth, with an angle buttress, and a swept roof of pantile and stone slate. There are two storeys, seven bays, and a brick outshut. The doorway has a Tudor arch, moulded jambs, and a moulded hood. Some windows are sashes, but most are mullioned and transomed with chamfered and moulded surrounds, those in the ground floor with moulded flat hoods.	II*
Milepost (north); 53.90254°N 1.19704°W	—	Early 19th century (probable)	The milepost on the southeast side of the A64 road is a stone post with a cast iron plate. It has a triangular plan and a round-arched top, and is about 0.75 metres (2 ft 6 in) in height. On the top is inscribed "TADCASTER & HOBMOOR ROAD" and "STEETON", the east face has the distances to Leeds and Tadcaster, and on the west face is the distance to York.	II
Milepost (south); 53.89317°N 1.21565°W	—	Early 19th century (probable)	The milepost on the southeast side of the A64 road is a stone post with a cast iron plate. It has a triangular plan and a round-arched top, and is about 0.75 metres (2 ft 6 in) in height. On the top is inscribed "TADCASTER & HOBMOOR ROAD" and "STEETON", the east face has the distances to Leeds and Tadcaster, and on the west face is the distance to York.	II
