= Listed buildings in Newton Kyme cum Toulston =

Newton Kyme cum Toulston is a civil parish in the county of North Yorkshire, England. It contains 18 listed buildings that are recorded in the National Heritage List for England. Of these, one is listed at Grade I, the highest of the three grades, one is at Grade II*, the middle grade, and the others are at Grade II, the lowest grade. It contains the village of Newton Kyme and the surrounding area. The most important buildings in the parish are a church, which is listed together with items in the churchyard, and a country house, which is listed together with associated structures. The other listed buildings include houses, a boundary stone, a milestone, and a disused railway viaduct.

== Key ==
Grade	Criteria
I	Buildings of exceptional interest, sometimes considered to be internationally important
II*	Particularly important buildings of more than special interest
II	Buildings of national importance and special interest

== Buildings ==
Name and location	Photograph	Date	Notes	Grade
St Andrew's Church; 53.89801°N 1.29259°W		12th century	The church has been altered and extended through the centuries. It is built in magnesian limestone with a stone slate roof, and consists of a nave, a north aisle, a south porch, a chancel with a north chapel, and a west tower. The tower has two stages, a plinth, a two-light trefoil-headed west window, a floor band, a slit window on the south, and two-light bell openings, above which is a band with gargoyles, and an embattled parapet.	I
Ruins of Newton Kyme Castle; 53.89851°N 1.29211°W		13th century (probable)	The remains of the manor house are in magnesian limestone. They consist of a thick wall about 10 metres (33 ft) long and 3 metres (9.8 ft) high. The wall contains a pointed archway and a lancet window.	II
Cross base 53.89790°N 1.29281°W		Medieval	The cross base is in the churchyard of St Andrew's Church to the southwest of the church. It is in magnesian limestone, with a square plan, and is about 0.75 metres (2 ft 6 in) high.	II
Graveslab east of the porch 53.89795°N 1.29282°W		Medieval	The graveslab in the churchyard of St Andrew's Church is in magnesian limestone. It has a trapezoid plan, it is about 1.25 metres (4 ft 1 in) long, and has badly-weathered decoration.	II
Graveslab southwest of the porch 53.89790°N 1.29262°W		Medieval	The graveslab in the churchyard of St Andrew's Church is in magnesian limestone. It has a trapezoid plan, it is about 1.25 metres (4 ft 1 in) long, and has badly-weathered decoration.	II
The Dower House; 53.89819°N 1.29478°W		17th century (probable)	The main part of the house dates from about 1710, and was added to the gable end of an earlier house. It is in magnesian limestone, with quoins, and a Welsh slate roof, with stone coping and kneelers to the early part, and the later part has a hipped roof. The later part has two storeys and an attic, and five bays, and the gabled end has two storeys and one bay. On the front is a doorway and sash windows, all with stone surrounds, and in the roof are dormers with horizontally-sliding sashes. At the rear is a doorway with pilasters, an oblong fanlight, and a broken pediment on acanthus consoles.	II
Boundary stone 53.89218°N 1.28862°W	—	1725	The boundary stone on the southwest side of the A659 road is in magnesian limestone. It has an oblong plan, it is about 1 metre (3 ft 3 in) high, and on the face is an inscription and the date.	II
Newton Kyme Hall; 53.89825°N 1.29325°W		Early 18th century	A country house in magnesian limestone and sandstone, with a hipped Welsh slate roof. The main range has two storeys and attics and seven bays, with flanking canted bays, and rear wings. In the ground floor is a Tuscan colonnade, and above is a cast iron verandah, above which is a cornice and a parapet. The end bays have moulded bands. The windows are sashes with aprons, and in the attic are three dormers.	II*
Wall, gate and railings to fold yard, The Dower House; 53.89857°N 1.29552°W	—	Early 18th century	The wall is in magnesian limestone, and is about 0.5 metres (1 ft 8 in) high and 6 metres (20 ft) long. The railings, some with urn finials, and the gates, are in cast iron.	II
Ha-ha south of Newton Kyme Hall; 53.89782°N 1.29350°W		18th century	The ha-ha is in magnesian limestone. It has a semicircular plan, and is about 1 metre (3 ft 3 in) high.	II
The Rectory; 53.89830°N 1.29435°W		1768	The house is in magnesian limestone on a plinth, with a sill band, a low parapet with a central balustrade and four ball finials, and a Welsh slate roof. There are two storeys and five bays. The windows are sashes. The central doorway has been converted into a window, and it has a moulded architrave and a hood on consoles.	II
Wall and railings, The Rectory; 53.89816°N 1.29433°W		1768	Enclosing the garden at the front of the house is a low wall in magnesian limestone, about 2.5 metres (8 ft 2 in) high and 6 metres (20 ft) long, with ball finials. The railings are in cast iron and are about 1 metre (3 ft 3 in) high.	II
The Old Schoolhouse; 53.89807°N 1.29549°W		1787	A master's house, schoolroom and barn converted into a house, it is in magnesian limestone, with a Welsh slate roof and stone coped gables. The house has two storeys and three bays, and the former schoolroom to the left has a single storey and two bays. In the centre of the house is a doorway with a moulded shouldered architrave and a hood. The windows in the house are sashes, in the schoolroom they are casements, and all have hoods on consoles. On the schoolroom is a weathered marble plaque.	II
Coach house and stables 53.89878°N 1.29325°W		Early 19th century	The building is in magnesian limestone with a Welsh slate roof. There is a U-shaped plan, with a central range of two storeys and two bays, flanked by single-storey single-bay wings, and projecting at right angles are single-storey two-bay wings with hipped roofs. In the centre is a portico with two square piers and carriage arches. Elsewhere, there is a stable entrance and sash windows.	II
Groom's House; 53.89873°N 1.29353°W	—	Early 19th century	The house is in magnesian limestone on a plinth, with a Welsh slate roof. There is one storey and four bays. On the front are sash windows, one in a blocked doorway, and the entrance is in the right side.	II
Wharfe Bridge; 53.90305°N 1.32177°W		1847	The railway viaduct over the River Wharfe, now disused, was built by the York and North Midland Railway company. It is in magnesian limestone with gritstone dressings. It consists of five round arches on each side of the river, and over the river are two steel plate girders on a mid-stream pier. The arches have piers with cutwaters, and voussoirs under a band.	II
Milestone; 53.89378°N 1.29520°W		19th century	The milestone on the south side of the A659 road is in stone with a cast iron front. It has a triangular plan and a semicircular top, and is about 1 metre (3 ft 3 in) high. On the top is inscribed "TADCASTER & OTLEY ROAD" and "NEWTON KYME", on the west face are the distances to Boston, Wetherby, Harewood and Otley, and on the east face the distance to Tadcaster.	II
Icehouse northeast of Newton Kyme Hall; 53.89865°N 1.29249°W	—	19th century	The icehouse and well are in magnesian limestone and incorporate earlier material. There is a wall about 6 metres (20 ft) long and 1.75 metres (5 ft 9 in) high. The entrance is in the centre and has a lintel inscribed with a motto, and there is an earth roof.	II
