= Steeton Hall Farm =

Farmhouse in Steeton, North Yorkshire, England

Coordinates: 53.8916°N 1.1904°W

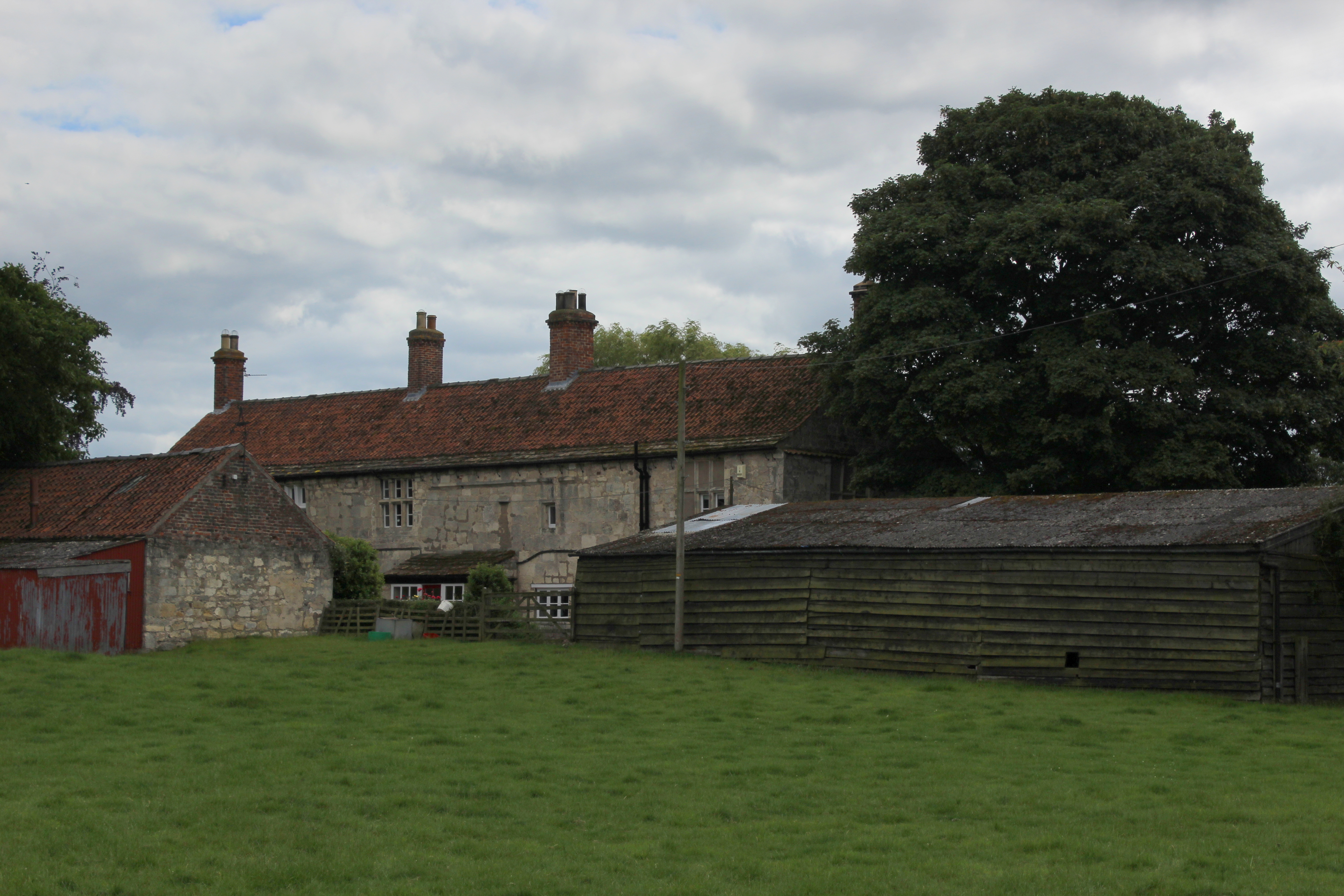
The house, in 2019

Steeton Hall Farm is a historic building in the civil parish of Steeton, North Yorkshire, south-west of York in England.

Steeton Hall was in existence by the 12th century, when a chapel was built. In about 1474, Guy Fairfax replaced the old hall with a large manor house, with a moat. In the 1558, his descendent, William Fairfax, made an inventory of the property, which had nine bedrooms, two studies, a hall and a parlour. In the early 18th century, the building was reduced in size, with the demolition of its wings, and the building later became a farmhouse. The chapel was converted into a granary, and demolished in 1873. The house was Grade II* listed in 1985.

The building is constructed of Magnesian Limestone, with a slate and pantile roof, and brick chimneys. There is also a brick extension, dating from the 20th century. The house is two storeys high, and has seven first floor windows, with the entrance door under the sixth window. The doorway has a Tudor arch, and the door is panelled. Most of the windows have mullion and transoms, and inside some boxed timber beams are visible.

Outside the house, there is a 20-metre wall, built in the 15th century of Magnesian Limestone, which originally formed part of a range of buildings. It incorporates a 12th-century archway, which was the entrance to the chapel. This structure is Grade II listed. Part of the moat also survives, as a ditch.

== See also ==
- Grade II* listed buildings in North Yorkshire (district)
- Listed buildings in Steeton, North Yorkshire
