= William Fairfax (soldier) =

English Civil War soldier

Sir William Fairfax
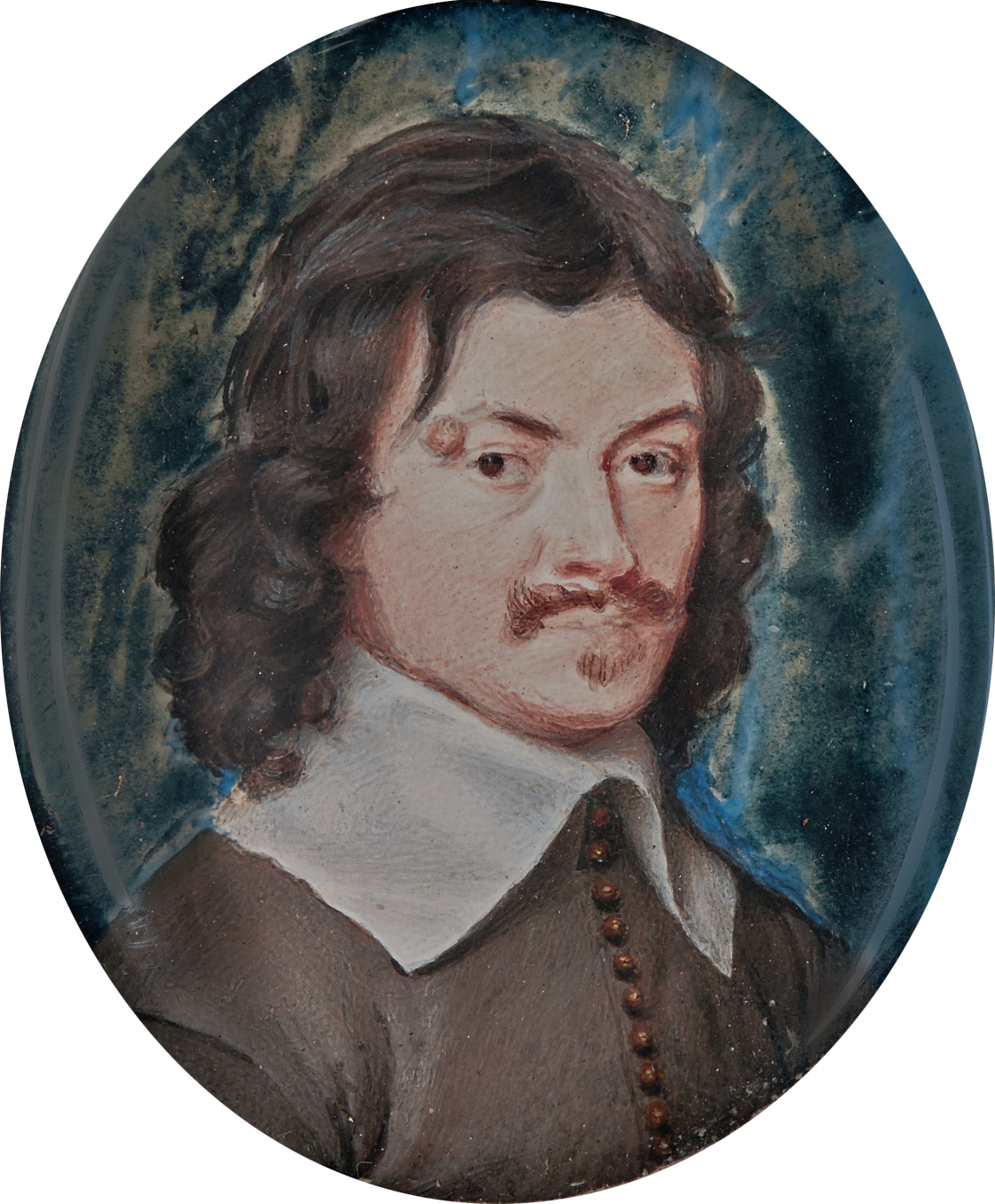
- Died: September 19, 1644; Montgomery Castle, Wales
- Cause of death: Wounds from combat
- Parents: Sir Philip Fairfax; Frances Sheffield
- Relatives: Edmund Sheffield, 1st Earl of Mulgrave (grandfather)

Sir William Fairfax (1609 – 19 September 1644), was an officer in the Parliamentary army during the English Civil War.

== Biography ==
Fairfax was the second son of Sir Philip Fairfax of Steeton and Frances Sheffield, daughter of Edmund Sheffield, 3rd Baron Sheffield.

Fairfax was knighted by Charles I at Whitehall on 1 June 1630. In 1636, he succeeded to the family estates at Steeton and Newton Kyme. In 1642, he took the side of the parliament, and signed the Yorkshire petition of 12 May 1642, beseeching the king to trust to parliament and dismiss his guards. He was given the command of a regiment in the army of Essex, which was stationed on the left wing at the Battle of Edgehill and ran away. Fairfax then joined his uncle, Ferdinando, Lord Fairfax, in Yorkshire, and took part in the capture of Leeds (23 January 1643) and Wakefield (21 May 1643).

In a letter to his wife, he says of himself and his cousin, Sir Thomas Fairfax: "For Thomas's part and mine we rest neither night nor day nor will willingly till we have done God some good service against His and our enemies". In the victory at Nantwich (25 January 1644) Sir William Fairfax commanded a wing of the horse, and at Marston Moor headed a brigade of foot on the right of the parliamentary line. In August 1644 he was despatched into Lancashire with two thousand Yorkshire horse, and took part in the siege of Liverpool. In the Relief of Montgomery Castle on 18 September 1644, he was mortally wounded, and died the following day. John Vicars, who gives a detailed account of the death of Fairfax, states that he had fifteen wounds, and adds that his widow said "that she grieved not that he died in this cause, but that he died so soon to do no more for it".

== Family ==
In 1629 William Fairfax married Frances, daughter of Sir Thomas Chaloner of Guisborough in Cleveland, and sister of James and Thomas Chaloner, the regicides. Parliament voted £1,500 for the widow and children, and on 7 September 1655 the council of state voted them £2,000 more in lieu of arrears of pay due to their father. He was the father of General Thomas Fairfax 1633–1712, William 1630-73 (whose son was Robert Fairfax), Catherine b1634 and Isabella Fairfax (1635-1691) who married Nathaniel Bladen.
