= Martin Bladen =

British politician

Member of the Great Britain Parliament for Stockbridge
- In office 1715–1734 Serving with: Thomas Brodrick 1715–1722; John Chetwynd 1722–1734
- Preceded by: Thomas Brodrick; The Earl of Barrymore
- Succeeded by: Sir Humphrey Monoux; John Montagu

Member of the Great Britain Parliament for Maldon
- In office 1734–1741 Serving with: Henry Parsons 1734–1740; Benjamin Keene 1740–1741
- Preceded by: Henry Parsons; Thomas Bramston
- Succeeded by: Sir Thomas Drury, Bt; Robert Colebrooke

Member of the Great Britain Parliament for Portsmouth
- In office 1741–1746 Serving with: Philip Cavendish 1741–1743; Sir Charles Hardy 1743–1744; Isaac Townsend 1744–1746
- Preceded by: Edward Vernon; Philip Cavendish
- Succeeded by: Thomas Gore; Isaac Townsend

Personal details
- Born: 1680 Yorkshire, England
- Died: 15 February 1746 (aged 65–66) Aldborough Hatch, Essex, England

Colonel Martin Bladen (1680–1746) was a British politician who sat in the Irish House of Commons from 1713 to 1727 and in the British House of Commons from 1715 to 1746. He was a Commissioner of the Board of Trade and Plantations, a Privy Councillor in Ireland and Comptroller of the Mint.

== Family ==
Martin was born in 1680 in Yorkshire and was the son of Nathaniel Bladen and Isabella Fairfax. His father was an attorney and Steward to Thomas Osborne, 1st Duke of Leeds (Lord Danby), his mother was the daughter of Sir William Fairfax of Steeton and was related to Lord Fairfax. Martin's older brother William Bladen was Attorney-General in Maryland and briefly Secretary of that Province and his nephew Thomas Bladen was Governor of Maryland in the 1740s. Martin's sister Elizabeth was the mother of Admiral Edward Hawke, 1st Baron Hawke. Martin acted as guardian to Admiral Hawke and supported his career advancement in the navy.

== Military career ==
After initial education in Yorkshire, Martin attended Westminster School where he was a Queen's Scholar at St Peter's College and then attended St John's College in Cambridge. He was admitted to the Inner Temple in 1698 but did not pursue a legal career. He joined the military in December 1697 as Ensign to Captain Jos. Fletcher in Brigadier-General Thomas Fairfax's Regiment of Foot, Fairfax being his uncle. After an initial posting to Ireland, his regiment was deployed in Spain, Gibraltar and Portugal in Marlborough's service. When the Earl of Galway, Henri de Massue de Ruvigny arrived as the new Generalissimo of the British Army, he took Bladen as his aide-de-camp. Bladen was appointed Colonel in 1709 though within the year he had sold his colonelcy and retired from the military.

== Political career ==
He commenced his career in politics by winning seats in 1713. He was elected as a Member of Parliament for Kinsale in County Cork, Ireland that year, though was defeated as MP for Saltash in Cornwall. In 1715 he won another Irish seat for Bandon but again lost a renewed attempt at Saltash, though succeeded in getting a seat in Stockbridge in Hampshire. He was MP for Maldon in Essex in 1734 and Portsmouth in 1741.

In 1714 he secured a position as Comptroller of the Royal Mint and, throughout his time at the Mint, Isaac Newton was the head of that organisation. Martin only left the Mint after the death of Newton many years later. This post was not full-time and allowed Martin to pursue other appointments, and in 1715 (after declining Sir Robert Walpole's offer to be Envoy to Switzerland) he accepted a position in Ireland as Chief Secretary to his old military commander the Earl of Galway and Charles Fitzroy, 2nd Duke of Grafton who held joint Governorship. Bladen shared his role there with Charles Delafaye. In 1715 he was made a Privy Councillor in Ireland.

In 1717 he was offered an appointment as Envoy Extraordinary to Spain to replace Mr Brett but declined it. Instead he was offered, and accepted, a post at the Board of Trade and Plantations and attended his first meeting on 19 July 1717 as Commissioner. Bladen was a Whig politician who consistently supported Robert Walpole throughout his tenure in office. In 1719 Bladen, along with Daniel Pulteney, was appointed by the Lord Justices to attend the Court of France to negotiate miscellaneous items outstanding from the Treaty of Utrecht in 1713, such as limits of plantations in America and losses of the Hudson's Bay Company. Whilst there he met with the 9-year-old Louis XV, his regent Philippe II, Duke of Orléans, Victor Marie d'Estrées, Duke of Estrées and Cardinal-Statesman Guillaume Dubois, when news came in that the French had captured the island of St Lucia. Bladen immediately raised the issue with his hosts who seemed initially unaware of the news.

In 1721 Bladen produced a lengthy report on the status of the colonies in America which was along the lines of William Blathwayt's report of 1701 which sought revocation of proprietary charters, though he offered up the suggestion of the colonies being unified under a single military figurehead, a Captain-General, and suggested New York as a suitable geographical base – an idea first suggested by William Penn in his 1697 'Plan of Union'. Bladen was convinced that Britain’s power and ability to trade favourably with other countries was greatly enhanced by the income from her colonies and, for economic reasons, it was vital for the colonies to serve the mother country and the appearance of a unified Britain with her colonies would deter other European colonial powers from attempting encroachment. A final report on British Colonies in America was produced in 1739 "Reasons for Appointing a Captain General for the Continent of North America" which was more conciliatory in tone than previous ones where preservation of trade with the American colonies was considered more important than their 'subjection'.

Bladen’s influence at the Board of Trade continued to grow through the 1730s and he attended a Conference at Antwerp to negotiate on tariffs. He also, in 1730, was present at the Board of Trade meeting when seven Indian Chiefs of the Cherokee Nation attended to ratify the 1730 British Cherokee Friendship Treaty. He was also instrumental in getting his nephew Thomas Bladen, later Governor of Maryland, into Parliament and the two consistently voted the same way on issues.

== Marriage and children ==
Martin married Mary Gibbs c1699. She was the daughter of Colonel John Gibbs, one time Governor of North Carolina and her mother was Elizabeth Pride, who was a descendant and heiress of George Monck, 1st Duke of Albemarle. Martin and Mary Bladen had one daughter, Isabella, who married John Tinker. Tinker and Isabella had two sons. Martin was brother-in-law to Nathaniel Rice, who was Secretary of the Royal Council of North Carolina and Acting Governor on two occasions. After Mary's death in 1724 Martin married in 1727/8 to Frances Foche/Jory, heiress of Colonel Joseph Jory, Agent for Nevis, and owner of a plantation and several properties. Frances inherited Aldborough Hatch in Barking in Essex, upon which Bladen built a new house where the couple lived. Frances had several children from her previous marriage to John Foche but all died within her lifetime. In later life, Martin was a Justice of the Peace and was largely responsible for driving highwayman Dick Turpin of the Gregory Gang out of Barking in Essex. Martin's town residence was a Georgian building at the south end of Hanover Square. He also owned the Barmoor Estate in Northumberland and leased the Prebendary Manor of Ketton in Rutland. His will made reference to a Porter family, who mostly predeceased him and may have been blood related, but their line died out by the 1750s. Martin died in February 1746.

=== Poetry, writings, and translations ===
Bladen translated from Latin in 1704 ‘C. Julius Caesar’s Commentaries of his Wars in Gaul, and Civil War with Pompey. To which is added Aulus Hirtius or Oppius’s Supplement of the Alexandrian, African and Spanish Wars With the Author’s Life.’ He dedicated this work to the Duke of Marlborough. He also wrote 'The History of the Last War in Spain: From 1702 to 1710. Wherein the Conduct of the British Ministry, the Allies, and the Generals in that Service are Fully Defended'. He also produced other works of poetry.

=== Legacy ===
Bladen County, North Carolina is named for him.

Political offices
Preceded by Joseph Addison	Chief Secretary for Ireland; 1715–1717; With: Charles Delafaye	Succeeded by Edward Webster
Preceded by Joseph Addison	Lord Commissioner of Trade and Foreign Plantations; 1717–1746	Succeeded by Hon. James Grenvile
Parliament of Great Britain
Preceded by Thomas Brodrick; The Earl of Barrymore	Member of Parliament for Stockbridge; 1715–1734; With: Thomas Brodrick 1715–1722; John Chetwynd 1722–1734	Succeeded by Sir Humphrey Monoux; John Montagu
Preceded by Henry Parsons; Thomas Bramston	Member of Parliament for Maldon; 1734–1741; With: Henry Parsons 1734–1740; Benjamin Keene 1740–1741	Succeeded by Sir Thomas Drury, Bt; Robert Colebrooke
Preceded by Edward Vernon; Philip Cavendish	Member of Parliament for Portsmouth; 1741–1746; With: Philip Cavendish 1741–1743; Sir Charles Hardy 1743–1744; Isaac Townsend 1744–1746	Succeeded by Thomas Gore; Isaac Townsend
