= Guy Fairfax =

English judge

Sir Guy Fairfax (died 1495), was an English judge.

Fairfax was of a Yorkshire family, and third son of Richard Fairfax of Walton, by his wife, Anastasia, daughter of John Carthorpe. He is mentioned in 1421 as seised of the manor of Hameldene, being then very young. From his father he inherited the manor of Steeton in North Yorkshire, where he built a castle. At first he seems to have been occupied with purely local business. He was in the commission of array for the West Riding in 1435, and in 1460 was commissioned to inquire what lands there were in that riding belonging to Richard, duke of York, who had been attainted in the previous parliament.

One of his colleagues was Sir William Plumpton, whose counsel he afterwards was in 1469. He first appears in the year-books in Michaelmas 1463 as a serjeant and member of Gray's Inn. On 28 April 1468 he was appointed King's serjeant, and in 1476 became Recorder of York. He was raised to a judgeship of the King's bench and is first mentioned as a judge in Trinity term (around mid April to end of June) 1477. In this office he won an honourable reputation, and on 8 October 1482 he received a grant of a hundred merks yearly in addition to his salary. He was continued in his judgeship on each subsequent Demise of the Crown, and under Edward V became chief justice of Lancaster.

In about 1474, Fairfax rebuilt Steeton Hall, south-west of York.

He died in 1495. By his wife, Margaret, a daughter of Sir William Ryther, he had six children, four sons (the eldest, William, a Judge of the Common Pleas under Henry VIII) and two daughters.
