= Newton Kyme Hall =

Grade II* listed building in England

Coordinates: 53°53′54″N 1°17′36″W

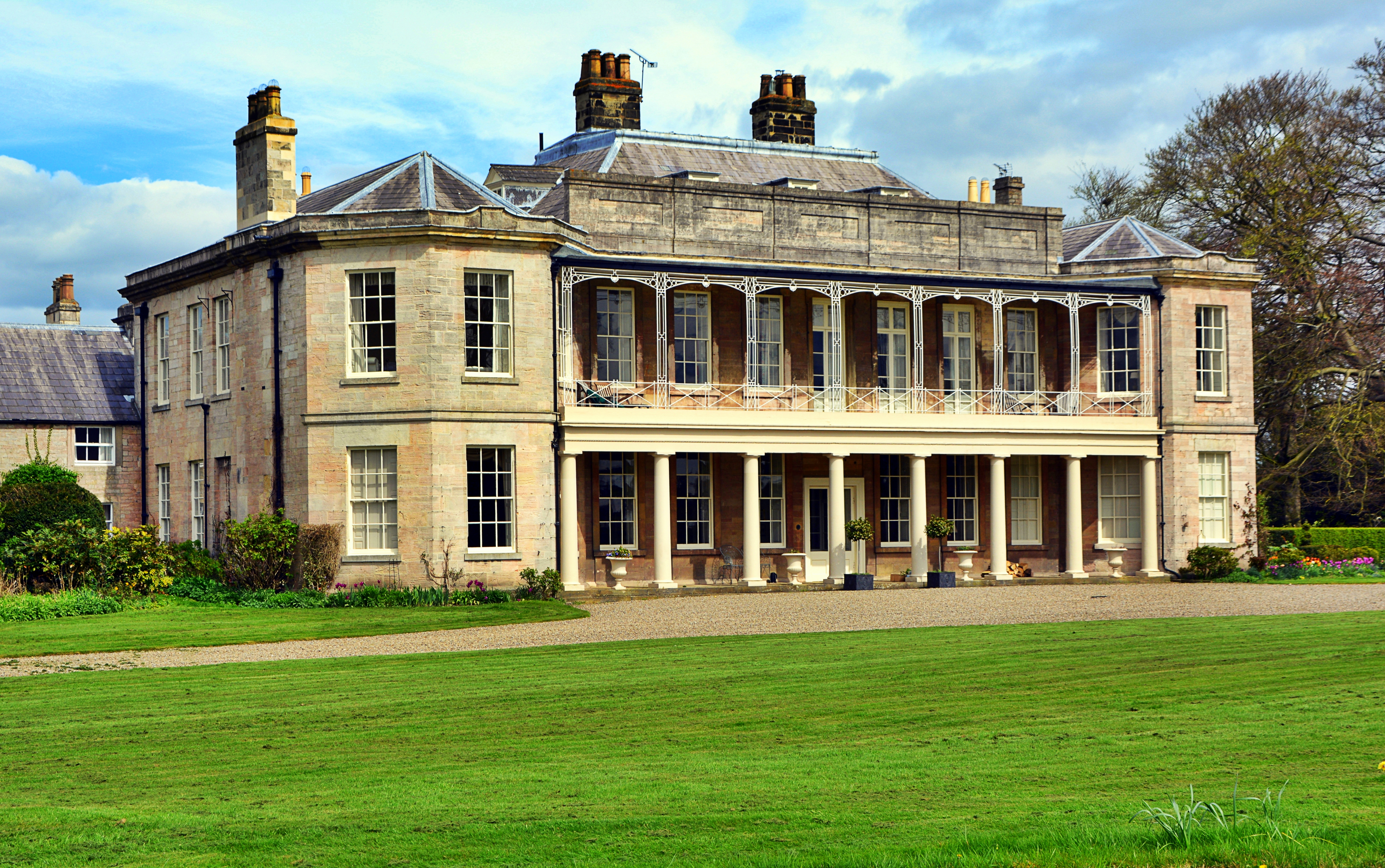
The hall, in 2018

Newton Kyme Hall is a historic building in the village of Newton Kyme, north-west of Tadcaster in North Yorkshire, in England.

The hall's origins lie in the 17th century, but it was rebuilt for Robert Fairfax in about 1720. At this time, the gardens were landscaped, to incorporate the remains of Kyme Castle. In the 19th century, wings were added at right and left, and a kitchen block at the rear left, and a colonnade was added to the front. A coach house and stables were built north of the hall, and a groom's house to their south-west. The hall remained in private hands, other than during World War II, when it served as Air Defence Headquarters. It was later divided into three properties. The house was Grade II* listed in 1952, while the coach house and stables, groom's house, and castle remains, are all Grade II listed.

The hall is built of Magnesian Limestone and sandstone, with a Welsh slate roof. The central wing is two storeys high with an attic, and 7 bays wide, while the left and right wings are single storey. At the front is a Doric order portico with a wrought iron trellis. There are sash windows throughout, some with shutters, and three sets of 20th century double doors give access to a balcony. Inside, there is an 18th-century staircase in a hall with panelling and Ionic order pilasters, with the first floor hall being similar. The right-hand ground floor room has an Ionic portico and a moulded cornice.

The garden has an avenue of lime trees leading from the hall to the Tadcaster road, originally planted in the early 18th century, but cut down in the 1990s and replaced by a wider avenue of young trees. The garden also includes a large rockery, and a ha-ha, in addition to the castle ruins.
