= Newton Kyme =

Village in North Yorkshire, England

Coordinates: 53.898°N 1.295°W

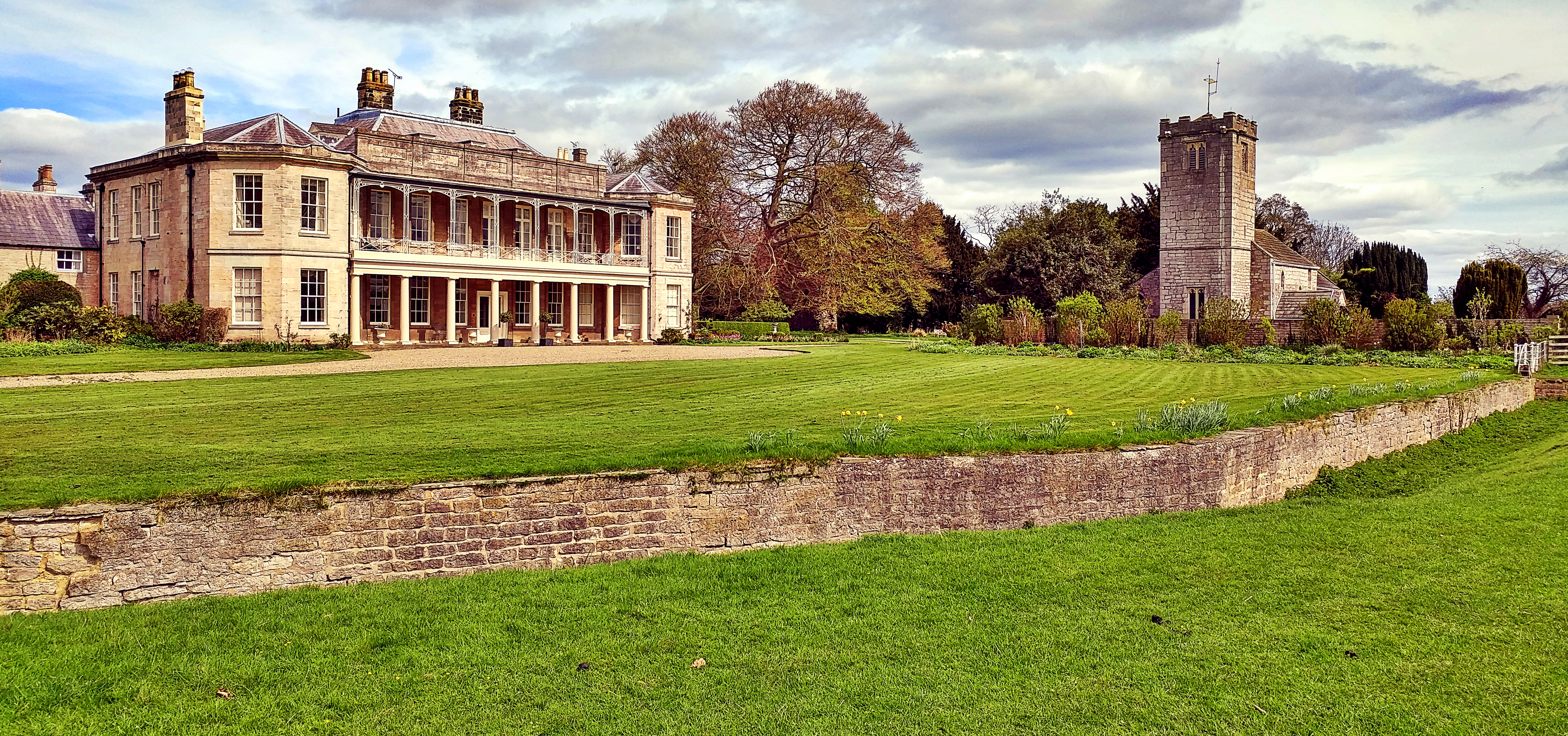
- Newton Kyme Hall and St Andrew's Church

- Location within North Yorkshire
- Population: 275 (2011 Census)
- Civil parish: Newton Kyme cum Toulston
- Unitary authority: North Yorkshire
- Ceremonial county: North Yorkshire
- Region: Yorkshire and the Humber
- Country: England
- Sovereign state: United Kingdom
- Post town: Tadcaster
- Postcode district: LS24
- Police: North Yorkshire
- Fire: North Yorkshire
- Ambulance: Yorkshire
- UK Parliament: Wetherby and Easingwold

Newton Kyme is a village in North Yorkshire, England, 1.5 miles (2.4 km) north west of Tadcaster and 5 miles (8 km) east of Wetherby. It lies on the south bank of the River Wharfe, just off the A659 road.

Newton Kyme is the only village in the civil parish of Newton Kyme cum Toulston. The population of the civil parish at the 2011 Census was 275. Newton Kyme has a church and a castle called Kyme Castle.

== Toponym ==
The village was recorded in the Domesday Book as Neuua tun, meaning New homestead (or village) in Old English. The suffix Kyme was added in the 13th century, a surname of one of the manorial families in the village. In the 13th century, the manor and advowson passed to the Kyme family who originated at Kesteven in Lincolnshire.

== History ==
Newton Kyme is mentioned in the Domesday Book as belonging to Count Robert of Mortain, having 15 villagers and one priest. A church has been known on the site since at least the 12th century, and the current structure, the St Andrew's Church, is grade I listed.

West of the village is the site of two Roman forts, two Roman camps, and Iron Age enclosure, Bronze Age barrows and a Neolithic henge monument. the site has been designated as a scheduled monument. the Newton Kyme Hall and estate was built in the 18th century by Admiral Robert Fairfax. The hall is grade II* listed with extensive landscaped gardens. Kyme Castle, the site of which lies to the east of the hall, was possibly the seat of the Fairfaxes until Robert Fairfax built Newton Kyme Hall. The castle is believed to have fallen into ruins in the 16th century.

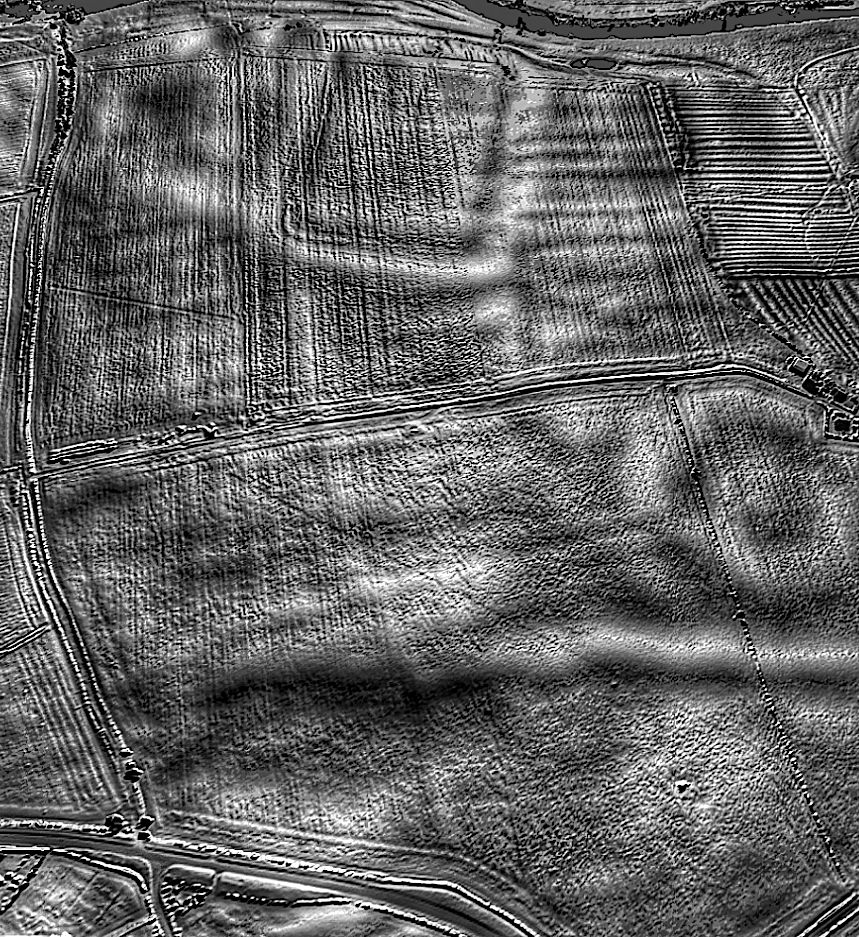
A lidar view of the henge and the site of two Roman forts.

Newton Kyme used to have a railway station on the Harrogate–Church Fenton line, which was located on the south side of the A659 road. It was closed down in 1964. A paper and packaging mill used to be located in the parish, but this was closed in 2001 and was derelict until 2016, when a new set of houses were built on the site.

At the 2001 Census, the parish had a population of 281, which had fallen slightly to 275 by the time of the 2011 Census. In 2015, North Yorkshire County Council estimated the population to be 270.

The village was historically in the West Riding of Yorkshire until 1974. From 1974 to 2023 it was part of the Selby District. It is now administered by the unitary North Yorkshire Council.

== Toulston ==
Toulston was a deserted medieval village, 1 mile south west of Newton Kyme. Its site is now a scheduled monument. Toulston was recorded in Domesday Book in the form Tog(e)leston. The name was derived from an Old Norse personal name Toglos.

== Notable people ==
- Robert Fairfax, an admiral in the Royal Navy, was born and is buried in the village
- Felicity Lane-Fox, Baroness Lane-Fox, Conservative peer
- Owen Oglethorpe, Bishop of Carlisle who crowned Queen Elizabeth I

== See also ==
- Listed buildings in Newton Kyme cum Toulston
