= William Bladen (mayor) =

Mayor of Dublin, Ireland

William Bladen (1585–1663) was a bookseller and printer in London and Dublin in the 17th century. He served as Sheriff, Alderman and Mayor (1647–1648) of Dublin and was present in Dublin during the Irish Rebellion from 1641 to 1642.

== Early days ==
William was the son of Thomas Bladen, a yeoman of Newton Solney in Derbyshire and was sent to London with his younger brother Richard to undertake an apprenticeship in 1602. Records for the Stationers Company show him being freed from his apprenticeship on 7 May 1610 after which he began trading in his own right at St Paul's Churchyard in London, under the sign of the Bible next to the great door of St Paul's. Some of the early publications he printed were in partnership with John Royston. His former apprenticeship master, Arthur Johnson, went to Ireland in 1624 on behalf of the Stationers Company who wanted to establish an outlet in Dublin and, by 1626, William left London and took his family to Dublin. After Johnson's death in 1631 William took over the business and bought out his Stationers Company partners. He became the King's Printer and had a monopoly on printing, at least on official and state matters. He traded at Castle Street, Dublin close to Werburgh Street where he was shown on the 1659 Census of Ireland as residing.

== Irish Rebellion ==
During the 1641 Irish Rebellion, Bladen kept a journal of events which he sent to his son in London for him to publish as he had seen unreliable and inaccurate reports of occurrences and wanted to set the record straight. Although Bladen was clearly a supporter of the English Protestant administration in Dublin, his letters equally described brutalities that were carried out by his own side as well as the 'rebels'. He served as Mayor of Dublin from 1647–48.

Bladen retained his print monopoly in the English Civil War years and during the Irish Confederacy, becoming Commonwealth Printer but, after the Restoration, he was unable to regain the title. He had perhaps been tarnished by association with Oliver Cromwell because Charles II gave the title to the Crooke printers instead. He remained in Dublin for the rest of his days and contributed financially to the restoration of St Werburgh's Church.

== Family ==
Bladen married twice. His first marriage was to Mary Young in 1612 and they had at least two sons: Thomas Bladen and a younger son, William, who managed the Bladen print business in London. Bladen and his second wife, Eleanor Pemberton, were married in 1654 in Dublin. His son, Thomas, continued the print business in Dublin after his father's death in 1663.

Civic offices
Preceded by William Smith	Mayor of Dublin; 1647–1648	Succeeded by John Pue
