= Thomas Bladen (priest) =

Anglo-Irish priest

Thomas Bladen (1615 – 1695) was an Anglo-Irish priest in the seventeenth century. The eldest son and heir of William Bladen of Newton Solney in South Derbyshire and Mary Young, his family left London in 1626 where they had a printing/bookselling business at St Paul's Churchyard to live amongst Protestant settlers in Dublin.

Thomas attended Trinity College Dublin from 1631–37 and became a Doctor of Divinity. During the Irish Rebellion of 1641, Thomas was under siege at Geashill Castle with the Digby family (headed by the widowed Lady Offaly).

== Appointments ==
On 25 March 1645 Thomas became the Vicar of St Margaret's Church in Rainham, Kent, a position he was to retain for ten years, after which he returned to Ireland as Commonwealth Minister of Duleek. In 1658 he was appointed Minister of Drogheda and then, two years later, he became Prebend of Dunlavin, St Patrick's Cathedral in Dublin. He was the Prebend of St John the Evangelist Church in Dublin from 1660 to his death 35 years later and in 1662 he was appointed Rector of Kilskeire (County Meath), Killallon, Daimer (Barony of Fowre) and Grilly (Meath). Three months later he became Chaplain-in-Ordinary to the Duke of Ormond, the Lord Lieutenant of Ireland.

When his father died the following year, Thomas assumed responsibility for the family's printing and book-selling business in Castle Street, Dublin and in London. In 1666 he was appointed Dean of Ardfert (West Ireland). In 1681 he served as Dean of St. Andrew's in Dublin and, along with Peter Manby, he applied to be Dean to replace Ezekiel Hopkins, Bishop of Raphoe. He was not successful and neither was Manby who, in his disappointment, turned to the Catholic Church where he perceived there were more opportunities for advancement. The satirist Jonathan Swift held Bladen in some contempt, stating "Quid obstat, Dii boni, quominus Dr Bladen fiat Episcopus" (What, dear gods, prevents Dr Bladen from becoming bishop?).

== Print Business ==
After his father's death in 1663, Thomas took over the Bladen print and book-selling business which had a presence in both Dublin and London, though in a supervisory capacity, as he continued his ministry too. He never managed to regain the title of King's Printer and subsequently Commonwealth Printer, which his father had enjoyed as a monopoly. After the Restoration, other printers moved into the market.

== Family ==
Thomas Bladen married at least three times: firstly to Martha Spencer on 8 August 1650 at St. Peter-le-Poer in London. Secondly he married on 17 March 1657 to Catherine Turner at St Michan's Church, Dublin. Catherine died in 1690 and, within a year, Thomas had married his last wife, Hon. Sarah Blayney, daughter of Henry 2nd Lord Blayney, Baron of Monaghan by Hon. Jane Moore, daughter of 1st Viscount Drogheda. The family resided in 1680 at Glebe House, 14 Fishamble Street in Dublin. He had numerous children including a son Charles who married, in 1680, to Letitia Loftus, daughter of Dr Dudley Loftus.
