= St Andrew's Church, Newton Kyme =

Church in North Yorkshire, England

Coordinates: 53.8980°N 1.2926°W

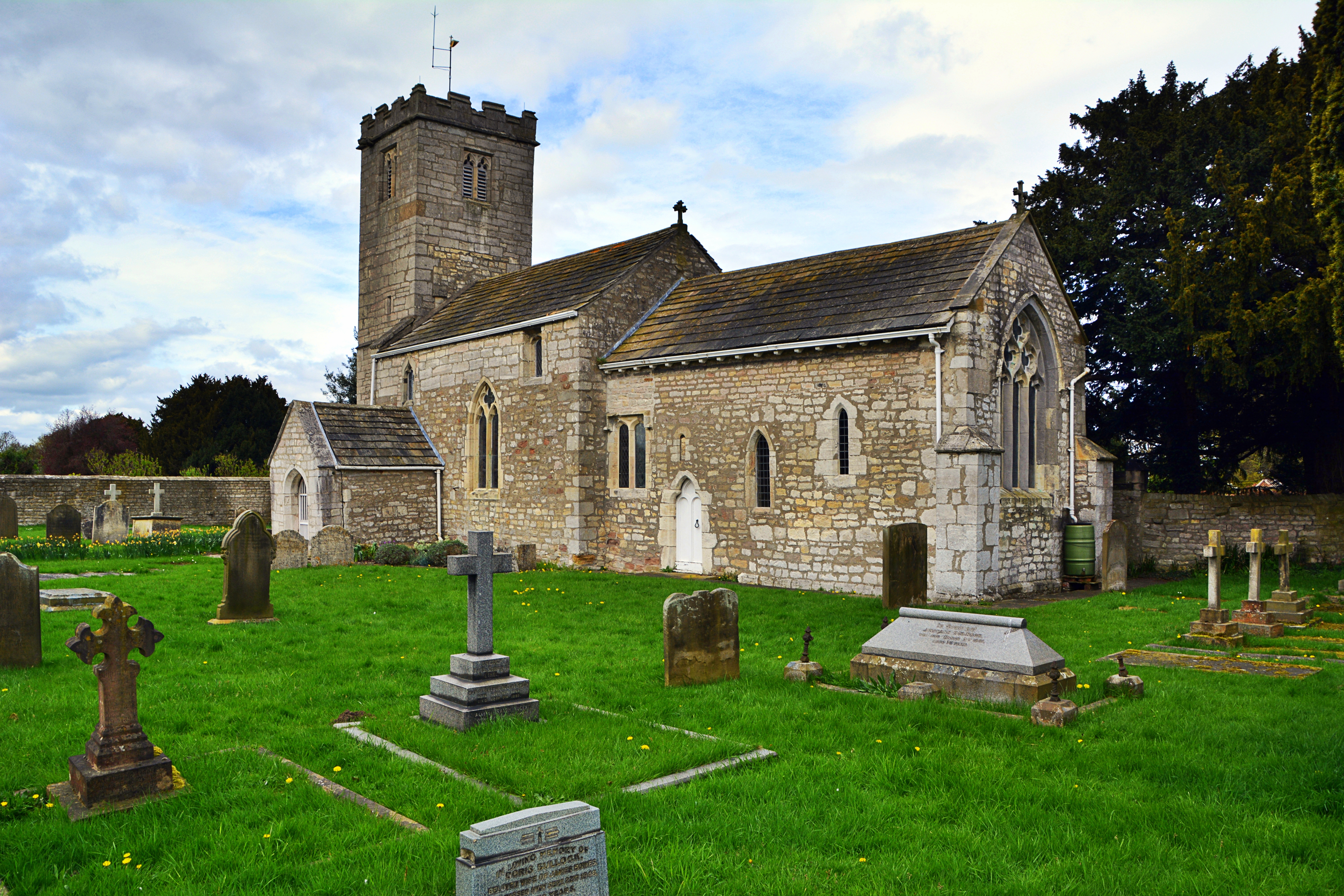
The church, from the southeast in 2018

St Andrew's Church is the parish church of Newton Kyme, a village west of Tadcaster, in North Yorkshire, in England.

The church was originally built in the 12th century, with the nave, western part of the chancel, and lower part of the tower surviving from this date. The Fairfax Chapel was added in about 1290, and the nave arcade is of similar date. The belfry and the majority of the windows date from the 15th century. In 1883, the floor and the seating were replaced, the roof was opened up, some 13th century windows were reopened, and a screen was added to create a vestry. In 1938, the bells were recast and rehung. The church was grade I listed in 1985.

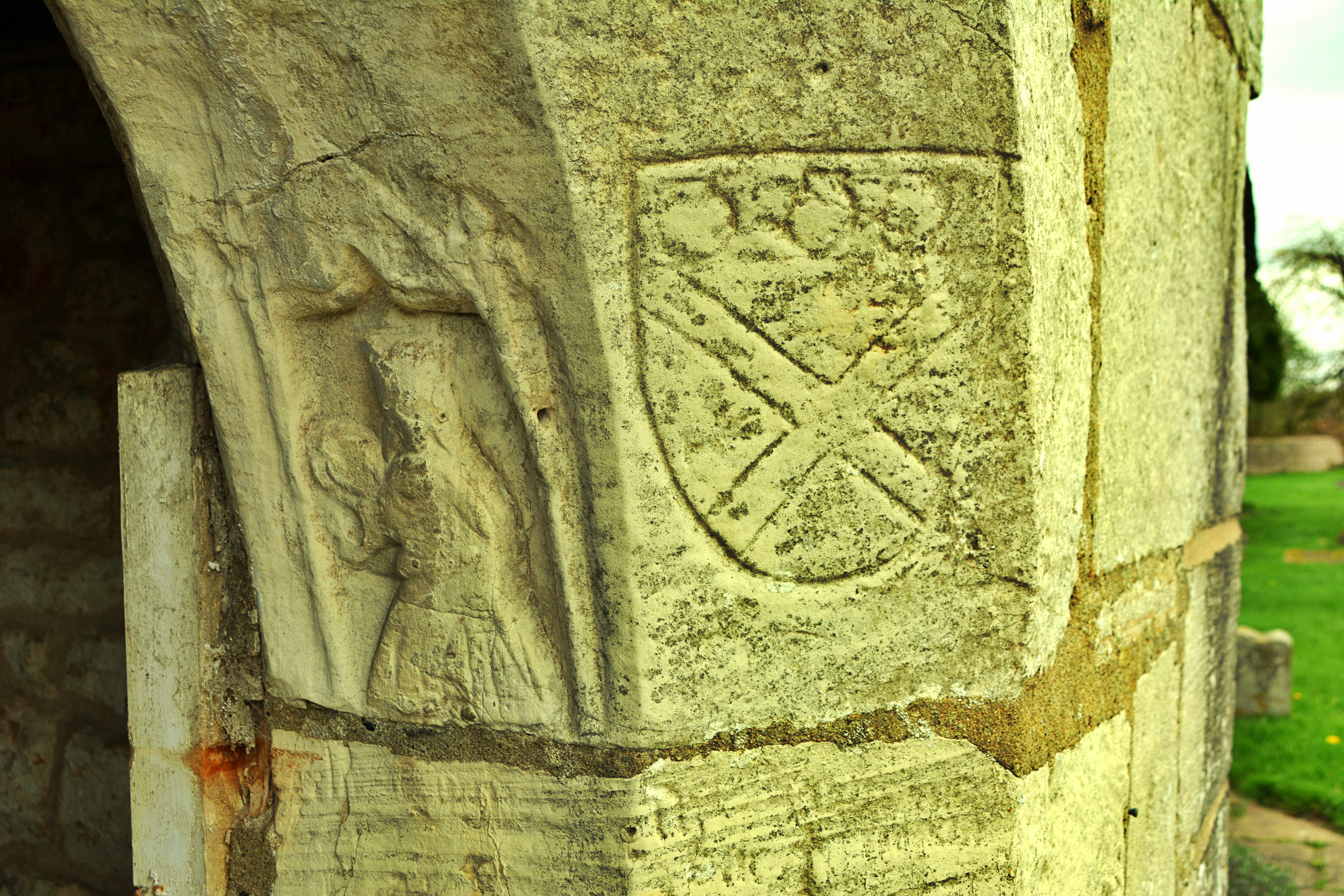
The coat of arms and Virgin and Child, in 2018

The church is built of Magnesian Limestone, with a roof of stone slates. It has a nave with a north aisle and a south porch, and a chancel with the Fairfax Chapel on the north side. There is a two-stage west tower with gargoyles and battlements. The porch has a pointed arch, inscribed with various figures: a cow, a boar's head, and a coat of arms, plus reliefs of the Virgin and Child and a St Andrew's Cross. The chancel has a priest's door, and a piscina and sedilia dating from about 1220.

Other features inside the church include a 12th century font, with 19th century cover and base; a sculpture of a head dating from 1613; a monument to Robert Fairfax from 1725, and a wooden one to Katherine Stapilton, from 1695. An oak sanctuary chair and eagle lectern were stolen from the church in recent years.

== See also ==
- Grade I listed buildings in North Yorkshire (district)
- Listed buildings in Newton Kyme cum Toulston
