= Nathaniel Bladen =

English barrister

Nathaniel Bladen (born 1642) was an English barrister who was Steward to the Earl of Danby for twenty years as Danby rose to be the most powerful politician of the day before he was engulfed in the Popish Plot and incarcerated in the Tower of London.

== Family ==
Nathaniel was the grandson of Robert Bladen c1580-1647 who was Steward to Sir Francis Wortley and Robert resided, for some years, at Askwith close to Denton Hall, home of Thomas Fairfax, 1st Lord Fairfax of Cameron. In later life he worked in a similar capacity for Sir William Savile who, like Wortley, was a staunch Royalist supporter in the English Civil War. Nathaniel's father John (only son of Robert) was a lawyer who was employed by the Fairfax family. During the Civil War he joined 3rd Lord Thomas Fairfax’s regiment as a Captain but, after joining the Defence Committee to protect Hull, he found himself accused by that same Committee of being a turncoat and assisting the enemy. He was required to pay a fine by the Committee for Compounding with Delinquents. Nathaniel's maternal grandfather, Nathaniel Birkhead, after whom he was named, jointly purchased Hague Hall in South Kirkby, with Robert Bladen though the property ended up in sole ownership of Birkhead. Nathaniel Bladen had inheritances from both grandfathers: Robert Bladen and Nathaniel Birkhead - though Birkhead had objected to the marriage of his daughter Margaret to Bladen's son John.

Bladen was the father of William Bladen - Attorney-General of Maryland and Colonel Martin Bladen- Commissioner of the Board of Trade and Plantations, Grandfather of Thomas Bladen - Governor of Maryland and Admiral Hawke.

== Early life ==
Nathaniel was born in 1642 just weeks after King Charles raised his Royal Standard at Nottingham to signal the start of the Civil War. His mother, Margaret Birkhead (c1622-42) died at his birth and his father John had died between 1645 and 1649. Orphaned as an infant, he was raised by his grandmother Elizabeth (Lacy) and then an Aunt Clarke (sister of his father John Bladen) and a guardian, Robert Wrightson (1629–1708) of Hemsworth. Wrightson supported Bladen's education and training as a lawyer and the two remained friends for many years with Wrightson purchasing parts of Bladen's estate and the advowson of Hemsworth Church.

== Marriage and Children ==
He married Isabella Fairfax - daughter of Sir William Fairfax (soldier) of Steeton in Yorkshire and they had six surviving children: Isabella c1669-97, Catherine c1671-1713+, William 1673–1718, Frances c1675-1730, Elizabeth 1677-1748 and Colonel Martin Bladen 1680–1746. Nathaniel's mother-in-law Dame Frances Fairfax (née Challoner) brought a Chancery Bill over the advowson of Hemsworth Church and his other inherited property which had been acquired by Wrightson.

== Steward to the Earl of Danby ==
Nathaniel was employed by the Earl of Danby, his son Edward Osborne Viscount Latimer and Danby's daughter Bridget, Countess of Plymouth over a period of twenty years from the mid-1660s to the late 1680s. During this time Danby rose from being Treasurer to Privy Councillor and Chief Minister until his enemies found a way to topple him from power. Danby was implicated in the Popish Plot and, as his Steward, Bladen was involved too; he regularly visited Danby when he was locked up in the Tower and liaised with those involved.

== Steward to the Countess of Plymouth ==
During the 1680s Bladen also acted as Steward to the Countess of Plymouth who was Danby's recently widowed daughter whose husband had been Charles FitzCharles, 1st Earl of Plymouth, illegitimate son of King Charles II. After several years service, the Countess, in 1686, believed that Bladen had been embezzling from her and brought a Chancery Bill against him which was non-suited.

== Steward to the Duchess of Buckingham ==
In Nathaniel's last role as Steward in a noble household, he was engaged by the Duchess of Buckingham who was his wife's relation, being the daughter of 3rd Lord Fairfax. The estate of the widowed Duchess had been impoverished under her husband's management and so Bladen could only look after that part of her estate not already in the hands of the courts and bailiffs. An annuity granted by the Duchess to Nathaniel and his wife was halted after a few years and became the subject of a dispute. Nathaniel's daughters brought action against Lady Ash of Twickenham, the prospective purchaser of the Duchess's Nunappleton estate, for non-payment of the annuity.

== White Paper Making ==
Bladen purchased Letters Patent in 1682 from Eustace Burnaby and Henry Million for the manufacture of white paper. He paid £150 for Burnaby's 1675 Letters Patent and then, two years later, purchased more of Burnaby's interests (for a new invention or mill) for £240. Bladen subsequently obtained Letters Patent for same. Since Bladen later stated himself to have an interest in Colnett Mill in Bucks, this is perhaps the same one he acquired from Burnaby. Colnett Mill in Wraysbury (east of Windsor) was situated on the Colne Brooke and had been used as a paper mill since 1605. Since the local government re-organisation of 1974 this area was transferred from Buckinghamshire to Windsor. Soon after the transactions were complete, Burnaby decided he wanted his Letters Patents and interests back from Bladen and offered him £1,500. Burnaby appears to have been acting as an agent for Lady Theodosia Ivy and her land was put at his disposal to raise the sum. Ivy's land in Wapping Marsh was assigned to Bladen to cover the amount, indeed it probably exceeded the value needed and so Bladen gave over his interest in Colnett Mill to her. Bladen held a mortgage on Lady Ivy's lands and when she failed to pay interest, a third party took possession. Despite this, Lady Ivy left the same land in Wapping (Babsfield) to her relations in her Will, thereby leaving all parties in dispute for many years.

== Descendants ==
Amongst many notable descendants of Nathaniel Bladen and Isabella:

- Eldest son William Bladen was attorney-general at Maryland whilst his son Thomas became governor during the 1740s
- Second son Martin Bladen fought in Marlborough's Wars, was a Privy Councillor in Ireland, Comptroller of the Mint and a commissioner at the Board of Trade and Plantations
- Daughter Elizabeth married lawyer Edward Hawke, and their son was the hero of the Battle of Quiberon Bay, Admiral Edward Hawke.
