= Steeton, North Yorkshire =

Civil parish in North Yorkshire, England

Coordinates: 53.892°N 1.203°W

Steeton
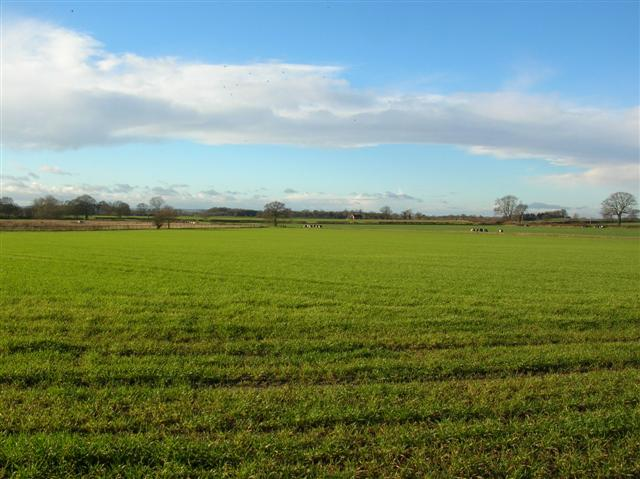

- Location within North Yorkshire
- Area: 4.63 km^{2} (1.79 sq mi)
- Population: 27 (2001 census)
  - Density: 6/km^{2} (16/sq mi)
- Civil parish: Steeton
- Unitary authority: North Yorkshire
- Ceremonial county: North Yorkshire
- Region: Yorkshire and the Humber
- Country: England
- Sovereign state: United Kingdom
- Post town: TADCASTER
- Postcode district: LS24
- Dialling code: 01937
- Police: North Yorkshire
- Fire: North Yorkshire
- Ambulance: Yorkshire
- UK Parliament: Wetherby and Easingwold

Steeton is a civil parish about 6 miles (10 km) from York, in North Yorkshire, England. In 2001 the parish had a population of 27. The parish touches Appleton Roebuck, Bilbrough, Bolton Percy, Catterton, Colton, Oxton and Tadcaster.

From 1974 to 2023 it was part of the Selby District, it is now administered by the unitary North Yorkshire Council.

== Landmarks ==
There are four listed buildings. including Steeton Hall Farm, a grade II* listed house built in about 1474.

== History ==
The name "Steeton" means 'Stub ton', 'Tree-stump farm/settlement'. Steeton was recorded in the Domesday Book as Stiueton/Stiuetone/Stiuetune. Steeton is a deserted medieval village that was thought to have been depopulated except for the Fairfax family by about 1485. The remains of the centre of the village were destroyed in the early 16th century by the construction of a pond. Steeton was formerly a township in the parish of Bolton Percy, in 1866 Steeton became a civil parish in its own right.
