= Vaughn =

Vaughn may refer to:

== People ==
- Vaughn (surname), list of notable people with the surname

As a given name

- Vaughn Bodē (1941–1975), underground comics writer
- Vaughn Duggins (born 1987), American basketball player
- Vaughn Flora (1945–2022), American politician
- Vaughn Meader (1936–2004), American comedian and impressionist
- Vaughn Monroe (1911–1973), American singer
- Vaughn Rasberry, American academic
- Vaughn Taylor (1910–1983), American movie and TV actor
- Vaughn Taylor (born 1976), American golf-player
- Vaughn van Jaarsveld (born 1985), South African cricketer
- Vaughn Walker (born 1944), federal judge

== Places in the United States ==
- Vaughn, California, former name of Bodfish, California
- Vaughn, Montana
- Vaughn, New Mexico
- Vaughn, Oregon
- Vaughn, Pennsylvania
- Vaughn, Virginia
- Vaughn, Washington

== Other ==
- Vaughn College of Aeronautics and Technology, New York
- Vaughn (band), hard rock band
- Vaughn Hockey, sports equipment maker

== See also ==
- Vaughan (disambiguation)
  - Vaughan (surname)
  - Vaughan (given name)
- Justice Vaughn (disambiguation)
- Vagn, a given name
- Von (disambiguation)
