= Woolbrook =

Woolbrook may refer to:

- Woolbrook, New South Wales, Australia
- A tributary of the River Sid in East Devon, England
- A suburb of Sidmouth, East Devon, England
