= Sidmouth Harbour Railway =

Disused, short-lived railway line in Devon, England

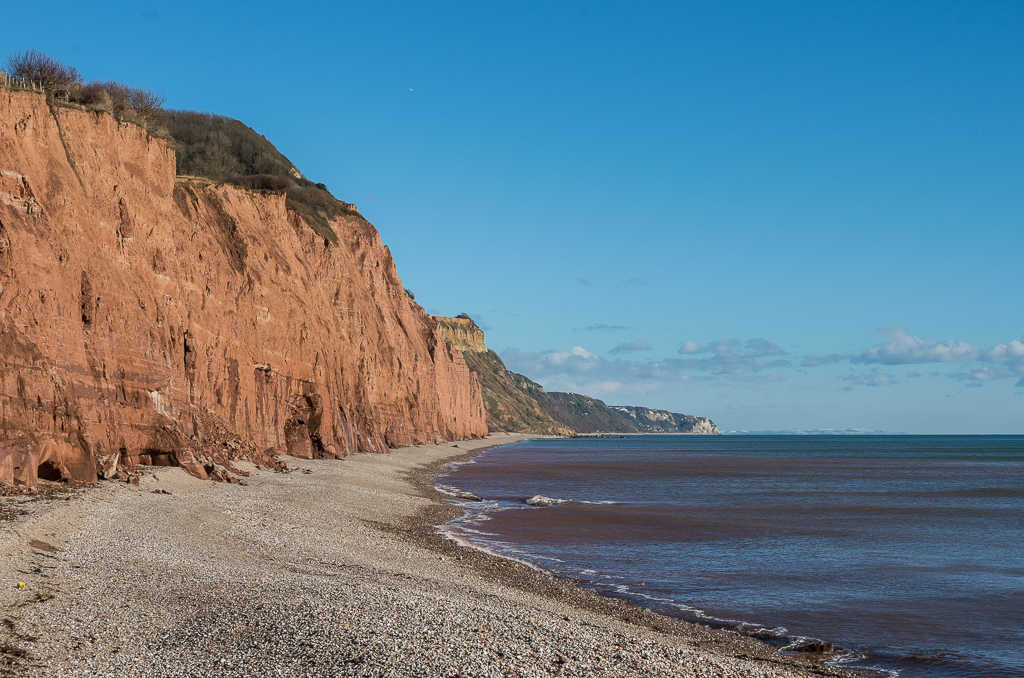
- Salcombe Hill cliff, through which the tunnel was constructed

Overview
- Status: Abandoned
- Locale: Sidmouth, Devon, England

History
- Construction start: 1836
- Plan abandoned: 1838

Technical
- Track gauge: 3 ft 6 in (1,067 mm)

The Sidmouth Harbour Railway was a short-lived attempt in the 1830s to create a harbour in the bay at Sidmouth, Devon on the south coast of England. To enable its construction a railway was built along the seafront and then via a tunnel in the cliff east of the town towards natural deposits at Hook Ebb. Only a few traces of the railway and tunnel remain today.

== History ==
In the early years of the nineteenth century Sidmouth had been a popular seaside resort, but its popularity was declining; at the same time the small, exposed harbour was shoaling badly, and local promoters considered building a properly protected harbour, by the construction of two stone piers at the Chit Rocks, at the western end of Sidmouth sea front. Plentiful supplies of suitable stone were available at Hook Ebb, a location on the coast 1.75 miles (2.8 km) to the east beneath Salcombe Hill.

An Act of Parliament for the work was obtained in 1836, and the railway was duly laid. Foundation stones for each of the two piers were formally laid amid considerable ceremony, befitting the intended dedication of the piers to, respectively, Her Imperial Highness The Grand Duchess Helena of Russia, and Princess Victoria (later to become Queen Victoria).

The railway ran parallel to the sea front, and along the esplanade at Sidmouth itself. It crossed the shingle beach at the River Sid outfall on a small viaduct then went through a tunnel about a 0.3 miles (0.5 km) long through Salcombe Hill behind the cliff face.

The railway seems to have been of 3 ft 6 in (1,067 mm), with track consisting of longitudinal wooden beams 6.5 by 4 inches with a 3/8 inch plate on the top. In the shingle the railway was fixed in place by vertical timber piles.

A local blacksmith constructed a machine to pull the wagons loaded with the stone; the machine relied on human muscle power and was found to be inadequate. Apparently (Note: Messenger makes it clear that he regards the locomotive story as highly dubious; Maggs, writing three years later seems to have accepted the story as factual) a locomotive was now ordered, and brought by coastal ship to the shore at Sidmouth; however there was no craneage available to unload it, so the ship was taken to Exmouth, where the locomotive was unloaded and brought to Sidmouth by horse and cart.

On placing the locomotive on the track at Sidmouth, it was discovered that it was too large to pass through the tunnel, and the scheme to use it was abandoned. Afterwards, the remaining railway seems to have been used to give novelty pleasure rides for a period.

By 1838 the locomotive was removed, as was also the viaduct at Sidmouth. By this time £12,000 of the £15,000 projected cost of building the harbour had been expended, and nothing further was done, the subscribers having nothing to show for their investment.

== Current state ==
Within the cliff section, much of the tunnel remains in place. On the beach section, storm action in 1966-1967 exposed a considerable length of the piles of the railway.
