= Ladram Bay =

Bay on the south coast of Devon, England

Coordinates: 50.65853°N 3.28029°W

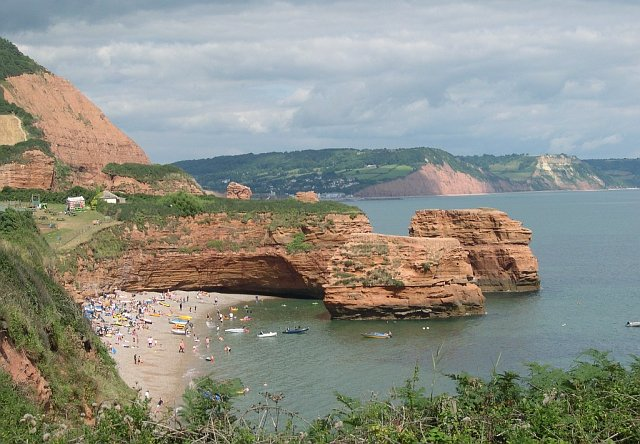
Ladram Bay, looking towards Sidmouth

Ladram Bay is a secluded bay with a pebble beach, on the south coast of Devon, England, between the coastal towns Budleigh Salterton and Sidmouth. It is about 11 miles (18 kilometres) southeast of Exeter, just under 2 mi (3 km) southwest of Sidmouth and about 2 1/2 miles (4 km) northeast of Budleigh Salterton.

Directly southwest of Ladram Bay are Smallstones Point and Chiselbury Bay. To the east is a hill called High Peak and below the hill are the Hern Point and Big Picket Rocks.

== Geology ==
Among the most impressive sights along the Jurassic Coast are the sea stacks at Ladram Bay. The sandstones contain many vertical fractures and joints that were formed deep in the Earth's crust during past mountain building periods. The sea picked out these planes of weakness to form caves and natural arches that have since collapsed to produce sea stacks. The “Otter Sandstone” that forms the cliffs and sea stacks were deposited in a hot dry climates in the Triassic Period, about 220 million years ago. The stacks are composed of the same rock, which is relatively soft, but they have a harder band of sandstone at their base which prevents their rapid erosion by the sea. The striking red colour of the rock is caused by iron oxide, which indicate that the layers were formed in a desert. The presence of ripple marks and channels in the sandstones, together with remains of the long-extinct plants, insects, fish, amphibians and reptiles, show the desert was crossed by fertile river valleys.

The Otter Sandstone Formation is the richest source of Triassic reptile remains in Britain and one of the most important in the world. At the south-west end of the bay, the most common fossils in the sandstone are networks of vertical, tube-like carbonate petrifactions (rhizocretions): these represent the roots of plants that were able to survive in the harsh dry climate of the Triassic Period.

The bay is sited on the same band of sandstone that forms the oil reservoir at the Wytch Farm oilfield on the Isle of Purbeck.

== Leisure ==
The holiday park at Ladram Bay is the second largest holiday centre in Devon. It was started by FWS Carter in 1950. It is the site of the first digital TV transponder in the United Kingdom.

The site has got many amenities, including a shop, nightly entertainment, a restaurant, and more. There is a daily kids club (run by the Ladram entertainment team) that includes rock painting, nature walks, and more.
