= Von (disambiguation) =

Von is a Germanic-language preposition that approximately means of or from. When it prefixes a surname it is not capitalized unless it begins a sentence.

Von can mean the following:

== People ==
- Drake Von (born 2002), American pornographic film actor
- Eerie Von (born 1964), original bassist for the metal band Danzig
- King Von (1994–2020), African American rapper
- Ronnie Von (born 1944), Brazilian singer and television host
- Von R. Eshleman, American astronomer
- Von Freeman (1923–2012), American jazz saxophonist
- Von Hayes (born 1958), American baseball player
- Von Joshua (born 1948), American baseball player
- Von McDaniel (1939–1995), American baseball player
- Von Miller (born 1989), American football player
- Von Wafer (born 1985), American basketball player
- Von Von Von, a character created by the humorist Hugh Gallagher

== Music ==
- Von (band), an American black metal band formed in 1987
- Von (album) by Sigur Rós
- The Von, an American rock band formed in 2013
- King Von, an American rapper known for 'drill rap.'

== Acronym ==
- Victorian Order of Nurses
- Voice of Nigeria

== See also ==
- Vons (disambiguation)
- Vaughn (disambiguation)
- Vaughan (disambiguation)
