= Sidmouth Museum =

Museum in Sidmouth, England

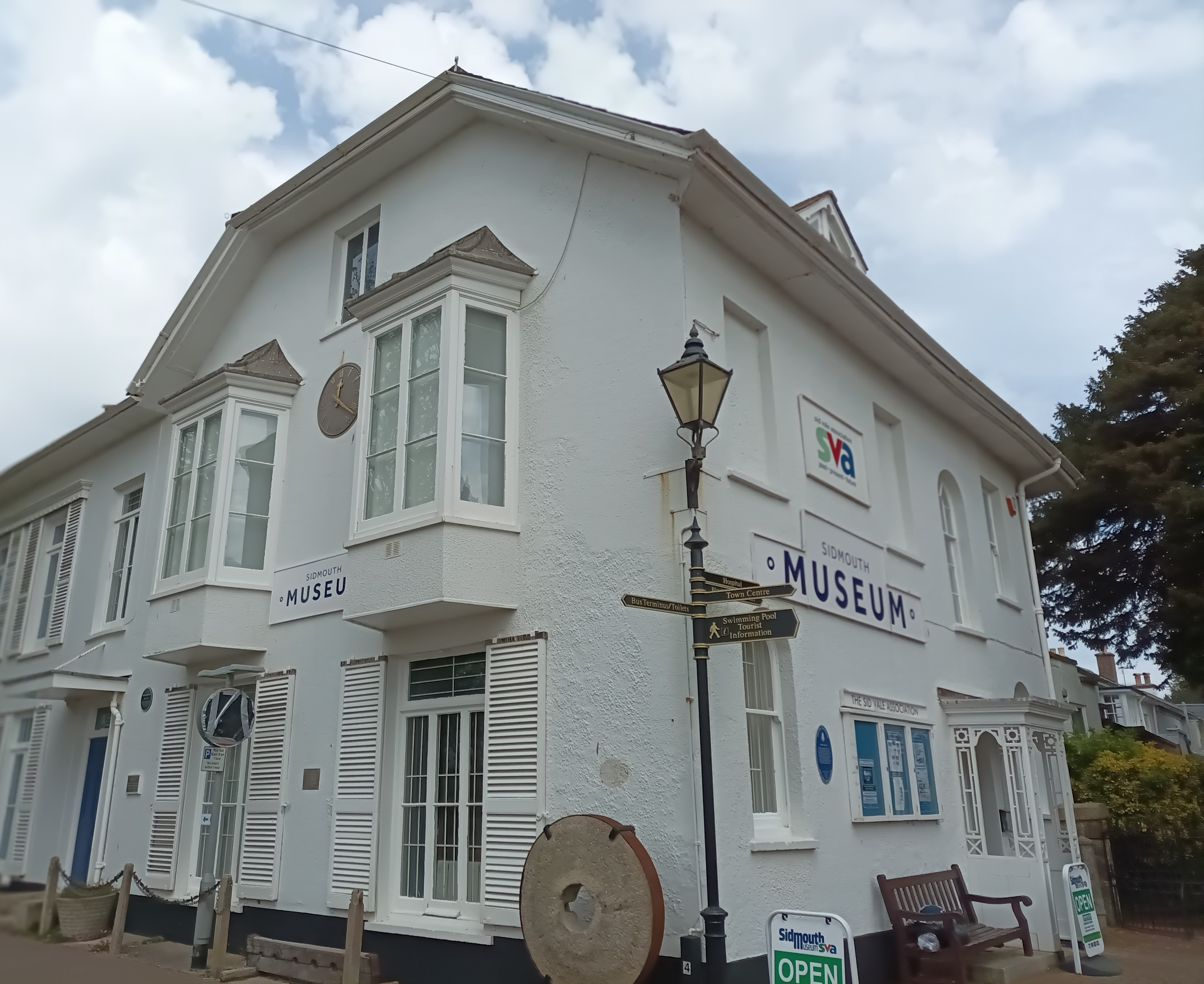
- Established: 1950; 76 years ago
- Location: Hope Cottage, Coburg Road, Sidmouth, England
- Coordinates: 50.6794°N 3.2398°W
- Visitors: Up to 15,000 annually
- Curator: Ann Tanner
- Website: www.sidmouthmuseum.co.uk

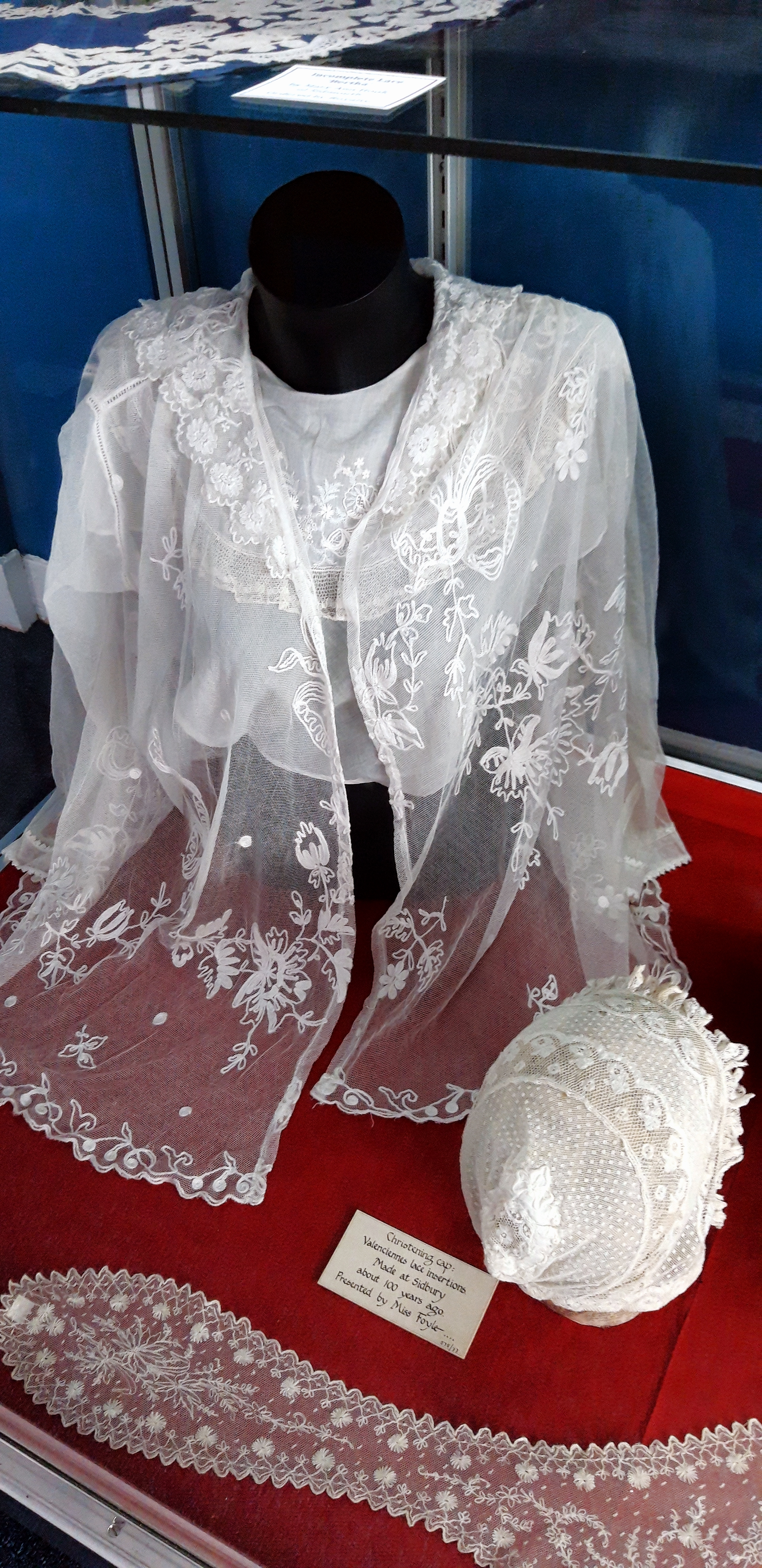
A 100-year-old lace christening cap and dress on display

Sidmouth Museum is a museum in Sidmouth, Devon, England.

The museum is housed in Hope Cottage, a Grade II listed building. The building was extended in 2020 to include more space for exhibits as well as new disabled access. In addition to exhibits relating to prominent local figures and history, it holds significant and diverse collections in areas such as lacemaking, local archaeology, and geology. It is owned by the Sid Vale Association (SVA).

== History ==
=== Establishment and early period ===
In 1950 Mary Kilgour invited the SVA to take over a collection of exhibits for which she had shared responsibility with Annie Leigh Browne and Lady Lockyer, wife of Sir Norman Lockyer.

Opening initially at Woolcombe House (now the town council premises), the SVA then moved the museum to its current premises in Hope Cottage in 1970. To this day, it is owned and funded by the SVA.

=== The museum today ===
Sidmouth Museum is run entirely by volunteers, most of whom are members of the SVA. It is a seasonal museum, closing for the winter months, during which most of the exhibits are replaced from the museum's considerable archives housed in the town. The museum operates a small shop, which sells the SVA's latest publications as well as Sidmouth-inspired souvenirs and trinkets.

The museum is open from 10 am to 4 pm every day except Saturday, when it closes at 1 pm. It is closed on Sundays. Admission is £2.50, except for SVA members and under 16s, for whom entry is free. Several times a year, the museum holds children's activities days. Children can also complete a quiz trail during their visit.

The museum runs guided geology and town walks through Sidmouth, led by local experts. The museum has committed to the digitisation of its holdings, much of which are too fragile to put on display to the wider public. A notable example of this digitisation effort was the scanning of Sidmouth Shingle, a 10-volume illustrated record of the Sidmouth's coastline, particularly its beaches, which totals over 4,000 pages.

== Collections ==
Though the collections change every year, the museum exhibits items in several areas, including but not limited to geology, lace, famous Sidmouthians (including Sir John Ambrose Fleming and Peter Orlando Hutchinson) as well as local history. The museum currently displays a collection of military medals and offers a display recalling Sidmouth during the Second World War. Before the 2021 season, the museum secured several digitisation grants, which provided the opportunity to present many of the museum's offerings in digital form. As a result, visitors can now access a great deal of information via screens and QR codes. Digitisation means that the museum can display much more in an electronic form than would be physically possible in a relatively small building. Almost the entirety of the museum's art collection, for instance, is accessible via interactive screens.

=== Reception room ===
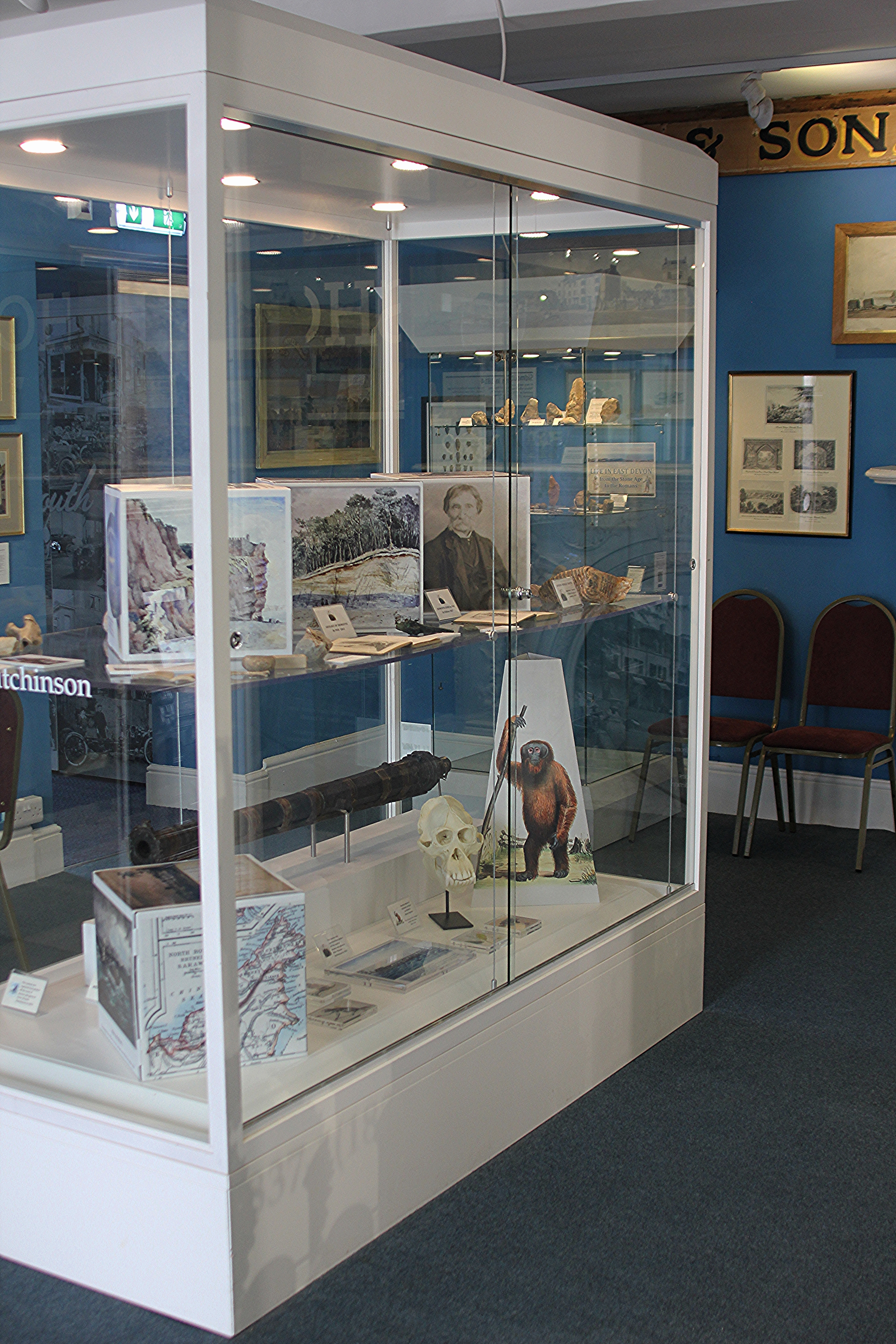
The Peter Orlando Hutchinson display case on the ground floor, housing a naval cannon which was gifted to Hutchinson after it was captured from Bornean pirates

The reception room contains a large roof-high cabinet displaying assorted coronation memorabilia from Queen Victoria to Elizabeth II. The children's area is also located here. In addition, there are exhibits on the last Lord of Sidmouth Manor, Colonel John Balfour, the life of Peter Orlando Hutchinson, fossils and archaeological items from the East Devon area in the 'Life in East Devon - Stone Age to the Romans' display.

=== Geology room ===
The geology room contains many rare reptile fossils and amphibian bones which have been found on Sidmouth's beaches, including the remains of the Rhynchosaur, a herbivore reptile. Graphic displays chart the history of Sidmouth's Jurassic Coast, a UNESCO World Heritage Site, through geological time. Other items on show include a megalodon tooth, belemnite guards and a selection of woolly mammoth teeth, the largest of which weighs 5.5 kg (12 lb).

=== Sidmouth 1942 ===
In 1942, Kennaway House became home to an RAF Regiment officer cadet training school, and later an aircrew school. The museum's 'Sidmouth 1942' display is based around this wartime role. It is home to the crest of HMS Sidmouth, a Bangor-class minesweeper, which took part in the Dieppe Raid and D-Day.

=== Military medals and coins display ===
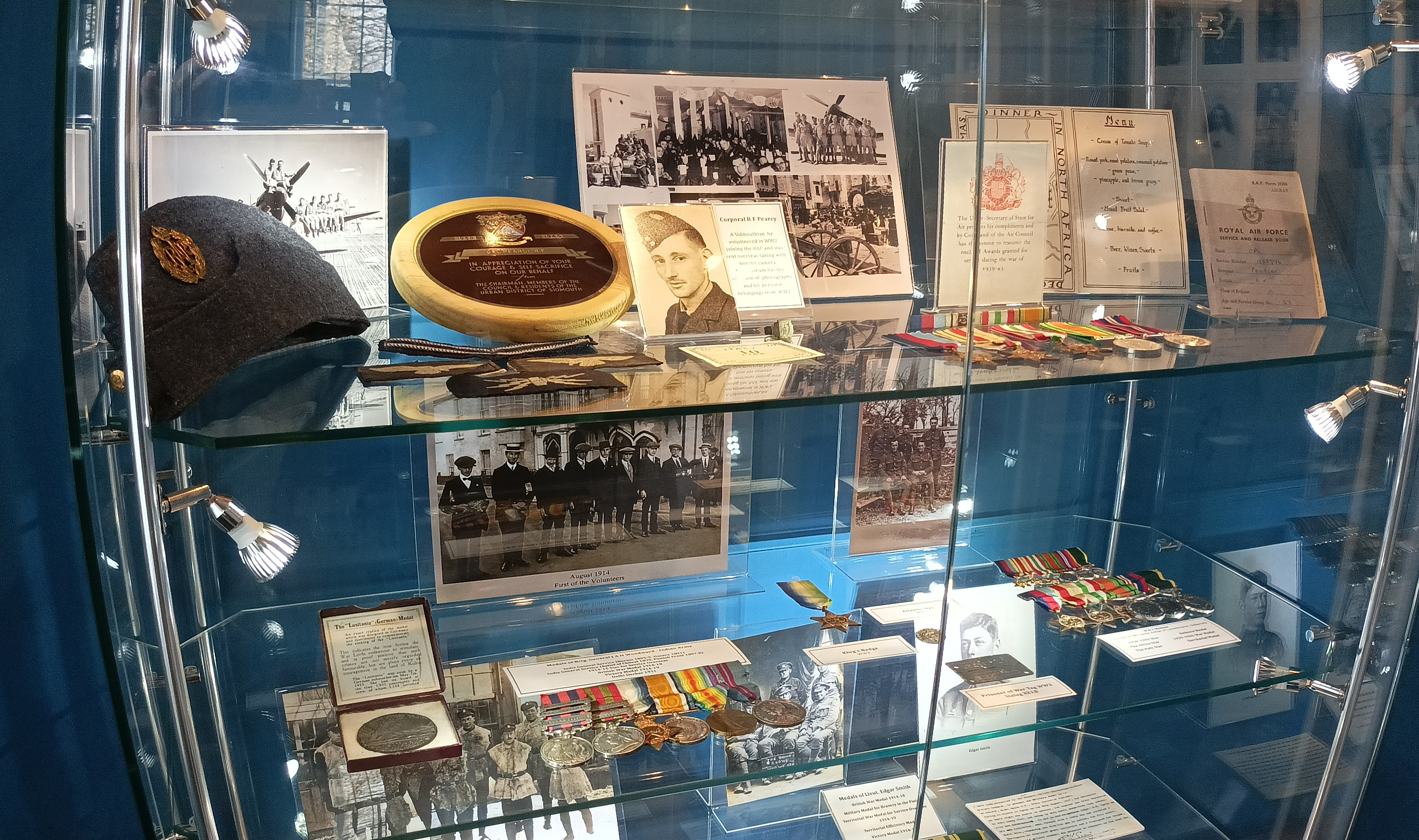
The 2022 medals display

In the 2022 season, the museum included a military medals display for the first time. The items on display range from coins commemorating the Duke of Wellington's victories, to medals awarded by the United Nations in the post-Second World War period. Many personal effects of the medal recipients were donated to the museum, a select few of which are also visible to the public. The medals of Lieutenant Edward Bailey, who was awarded the Military Medal for gallantry in the First World War, and Corporal R. F. Pearcey, who served as a Royal Air Force mechanic in North Africa and Italy during the Second World War, are present alongside their personal items.

=== Main room ===
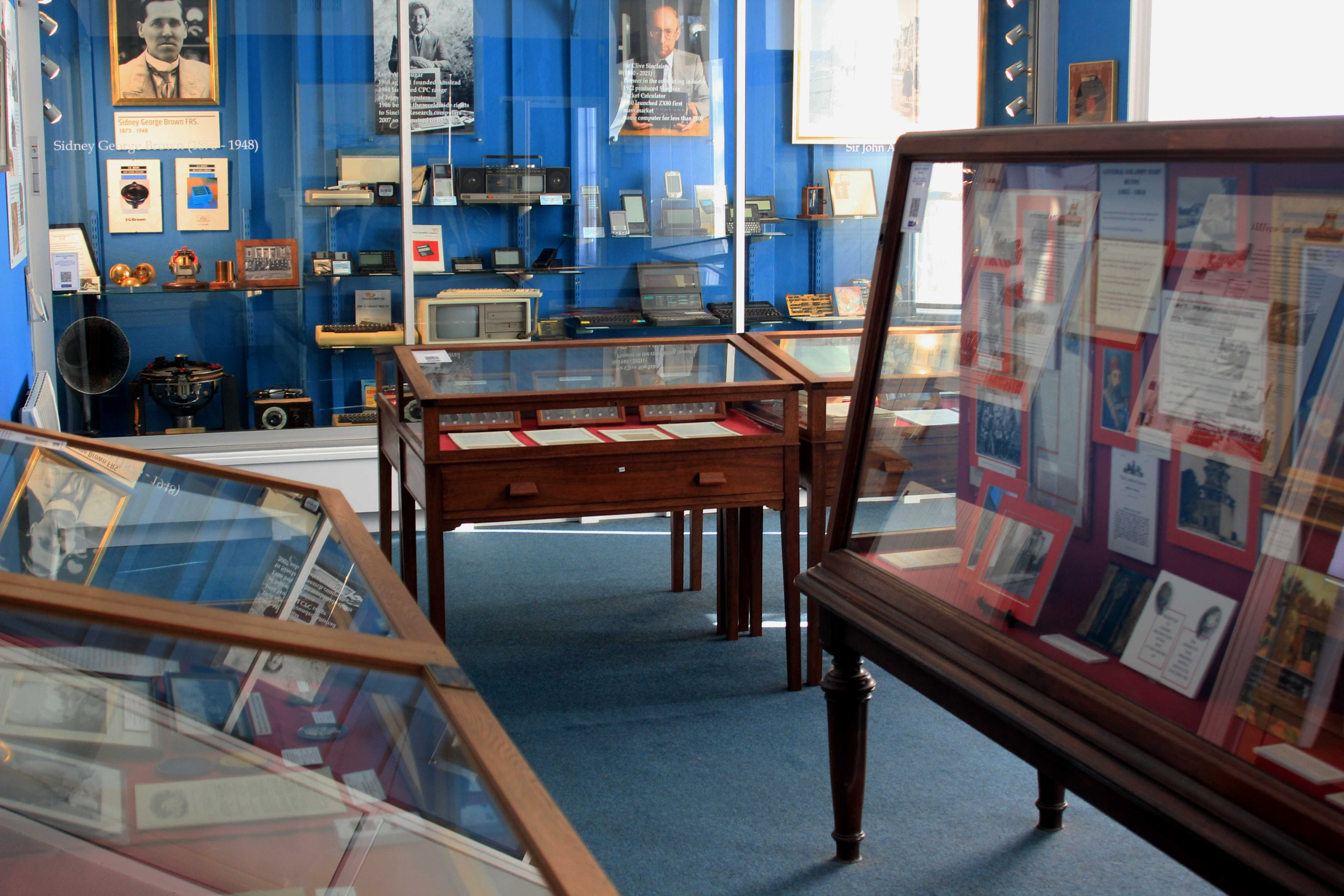
The main room

The main room takes on a scientific and technological flavour. In 2021, a significant donation of 1970s-1990s computer technology was made to the museum, which is now on display. The scientists Sidney Brown, Frederick Lindemann and Sir Norman Lockyer are remembered here, with Lockyer's display including his Knight Commander of the Order of the Bath star. These displays are in addition to a display cabinet covering the history of the museum, and an additional cabinet holding coronation memorabilia.

=== Lace room ===
Sidmouth Museum holds considerable quantities of lace in its collection, though only a small fraction of this can be displayed physically in the building itself. A digital monitor allows visitors to view other examples of lace not on public display at the museum. The room also hosts the original Long Picture, a panorama of Sidmouth seafront painted by Hubert Cornish in 1814.

The Long Picture

=== Archaeology room ===
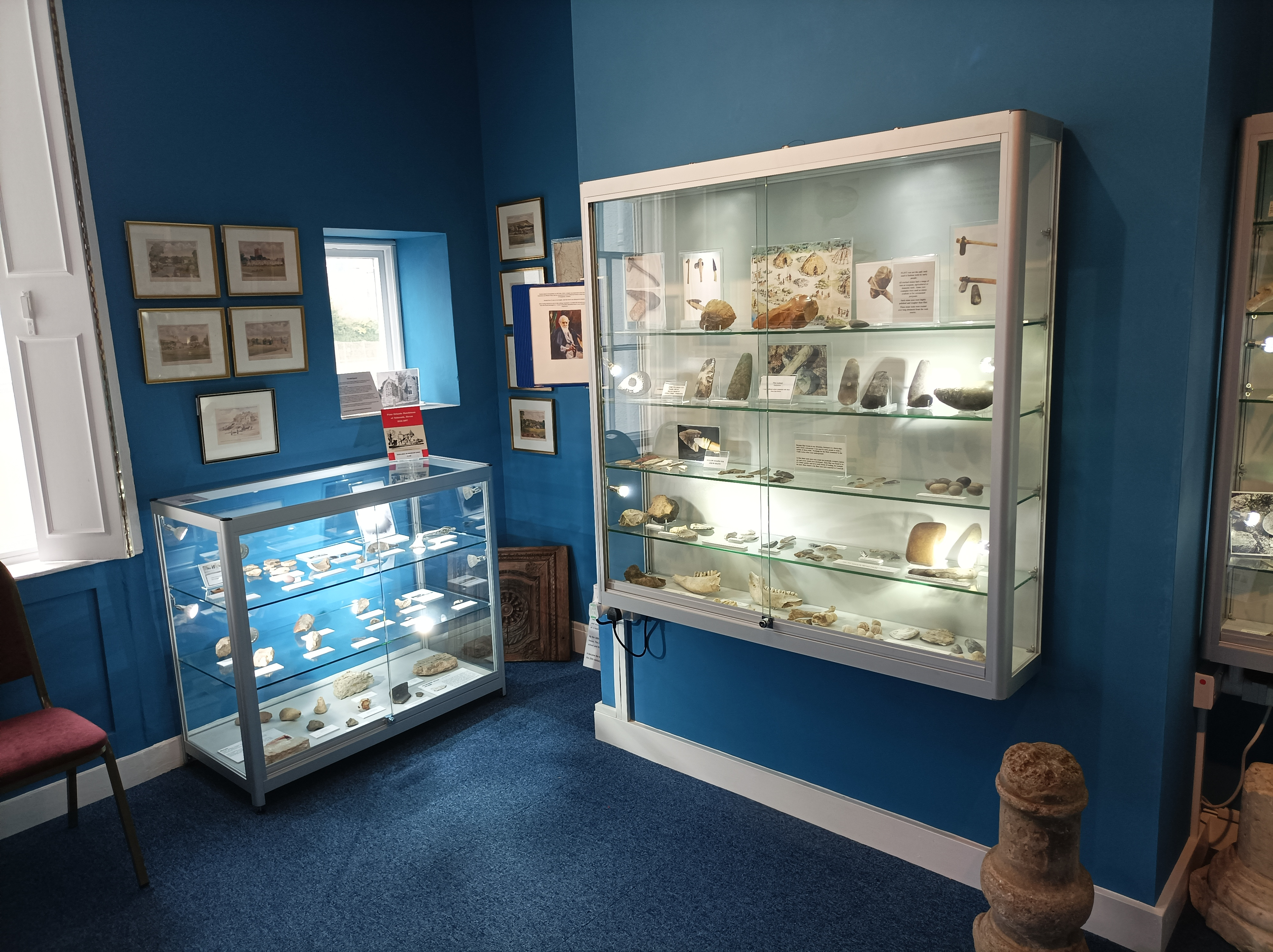
The archaeology room

The archaeology room contains ancient Roman pottery and animal bones, as well as Stone Age flint tools such as axe heads, scrapers and knives. In addition, visitors can view some of Sir Norman Lockyer's collection of Ancient Egyptian artefacts, donated to him by Sir Flinders Petrie, the father of modern scientific archaeology. Ushabti dolls and beads from the time of Tutankhamun form the centrepieces of this collection.
