= Vaughan (disambiguation) =

Vaughan is a city in Ontario, Canada.

Vaughan may also refer to:

== Name ==
- Vaughan (given name), list of people with this given name
- Vaughan (surname), list of people with this surname

== Other places ==
=== Australia ===
- Vaughan, Victoria

=== Canada ===
- Vaughan, Nova Scotia
- Vaughan Road, in Toronto, Ontario
- Vaughan Metropolitan Centre station
- Vaughan (federal electoral district), in Ontario

=== United States ===
- Vaughan, Mississippi
- Vaughan, North Carolina
- Vaughan, Texas
- Vaughan, West Virginia

== Other uses ==
- Vaughan's identity, a mathematical concept
- Vaughan & Bushnell Manufacturing, an American maker of striking tools
- Mount Vaughan, a mountain in Antarctica
- Vaughan Building, a building of Somerville College, Oxford

== See also ==
- Vaughn (disambiguation)
- Vawn, Saskatchewan
- Von (disambiguation)
