= Vaughan Cornish =

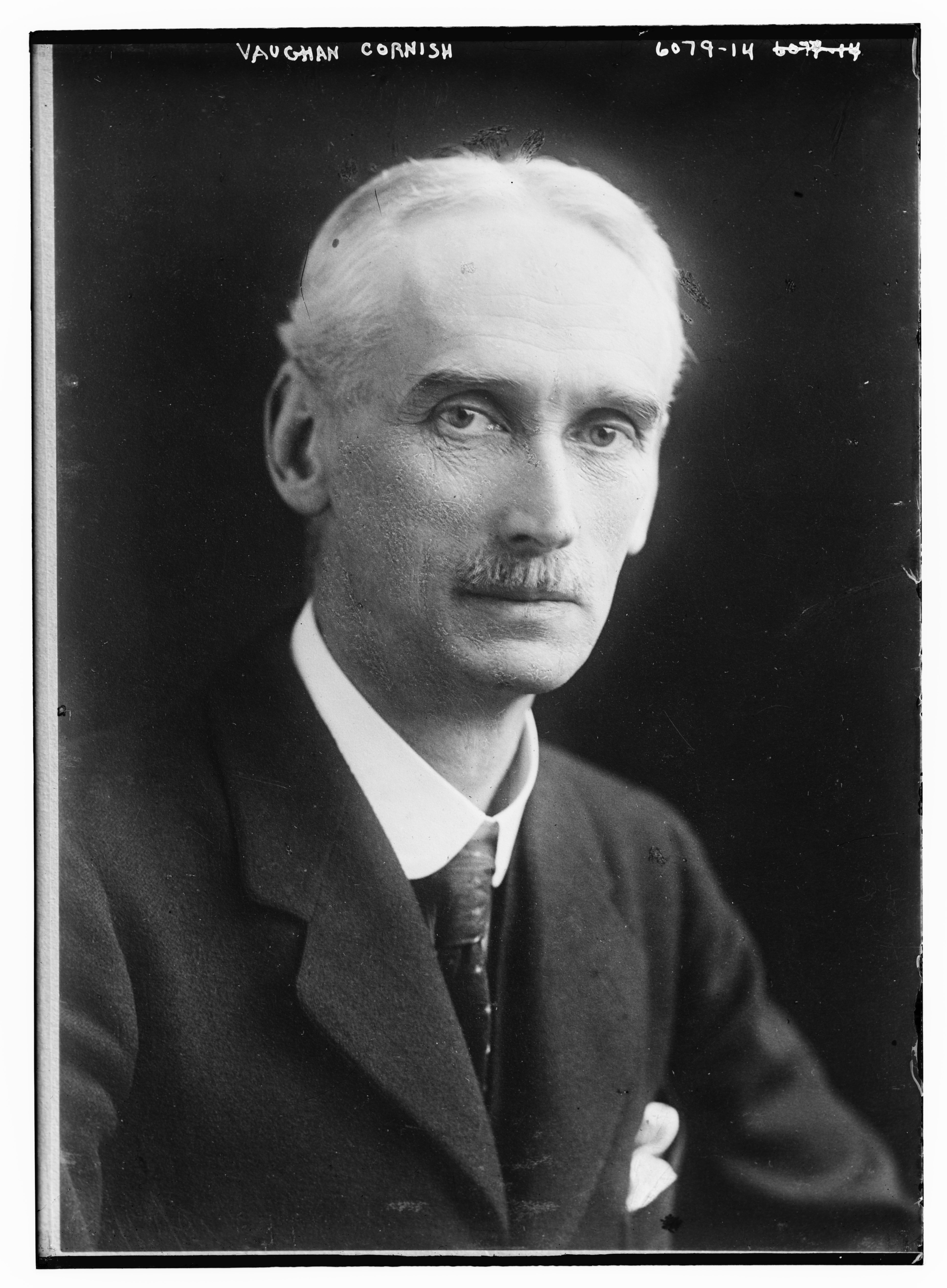
- Born: 22 December 1862; Debenham, Suffolk, England
- Died: 1 May 1948 (aged 85); Camberley, Surrey, England
- Occupation: Geographer

Vaughan Cornish FRGS FGS (22 December 1862 – 1 May 1948) was an English geographer.

== Early life and education ==
He was the son of the vicar of Debenham, Charles John Cornish (1834–1913) and Anne Charlotte Cornish (1831–1887). His brother was Charles John Cornish.

Cornish was educated at home before attending St Paul's School, London, when he was 17. He studied chemistry at the Victoria University of Manchester, graduating with a first class BSc (1888). He then gained a MSc (1892) and a DSc (1901).

== Career ==
Cornish visited the building of the Panama Canal in 1907, documented in his The Panama Canal and its Makers (1909). He visited the site again in 1910. He was interested in the strategy and political geography of the British Empire, hoping that British emigration to the Empire would promote the future interests of the "white races".

In 1906 he was elected as an honorary member of the Yorkshire Philosophical Society. In 1928–29, he served as the president of the Geographical Association in the UK.

His later works were focussed on the geography and legends of the British Isles, which he often approached in a fearlessly original manner. In his 1941 survey of historic thorn trees, he suggested that the winter-flowering Glastonbury Thorn, which he thought might have functioned as the meeting-point for the hundred of Glaston Twelve Hides, might have been planted by the monks of Glastonbury to lure local pagans away from the lustful associations of more ordinary hawthorns, which flowered in May when human sap ran high; it was, he claimed, 'a remarkable combination of nature knowledge with tactful piety'.

== Works ==
- The Panama Canal and its Makers (1909)
- Waves of the Sea and other Water Waves (1910)
- The Travels of Ellen Cornish: being the Memoir of a Pilgrim of Science (1913)
- The Waves of Sand and Snow (1914)
- Naval and Military Geography (1916)
- Imperial Military Geography (1920)
- A Geography of Imperial Defence (1922)
- The Great Capitals (1923)
- National Parks and the Heritage of Scenery (1930)
- The Poetic Impression of Natural Scenery (1931)
- The Scenery of England (1932)
- Borderlands of Language in Europe (1933)
- Ocean Waves and Kindred Geophysical Phenomena (1934)
- Scenery and the Sense of Sight (1935)
- The Preservation of our Scenery (1937)
- The Farm upon the Cliff (1939)
- The Scenery of Sidmouth (1940)
- Historic Thorn Trees in the British Isles (1941)
- A Family of Devon (1942)
- The Beauties of Scenery (1943)
- The Photography of Scenery (1946)
- Geographical Essays (1946)
- The Churchyard Yew and Immortality (1946)
- Kestell, Clapp and Cornish (1947)
- Sketches of Scenery in England and Abroad (1949)
