= Jurassic Coast =

World Heritage Site on the coast of southern England

Dorset and East Devon Coast
UNESCO World Heritage Site
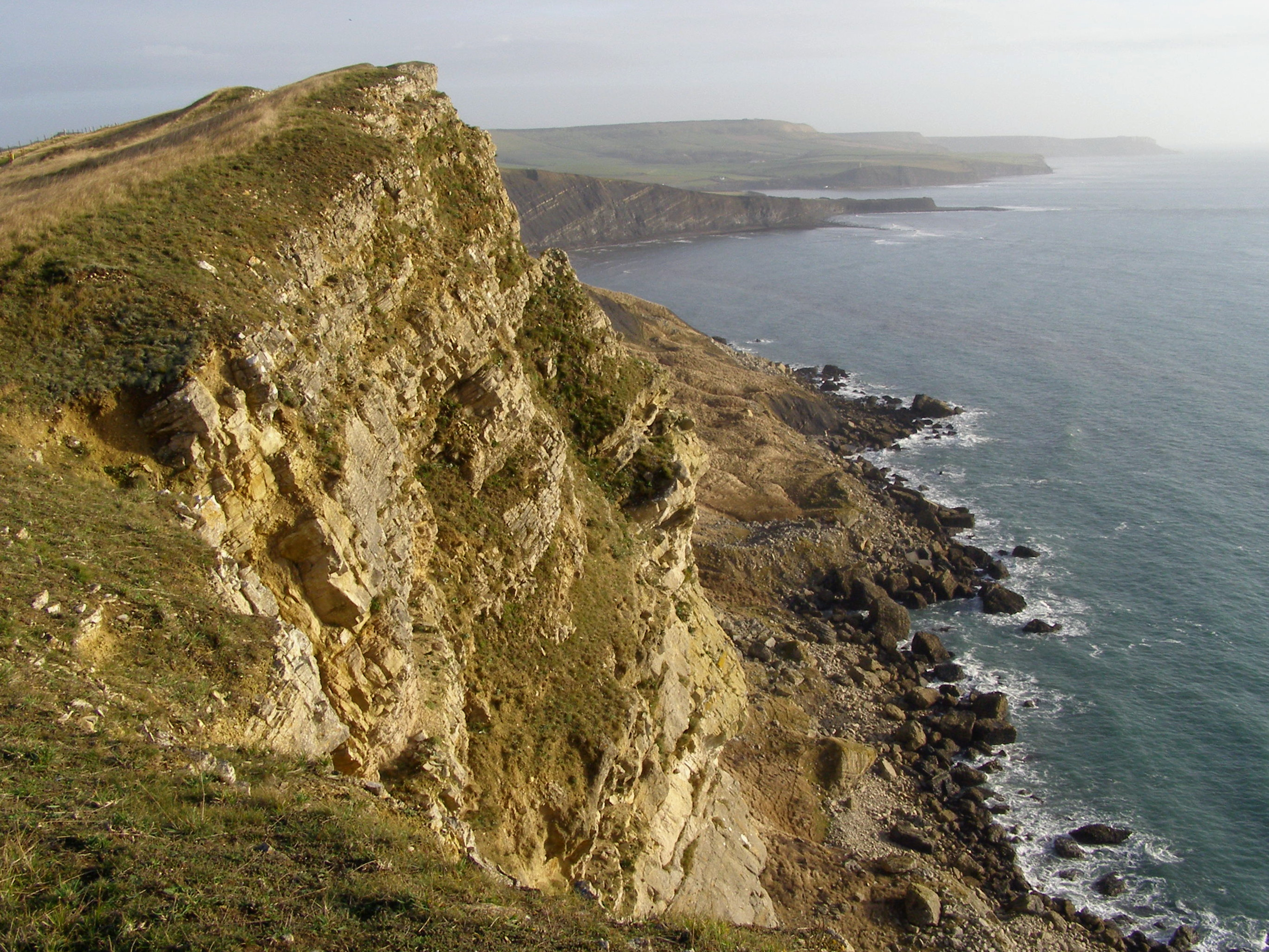
- Gad Cliff to St Alban's Head

- Location within England
- Location: United Kingdom
- Criteria: Natural: viii
- Reference: 1029
- Inscription: 2001 (25th Session)
- Website: Official website
- Coordinates: 50°42′20″N 2°59′24″W

The Jurassic Coast, also known as the Dorset and East Devon Coast, is a World Heritage Site on the English Channel coast of southern England. It stretches from Exmouth in East Devon to Studland Bay in Dorset, a distance of about 96 miles (154 km), and was inscribed on the World Heritage List in mid-December 2001.

The site spans 185 million years of geological history, coastal erosion having exposed an almost continuous sequence of rock formation covering the Triassic, Jurassic and Cretaceous periods. At different times, this area has been desert, shallow tropical sea and marsh, and the fossilised remains of the various creatures that lived there have been preserved in the rocks.

Natural features seen on this stretch of coast include arches, pinnacles and stack rocks. In some places, the sea has broken through resistant rocks to produce coves with restricted entrances and, in one place, the Isle of Portland is connected to the land by a barrier beach. In some parts of the coast, landslides are common. These have exposed a wide range of fossils, the different rock types each having its own typical fauna and flora, thus providing evidence of how animals and plants evolved in this region.

The area around Lulworth Cove contains a fossil forest, and 71 different rock strata have been identified at Lyme Regis, each with its own species of ammonite. The fossil collector Mary Anning lived here and her major discoveries of marine reptiles and other fossils were made at a time when the study of palaeontology was just starting to develop. The Charmouth Heritage Coast Centre provides information on the heritage coast, and the whole length of the site can be visited via the South West Coast Path.

== World Heritage Site ==
The Jurassic Coast stretches from Orcombe Point near Exmouth in East Devon to Old Harry Rocks near Swanage in East Dorset, a distance of 96 miles (154 km). Inscribed on the World Heritage List in 2001, the Jurassic Coast was the first wholly natural World Heritage Site to be designated in the United Kingdom. At Orcombe Point, the "Geoneedle" (2002), an acute pyramidal sculpture, marks the western end of the heritage site; this is built out of fragments of the different types of rocks to be seen along the coast.

The UNESCO World Heritage Committee nomination document lists eight segments of coast included in the site. The segments are:

- from Orcombe Rocks to Chit Rocks, Sidmouth
- from River Sid, Sidmouth to Seaton Hole
- the Axmouth to Lyme Regis Undercliff, from the mouth of the River Axe to The Cobb in Lyme Regis
- from Lyme Regis to West Bay
- Chesil Beach, the Fleet Lagoon and the Isle of Portland Coast
- Portland Harbour Shore
- from Bowleaze Cove to Peveril Point
- from New Swanage to Studland Bay

The cliffs on this part of the coast are being eroded as sections crumble away and landslides occur. These processes reveal successive layers of sedimentary rock, uncovering the geological history at the modern coastline over a period of 185 million years, and disclosing an almost continuous sequence of rock formations covering the Triassic, Jurassic and Cretaceous periods. The fossils found in the area and the coastal geomorphologic features of this dynamic coast have advanced the study of earth sciences for more than two hundred years. The area covered by the designation comprises the land between the mean low water mark and the top of the cliffs or the back of the beach.

The fossils found in abundance along this coastline provide evidence of how animals and plants evolved in this region. During the Triassic this area was a desert, while in the Jurassic it was part of a tropical sea, and in the Cretaceous it was covered by swamps. The fossilised remains of the animals and plants that lived in those periods are very well preserved, providing a wealth of information on their body shapes, the way they died and even the fossilised remains of their last meals. Fossil groups found here include crustaceans, insects, molluscs, echinoderms, fish, amphibians, reptiles and a few mammals. At Lulworth Cove there is a fossil forest of conifers, tree-ferns and cycads.

== Geography ==
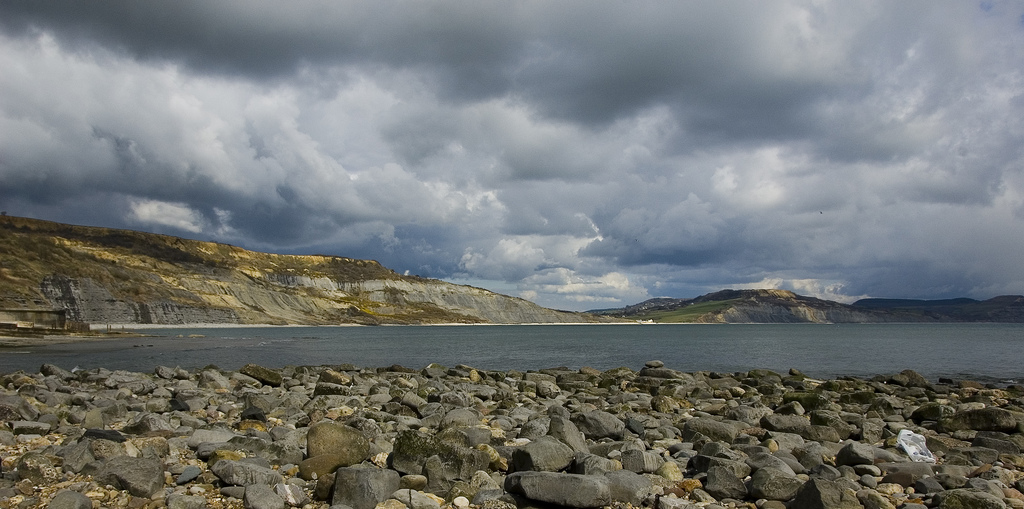
Lyme Bay

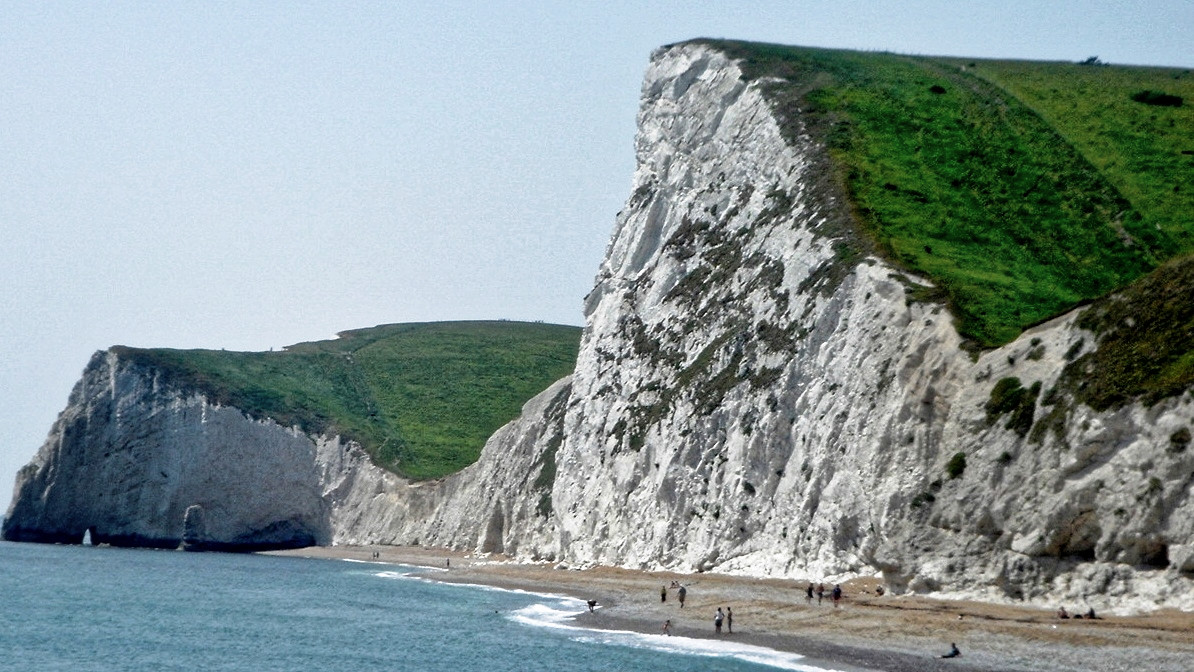
Coastal rock on the Jurassic Coast

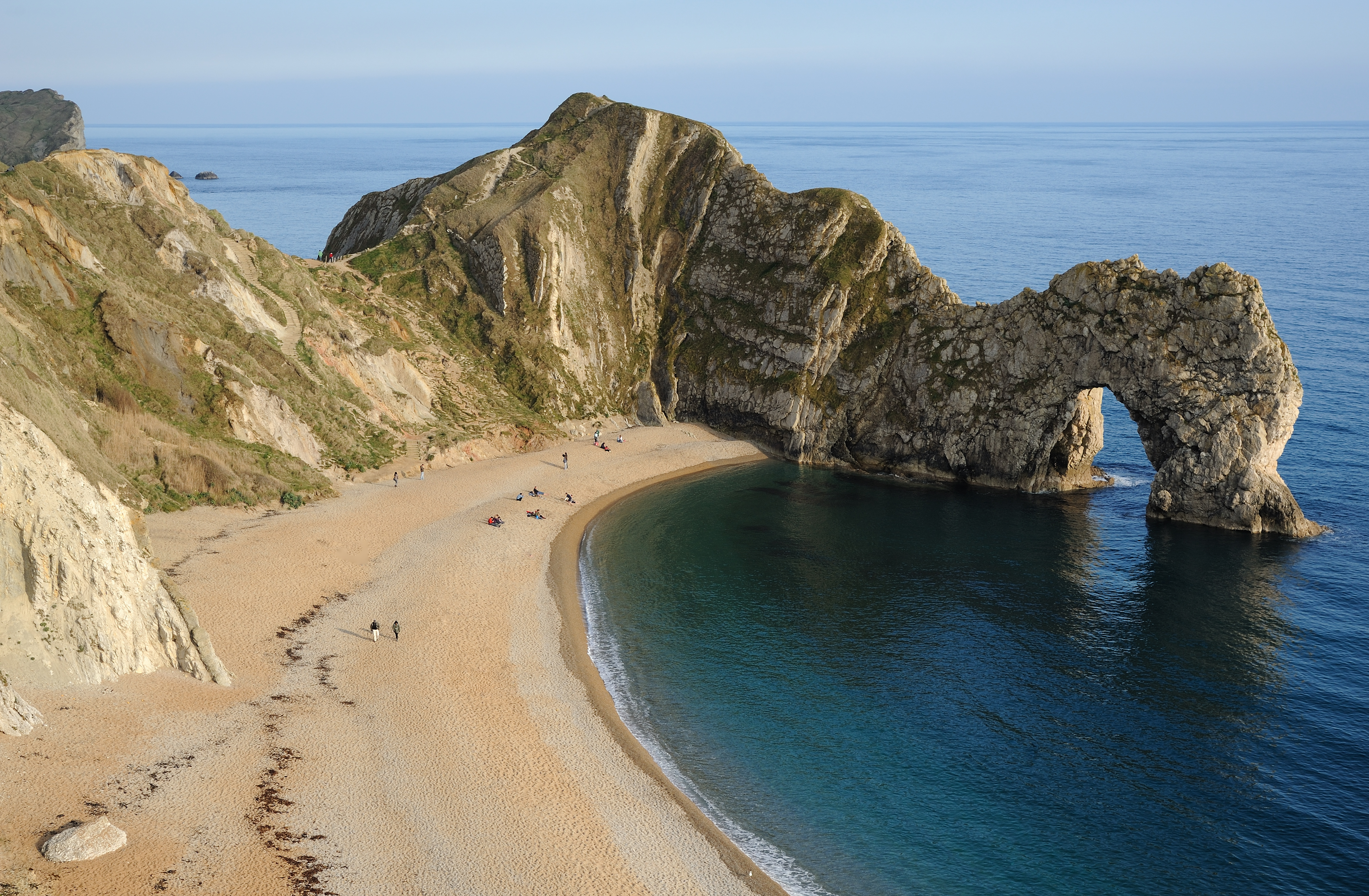
Durdle Door

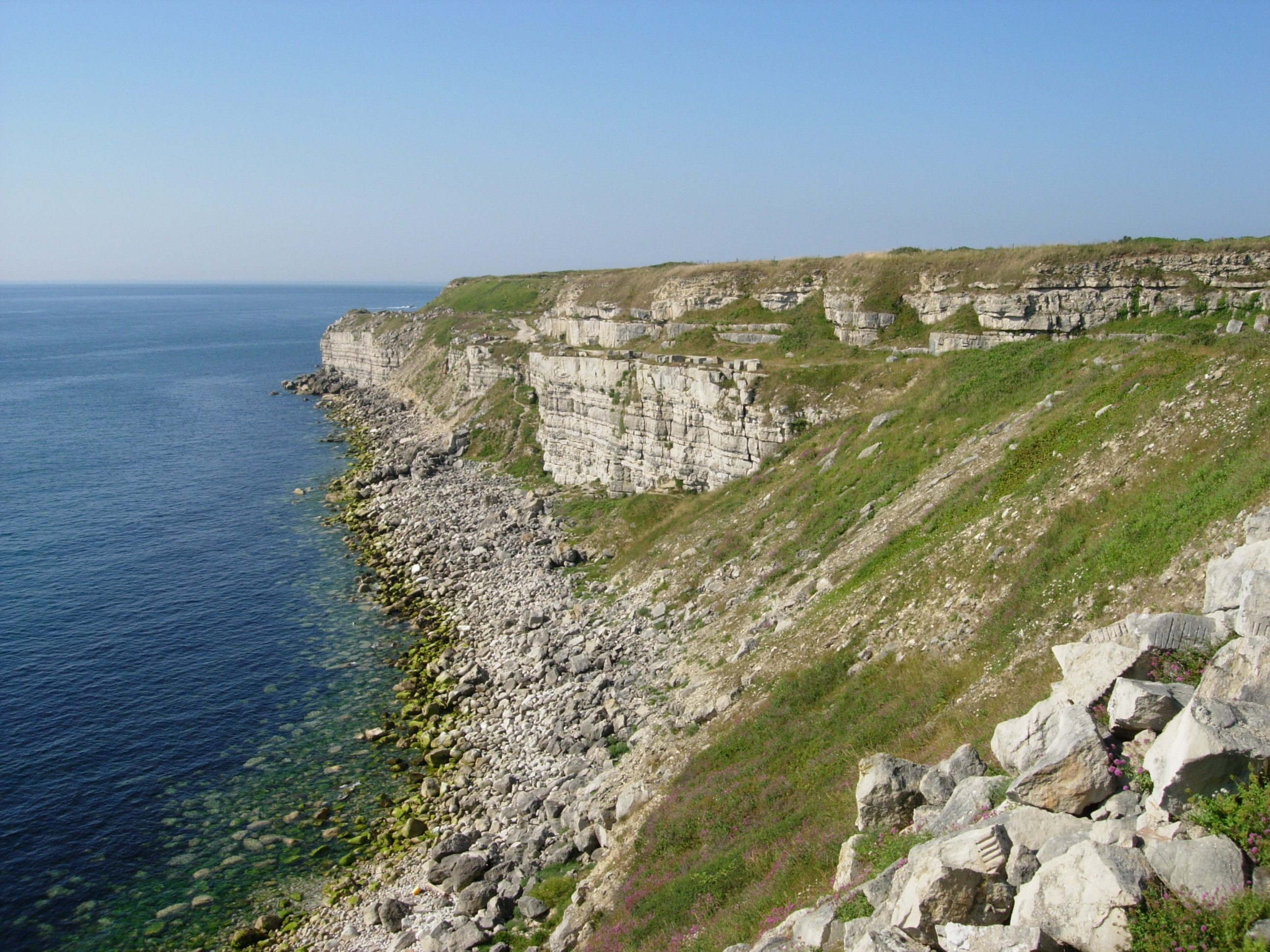
The Jurassic limestones on the Isle of Portland have been extensively quarried.

The Jurassic Coast consists of Triassic, Jurassic and Cretaceous cliffs, spanning the Mesozoic, documenting 185 million years of geological history. The site can be best viewed from the sea, when the dipping nature of the rock strata becomes apparent.

In East Devon the steep coastal cliffs consist of red sandstone from the Triassic; at Budleigh Salterton the gravel cliffs contain red quartzite pebbles which accumulate on the beach below as Budleigh pebbles, which are locally protected. Further east at Ladram Bay, more sandstone cliffs give rise to spectacular red sandstone stacks.

Around Lyme Regis and Charmouth the cliffs are of Jurassic clays and shale, and landslips are common. Chesil Beach is a good example of a barrier beach and stretches for 18 miles (29 km) from Burton Bradstock to the Isle of Portland. The beach encloses an intertidal lagoon which is an internationally important Ramsar Convention site known for its biodiversity.

At Lulworth Cove, the waves have cut their way through the resistant Portland stone and created a horseshoe-shaped cove by eroding the softer sands and clays behind. Another feature of this part of the coast is Durdle Door, a natural arch. Sea stacks and pinnacles, such as Old Harry Rocks at Handfast Point, have been formed by erosion of the chalk cliffs.

The highest point on the Jurassic Coast, and on the entire south coast of Britain, is Golden Cap at 627 ft (191 m) between Bridport and Charmouth.

This coast shows excellent examples of landforms, including the natural arch at Durdle Door, the cove and limestone folding at Lulworth Cove, and a tied island, the Isle of Portland. Chesil Beach is a fine example of both a tombolo (a deposition landform in which an island is attached to the mainland by a narrow piece of land such as a spit or bar) and a storm beach (a beach affected by particularly fierce waves). The site has stretches of both concordant and discordant coastlines. Due to the quality of the varied geology, the site is the subject of international field studies.

The many sedimentary layers on this coastline are rich with fossils, the remains of the animals and plants present in the area whose tissues became immersed in deposits of mud which later hardened into rock. At Lyme Regis, for example, geologists have identified 71 layers of rock, each one containing fossils of a different species of ammonite.

== History ==
At the end of the 18th century Georges Cuvier showed that some fossil animals resembled no living ones, thus demonstrating that animals could become extinct; this led to the emergence of palaeontology, the study of fossils. The coasts of eastern Devon and western Dorset were rich in fossil beds, but before this time the fossils had merely been gathered as a pastime or collected by local residents and sold to visitors as curios.

Mary Anning (1799–1847) lived in Lyme Regis and followed in her father's footsteps as a collector. She became an expert on the fossils to be found in the Blue Lias around the town and discovered the first complete Ichthyosaur skeleton at The Spittles. Other important discoveries of ichthyosaurs, plesiosaurs and a pterosaur followed, as well as invertebrates such as cephalopods and their ink sacs.

During World War II several sections of the Jurassic Coast became the property of the Ministry of War. One of the Royal Navy's largest bases was at Portland Harbour, though it has since closed. A major army base at Bovington remains in use today. Large areas of land, including the coast between Lulworth Cove and Kimmeridge, are still only partially accessible; this includes the ghost village of Tyneham which was evacuated after being requisitioned by the army in 1943.

Areas of the coast near Exmouth, The Fleet Lagoon at Weymouth and the beaches at Studland have also been used for military training but have since been returned to civilian use.

Parts of the coast, especially around Portland, can be dangerous, and shipwrecks have been a feature of the coast. In January 2007 the coast experienced its most environmentally damaging wreck when the MSC Napoli, a 2,400 capacity container ship, was beached at Branscombe near Sidmouth, losing oil and cargo.

== Management and access ==
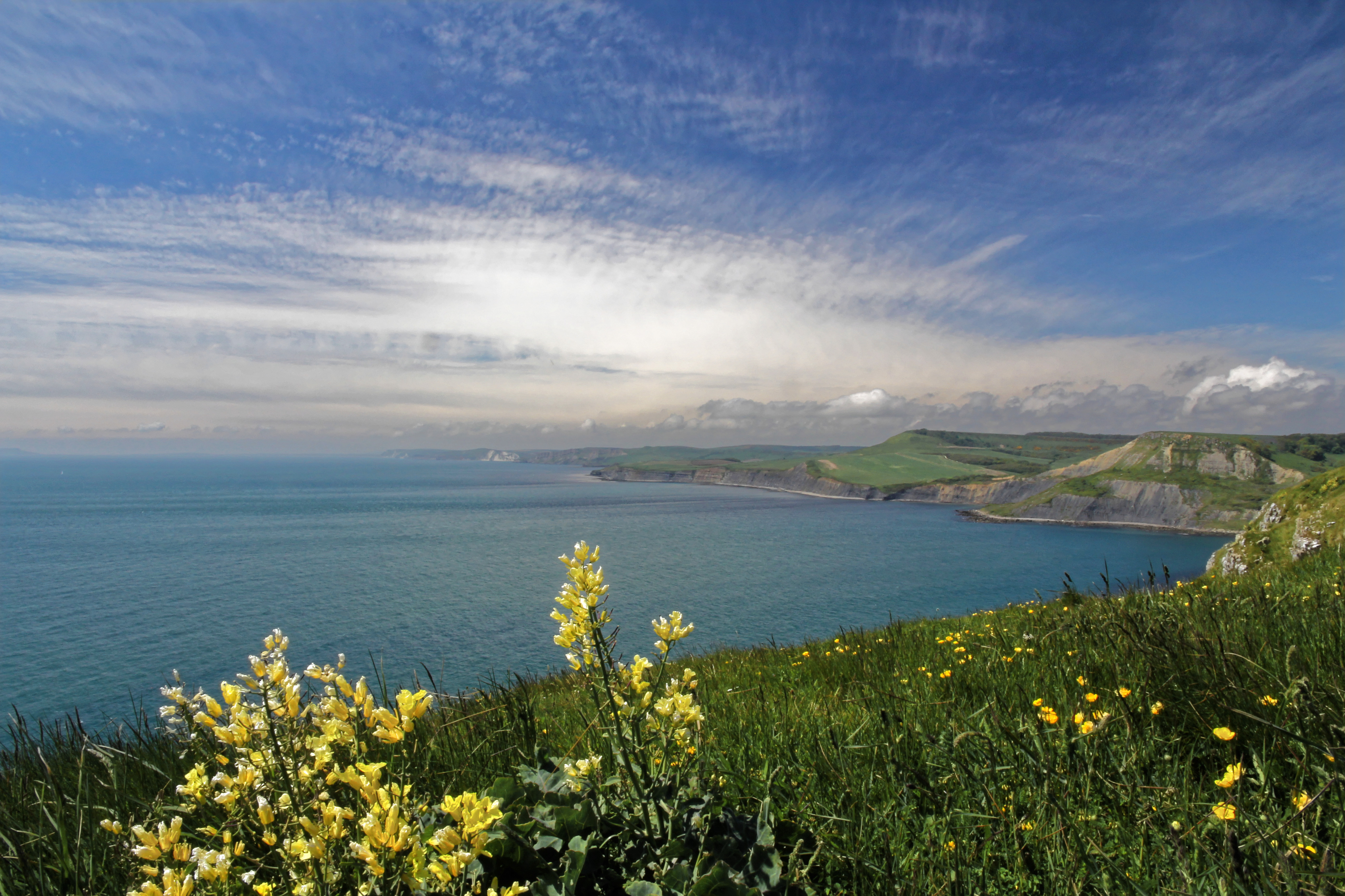
The Jurassic Coast west of St Aldhelm's Head

The Jurassic Coast is subject to severe weather conditions at times. Violent storms occurred in 1824 and 1974, and these and various lesser storms have battered the cliffs and caused flooding and structural damage in coastal towns. The coast is largely an eroding landscape and management of the site aims to allow the natural processes of erosion to continue while protecting people and property. Coastal defences have been put in place in Charmouth and Weymouth, where houses are at risk, but in other places, where the coastline remains in a natural state, the management policy is to take no action and allow erosion to take its course.

The Charmouth Heritage Coast Centre is an independent educational charity situated near the beach in Charmouth; it provides information and displays on the geology of the area and the wildlife, including a large collection of fossils and a rockpool aquarium. Family fossil-hunting trips are organised from here as well as other events and activities related to the geology and natural history of the area.

The entire length of the coast can be walked on the South West Coast Path. Landslips and rockfalls are a continuing feature of the evolution of this coast. On 6 May 2008, a 1,300 ft (400 m) section of the coast was dramatically re-shaped after a landslip that was described as the worst in 100 years. There was a fatality in 2012 when 400 tonnes (390 long tons) of rock fell onto the beach at Burton Bradstock and another cliff fall took place in 2016 at West Bay, near Bridport. There was a further cliff collapse at Hive Beach near the village of Burton Bradstock shortly before dawn on 29 August 2020 after prolonged rainfall. The public were warned to stay clear of the unstable rocks. On 15 April 2021, a further collapse occurred. The collapse was described as being the biggest UK rockfall in 60 years.

== See also ==
- Full list of places on the Jurassic Coast
