= Vaughan (given name) =

Vaughan (or Vaughn) is a surname, originally Welsh, deriving from the Welsh word bychan, meaning "small". It is also used as a first name - mainly for men, and occasionally for women. Notable people with this given name include:

- Vaughan Arnell (born 1961), British music video director
- Vaughan Bowen (born 1972), Australian business executive
- Vaughan Brown (born 1959), New Zealand cricketer
- Vaughan Connelly (1902–1991), American gridiron football player
- Vaughan Cornish (1862–1948), English geographer
- Vaughan Coveny (born 1971), New Zealand association footballer
- Vaughan Cox (1860–1923), British general in the Indian Army
- Vaughan Ellis (born 1947), Australian rules footballer
- Vaughan Gething (born 1974), Welsh politician
- Vaughan Glaser (1872–1958), American actor
- Vaughan Grayson (1894–1995), Canadian painter and writer
- Vaughan Grylls (born 1943), British conceptual artist and photographer
- Vaughan Harley (1864–1923), British professor
- Vaughan Johnson (1962–2019), American football player
- Vaughan Johnson (politician) (1947–2023), Australian politician
- Vaughan Jones (born 1952–2020), New Zealand mathematician
- Vaughan Jones (footballer) (born 1959), Welsh footballer
- Vaughan Kester (1869–1911), American novelist and journalist
- Vaughan Lee (fighter) (born 1982), English mixed martial artist
- Vaughan Lewis (born 1940), Saint Lucian politician
- Vaughan Lowe (born 1952), English judge and legal scholar
- Vaughan Oliver (1957–2019), British graphic designer
- Vaughan Pratt (born 1944), Australian-American computer scientist
- Vaughan Roberts (born 1965), English Anglican priest
- Vaughan Roderick (born 1957), Welsh television journalist
- Vaughan Russell (1890–1979), Scottish footballer
- Vaughan Ryan (born 1968), English footballer
- Vaughan Savidge (born 1956), British radio announcer and newsreader
- Vaughan Smith (born 1963), English war correspondent and restaurateur
- Vaughan Smith (entertainer) (born 1982), New Zealand radio presenter
- Vaughan Somers (born 1951), Australian golfer
- Vaughan Thomas (rugby league) (born 1945), English rugby league footballer
- Vaughan Vaughan-Lee (1836–1882), English politician
- Vaughan Wilkins (1890–1959), English historical novelist

== See also ==
- Vaughan (disambiguation)
- J. Vaughan Gary, American politician
- Ralph Vaughan Williams, English composer (note: given name is Ralph, surname is Vaughan Williams)
