= Charles John Cornish =

English naturalist and author

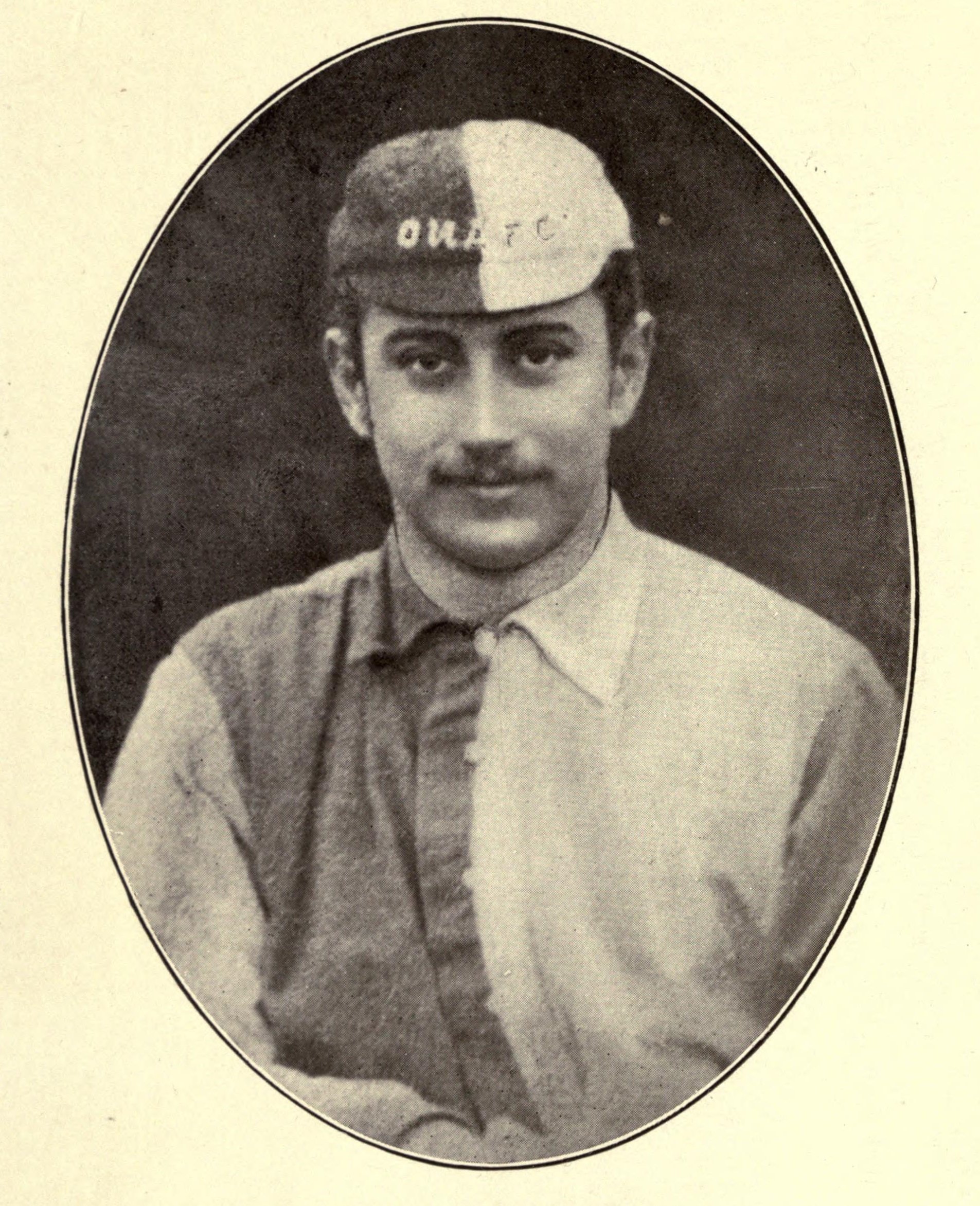

Charles John Cornish (28 September 1858 – 30 January 1906) was an English naturalist and writer.

== Life ==
Born on 28 September 1858 at Salcombe House, near Sidmouth, the residence of his grandfather, Charles John Cornish, J.P., D.L., was eldest son of Charles John Cornish, then curate of Sidbury, Devon, by his first wife, Anne Charlotte Western (died 1887). He was brought up at Debenham, Suffolk, where his father became vicar in 1859. In 1872 he entered Charterhouse School as a gown-boy, and left in 1876. After time as a private tutor, he entered Hertford College, Oxford, as a commoner in 1881, was elected Brunsell exhibitioner in 1882 and Lusby scholar in 1883. In the same year he obtained a blue in association football, a second class in classical moderations in 1883, and a second class in literae humaniores in 1885.

In 1885, Cornish was appointed assistant classical master at St Paul's School, London, a position he held for the rest of his life. Soon after coming to London he began to write articles on natural history and country life, and in 1890 became a regular contributor to The Spectator, and later to Country Life.

Cornish lived at Orford House, Chiswick Mall, beside the river Thames, when he wrote The Naturalist on the Thames in 1902.

Cornish died at Worthing on 30 January 1906, the cause originating in a shooting accident many years before. After cremation his ashes were interred at Salcombe Regis, near Sidmouth, and a mural tablet to his memory was placed in the parish church.

== Works ==
Many of Cornish's articles re-appeared in book form. He wrote:

- The New Forest, 1894.
- The Isle of Wight, 1895.
- Life at the Zoo, A work which made him widely known,1895
- Wild England of To-day, and the Wild Life in it, 1895.
- Animals at Work and Play, 1896. 2nd edition, 1897
- Nights with an Old Gunner, 1897.
- Animals of To-day, their Life and Conservation. London: Seeley and Co. 1898. OCLC 919880 (all editions).
- The Naturalist on the Thames, 1902.
- Sir William Henry Flower, a Personal Memoir, 1904.

He collaborated with others in Living Animals of the World (2 vols. 1901-2). Animal Artisans and other Studies of Birds and Beasts, with a memoir by his widow, was published in 1907.

== Family ==
Cornish married in 1893 Edith, eldest daughter of John Isaac Thornycroft, by whom he had one daughter.

== Notes ==
Attribution

This article incorporates text from a publication now in the public domain: Lee, Sidney, ed. (1912). "Cornish, Charles John". Dictionary of National Biography (2nd supplement). Vol. 1. London: Smith, Elder & Co.
