= Sidford =

Village in Devon, England

Coordinates: 50.70346°N 3.22774°W

- Location within Devon
- OS grid reference: SY135902
- District: East Devon
- Shire county: Devon
- Region: South West
- Country: England
- Sovereign state: United Kingdom
- Post town: SIDMOUTH
- Postcode district: EX10
- Police: Devon and Cornwall
- Fire: Devon and Somerset
- Ambulance: South Western
- UK Parliament: Honiton and Sidmouth

Sidford is a small village in the civil parish of and on the outskirts of the town of Sidmouth in the English county of Devon. It has a population of just over 2,100 people according to the 2001 Census. The Church of England Church, St Peter's, is part of the Sid Valley Mission.

It gets its name from being on the River Sid, which runs for four miles into Lyme Bay at Sidmouth. One can walk along the river down the Byes into Sidmouth and to the sea. There is a 12th-century packhorse bridge over the river that was the site of a 1644 skirmish in the English Civil War.

In sport, there is the Sidford Tennis Club, and Sidmouth Rugby Club also have training pitches there.

Sidford's most famous pub is the Blue Ball Inn, a 14th-century lodging house that burned to the ground in 2007 and is now rebuilt.
