= Judge Vaughn =

Judge Vaughn may refer to:

- Clarence R. Vaughn Jr. (1921–2007), superior court judge of the Rockdale, Georgia, Judicial Circuit
- Fred A. Vaughn (1876–1927), county court judge of Johnson County, Kentucky
- George L. Vaughn (c. 1880–1949), state court judge in St. Louis, Missouri

== See also ==
- Horace W. Vaughan (1867–1922), judge of the United States District Court for the Territory of Hawaii
- Justice Vaughn (disambiguation)
