= Sid Vale Association =

Civic society based in Devon, England

The Sid Vale Association (SVA) is a voluntary conservation charity. It is headquartered in the coastal town of Sidmouth in the English county of Devon. Following the government's restructuring of the legal framework for charities the SVA was registered as CIO No 1154749 on 26 November 2013.

It was the first Civic Society in Britain, founded in 1846 by John Carslake. It focuses on preserving and enhancing the civic fabric and the countryside of the Sid valley and encouraging public enjoyment of facilities in the valley. The Society owns over 50 acres (200,000 m^{2}) of the countryside surrounding Sidmouth and has done extensive work within and around the town especially around 'The Byes Walk' that runs from Sidford to Sidmouth. Some of the association's works were the development of 'Margaret's Meadow' and the preservation of 'Bluebell Wood' located on Salcombe Hill, Sidmouth.

It owns and runs Sidmouth Museum, located in Hope Cottage.

It administers the Keith Owen fund. Owen left a considerable sum of money to the town in 2008. Grants are made annually from the interest of the capital he left to encourage and support initiatives which enhance the area and promote leisure and pleasure facilities.

== Publications ==
- Creeke, Julia Historic Sidmouth : life and times in Sidmouth : a guide to blue plaques Sidmouth, Sid Vale Association SVA (Revised 2013) ISBN 1-85522-179-9
- Barnard, Christine and Rab The Knowle, SIdmouth – A house and its history SVA (2013) ISBN 978-0-9512704-5-5
- Creeke, Julia The Story of Sidmouth’s Long Print SVA (2013) ISBN 978-0-9512704-4-8
- Creeke, Julia Sidmouth’s Long Print “A Picture in Time” SVA (2014) ISBN 978-0-9512704-7-9
- Sidmouth: A History SVA (Revised 2015) ISBN 978-0-9934814-0-6
- Hyman, Nigel Sidmouth – People & Places SVA (2015)
- Miles, Professor Robert Sidmouth Scientists SVA (2015)
- Woolley, Louise The Natural History of the Sid Valley through the seasons SVA (2015) ISBN 978-0-9512704-9-3
- Hyman, Nigel Sidmouth's Literary Connections SVA (2016)
- An up-to-date list of publications by the SVA will be found here https://www.sidvaleassociation.org.uk/online-shop
