= Vagn =

- Pronunciation: /ˈvɔːn/
- Gender: Male

Origin
- Meaning: Wagon, Orca
- Region of origin: Scandinavia

Other names
- Variant forms: Vaughn, Vagner, Vagnar, Vagnur

Vagn is an Old Norse masculine forename, meaning 'wagon'. In Norwegian, the name means orca. It was the name of a famous 10th-century Jomsviking, Vagn Åkesson.

The Old Norse was revived in modern Scandinavia, the first modern bearer of the name on record being Vagn Ekman (1874-1954), a Swedish oceanographer. The name became popular in Denmark during the 1920s and 1930s.

== Notable people ==
- Vagn Bennike (1888–1970), Danish resistance fighter during World War II
- Vagn Holmboe (1909–1996), Danish composer
- Vagn Hovard (1914–1998), Danish field hockey player
- Vagn Jørgensen (fl. 1930s), Danish sprint canoeist
- Vagn F. Flyger (1922–2006), Danish-American wildlife biologist
- Vagn Schmidt (born 1935), Danish sprint canoeist
- Vagn Nielsen (born 1943), Danish handball player

== Related terms ==
- Vaghn, Vaughn (disambiguation), Vaughan, Wagn, Waghn
