= R. W. Sampson =

British architect (1866–1950)

R. W. Sampson LRIBA (1866–1950) was a British architect and artist responsible for practically the whole of the architectural layout of early 20th century Sidmouth in Devon, England.

At the start of the 20th century, Col J. E. H. Balfour, together with his solicitor W. H. Hastings and architect R. W. Sampson, of Balfour Manor, was instrumental in changing the face of Sidmouth. Sampson's influence can be seen everywhere in Sidmouth; he arrived there in 1891 and for over 40 years his architectural output was prolific. He quickly established his own practice, working on both residential and commercial projects, large and small. His buildings have a solidity about them; he adapted to changing tastes but in many of his buildings he was ahead of the time. He was active in the artistic life of the town performing in Sidmouth productions.

His legacy has been enshrined in stone to mark the 150th anniversary of his birth.
