= Henry Beech Mole =

British architect, artist, and designer

- Born: 6 December 1988 (age 37)
- Education: Royal College of Art, Architectural Association

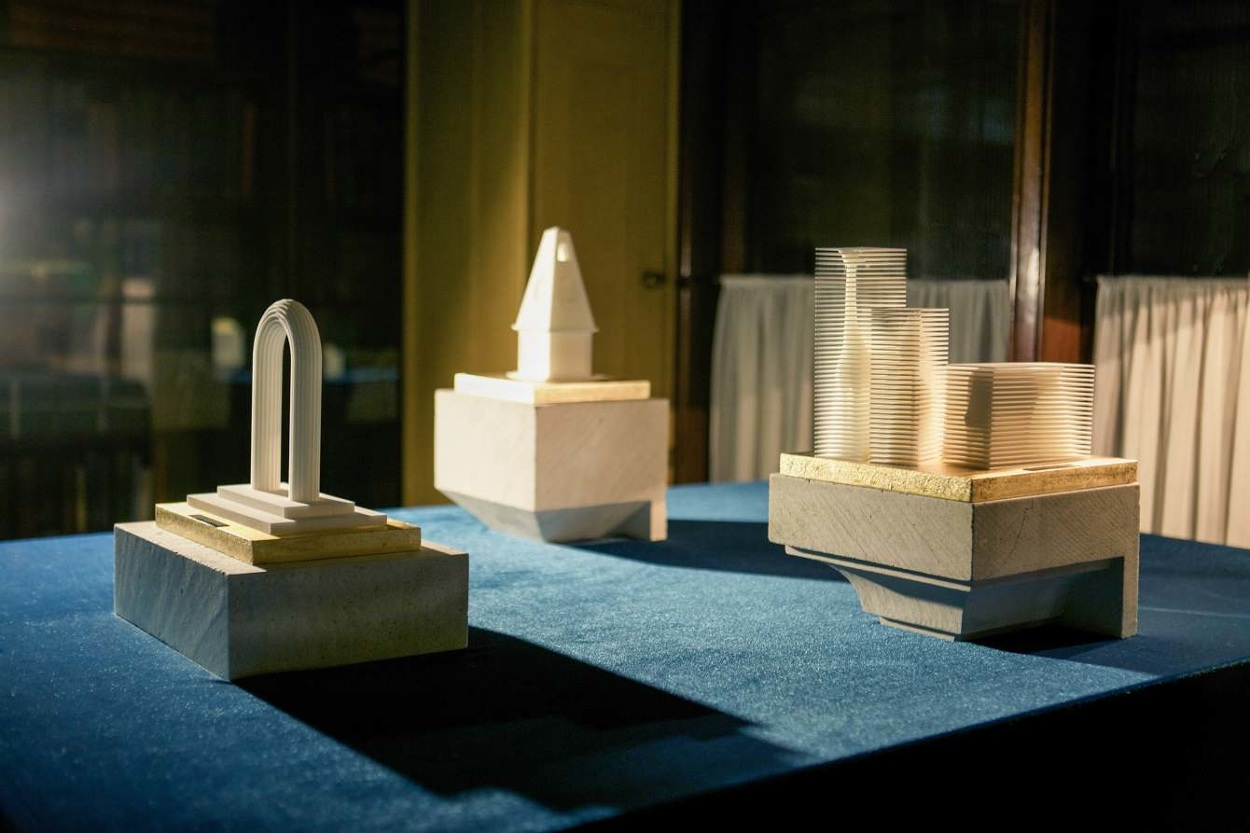
'Monumentimals' (right) shown next to Sebastian Bergne's 'Tomb of the Past' (left).

Henry Robert Beech Mole (born 6 December 1988) is a British architect, artist, and designer.

== Education and career ==
Beech Mole was educated at the Royal College of Art and the Architectural Association in London. Beech Mole is the director of architecture studio BoBo in the Montmartre district of Paris.

== Other works and projects ==
Beech Mole is a co-founder of the Architectural Institute in the 18th arrondissement of Paris, and Honorary Treasurer of the RIBA Europe Chapter. Beech Mole conceived of an architecture competition in the town of Sidmouth in Devon, to challenge a scheme to develop luxury apartments and a hotel.

== Exhibitions ==
- Romani Techtonic, 2011 - RIBA, London.
- Twitter Tissues, DataSpace, 2014 - Victoria and Albert Museum, London.
- FINSK, The Finnish Institute in London and the Residence of the Ambassador of Finland, London, 2015.
- Monumentimals, Sir John Soane Museum, London, 2015. Monumentimals is held in the permanent collection of the museum alongside over 40,000 architectural and archaeological objects.
- Gothic Superegos, Museum of Architecture and Design, Ljubljana, 2016.
- Aphrodite's Fun Palace, "Nostos" at The Old Powerhouse, Paphos, 2017.
