= Peter Orlando Hutchinson =

English diarist and artist

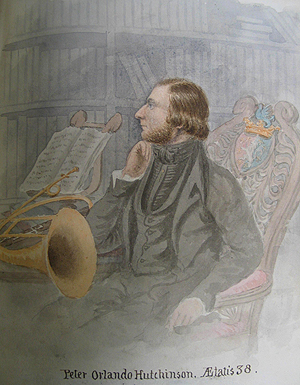
Self-portrait (c.1848)

Peter Orlando Hutchinson (1810–1897) was an English Victorian historian, diarist and artist. He was born in Winchester, but spent all his adult life in Sidmouth, Devon.

== Diaries ==
Hutchinson was a polymath whose interests ranged from politics to the preservation of telephone poles. He was also an amateur musician (flute and French horn) as well as a stonecarver. His major achievement, however, was a series of diaries and sketchbooks, containing observations on the geology, archaeology, botany and other items of interest relating to East Devon. But these studies, like his multi-volume History of Sidmouth, were not published in his lifetime.

== The Old Chancel ==
As an antiquary and passionate local historian, he tried to limit the enlargement and modernisation of the parish church in 1859. He lost the argument that not enough of the original building was being preserved, so he bought and re-erected its medieval chancel in his own garden. He used it originally as a museum and library, but he later incorporated it into a house, which still stands today. He recorded in his diaries how he added to the building, turning it into magnificent home, the Old Chancel. The result is highly idiosyncratic, including two carved self-portraits on either side of the fireplace in the chancel room, and another more whimsical work on the cantilevered staircase, the product of his youth spent in an architect’s office. The Old Chancel is the only grade 1 residential building in Sidmouth. It’s listing by English Heritage states that “it is built of old stone in a highly picturesque, if somewhat heavy Gothic style, incorporating some original Medieval work from the church. The narrow entrance front next to the old chancel has corner buttresses and a 3-centred arched doorway with drip mould. Above is a corbelled rectangular stone bay with a 2-light cusped-headed mullioned casement. The windows on the north front are 2 or 3-light mullioned casements. The roof line is irregular with gables and parapet, the east end has a pyramidal slate roof. On the south front is a tablet with monogram and the date 1864.”

== Publication of his ancestor's papers ==
Hutchinson was also a great-grandson of Massachusetts governor Thomas Hutchinson of Boston Tea Party fame. He is related to the early Australian explorer and settler Young Bingham Hutchinson, who was the direct descendant of governor Thomas Hutchinson. In 1837-38 he visited the United States and Canada, where he made over a hundred sketches. In 1880, he helped organize and publish his great-grandfather's papers.

== Museum exhibits ==
A display devoted to Hutchinson, including many of his personal items, can be seen at Sidmouth Museum.
