= Vons (disambiguation) =

Vons is a grocery store.

Vons may also refer to:

- Ventriculo-olfactory neurogenic system, a pathway in the rostral migratory stream
- VONS, a Czech acronym for Committee for the Defense of the Unjustly Prosecuted, a dissident organization

== See also ==
- Von (disambiguation)
