= Justice Vaughn =

Justice Vaughn may refer to:

- Earl W. Vaughn (1928–1986), associate justice of the North Carolina Supreme Court
- James T. Vaughn Jr. (born 1949), associate justice of the Delaware Supreme Court

== See also ==
- Judge Vaughn (disambiguation)
