= The Von =

American rock band

The VON
- Origin: South Florida, US
- Genres: Indie rock, electro, rock
- Years active: 2013-2018
- Members: Luis E. Bonilla, Marek Schneider and Elisa Seda
- Past members: Juan E. Zerpa 2013-2014 * Christopher Mcbride 2012-2013
- Website: The VON

The VON is an American band based in South Florida. The band comprises Luis Bonilla, Marek Schneider and Elisa Seda.

== History ==
The VON was formed in 2013 by the vocalist and bassist Luis E. Bonilla and the guitarist Marek Schneider. The VON has seen the majority of its career as a trio with the drummer Elisa Seda. Elisa became the part of the band when she replaced their former drummer when the band's 2015 album was recorded.

In 2015, THE VON released its album Ei8ht. The album depicts musical influences how they came together with respect to their diverse cultures, yoga ideology, and the themes of fearlessly living the life. The VON released their first single, "Nothing to Fear," in the start of 2015. This was followed by "Cry Of War" in 2016. In 2016, the VON was working on a national and European Tour.

== Discography ==
The following tracks were released by The VON:

- Protagonist, 2013 (EP)
- ei8ht, 2015 (album)
- 3nity, 2016 (EP)
- "Sacred Water", 2017 (single)
- "F4tune, 2018 (EP)
