= Vaughan, West Virginia =

Unincorporated community in West Virginia, US

Coordinates: 38°16′42″N 81°08′40″W

Vaughan is an unincorporated community in Nicholas County, in the U.S. state of West Virginia.

== History ==
A post office called Vaughan was established in 1893, and remained in operation until 1958. The community was named after Arthur L. Vaughan, a local merchant who was instrumental in securing the town a post office.
