= Vaughn, Virginia =

Human settlement in Virginia, United States

Coordinates: 38°43′07″N 78°23′51″W

Vaughn is an unincorporated community in Page County, in the U.S. state of Virginia.
