= High Peak, Devon =

Coastal hill on the south coast of Devon, England

- Cliff
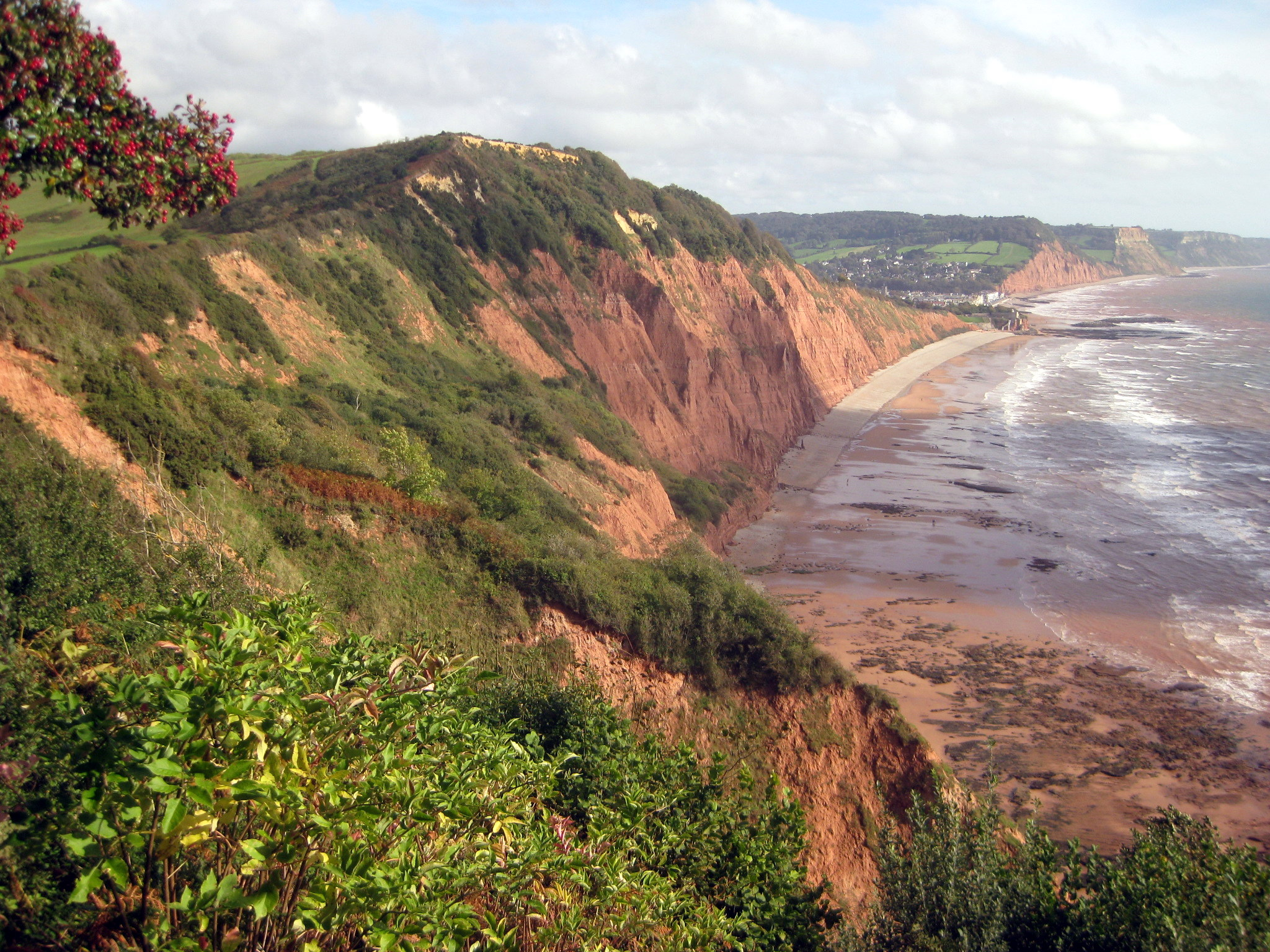
- Peak Hill cliff face with view to Sidmouth Beach

- Location within Devon
- Coordinates: 50.6640°N 3.2774°W
- Location: Devon, England

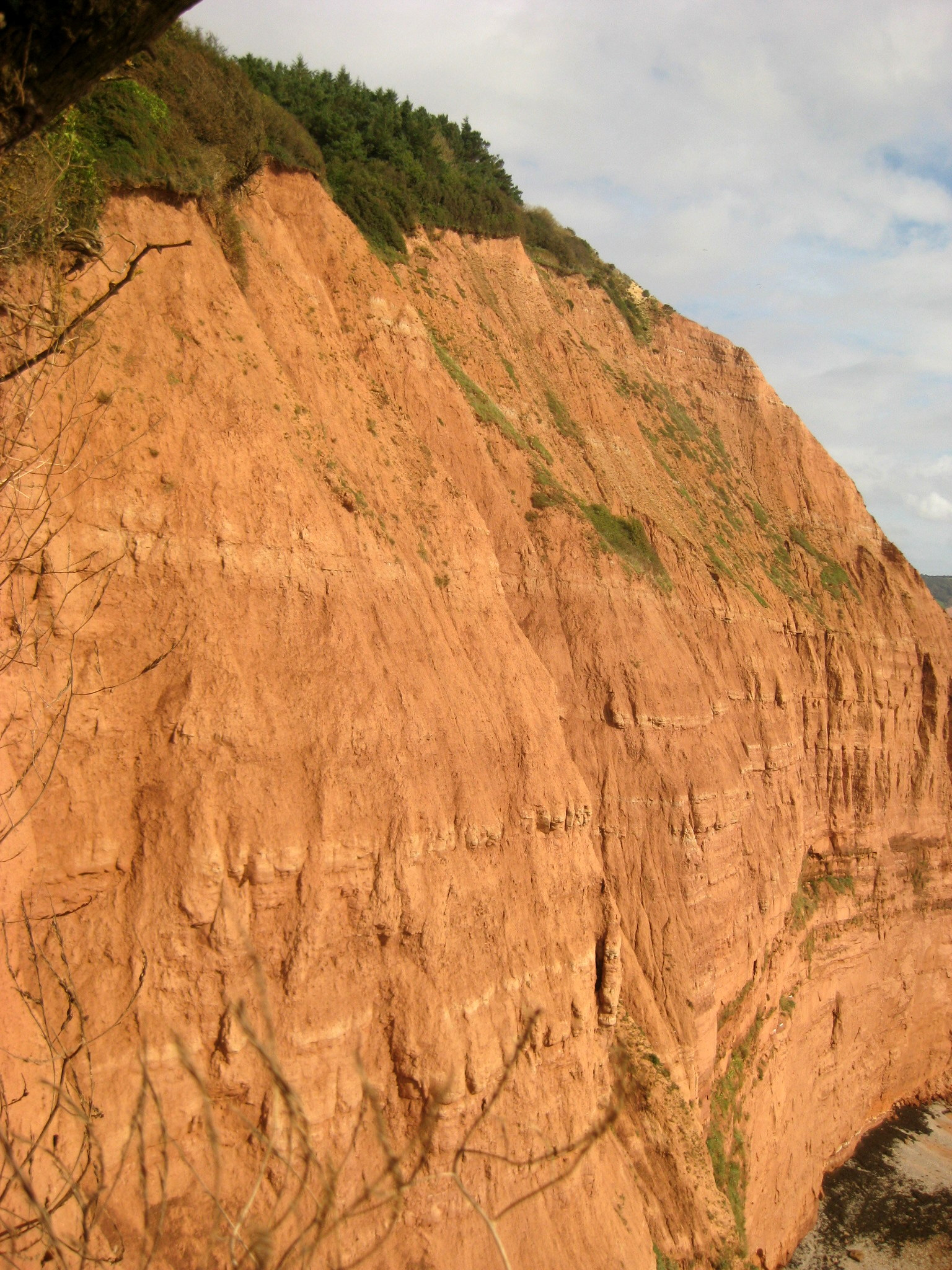
Peak Hill cliff face

High Peak (also known as Peak Hill) is a hill which is partially eroded, resulting in a cliff face, on the English Channel coast to the southwest of Sidmouth, Devon, southern England. Its highest point is about 157 metres (515 ft) above sea-level. It features a partially eroded Iron Age hill fort, with pre-Roman and post Roman pottery found there.

== History ==
On the edge of the cliff there are the remains of significant earthworks, which have been variously shown as having Iron Age, Roman and Dark Age occupation. Geological study, and the lines of the earthworks, suggest that the site once extended several tens of metres into what is now eroded away. General interpretation suggests that it was an Iron Age defensive site which saw re-use in the Dark Age period, perhaps as a coastal trading station.

== Geology ==
Within the cliffs below High Peak and Chit Rocks a number of very rare fossils of Triassic fish, reptiles and amphibians have been found.

There are four rock strata in the cliff face of High Peak. The base of the cliffs are formed by the Otter Sandstone Formation and were deposited in a hot dry climate in the Triassic Period about 220 million years ago. The deposits in the centre of the cliff face are from the Mercia Mudstone Group from about 200 million years ago.

Above these Triassic formations, there are layers of Upper Greensand, a Cretaceous rock formation about 80 million years old.

The top of High Peak is underlain by flint gravel that was probably left behind following the dissolution of an original cover of chalk during the early Paleogene period about 60 to 66 million years ago.

== Bibliography ==
- The Jurassic Coast Trust (2003). A Walk Through Time, the Official Guide to the Jurassic Coast. Coastal Publishing. ISBN 978-0-9544845-0-7.
