= Sidmouth =

Town in Devon, England

Coordinates: 50.680°N 3.239°W

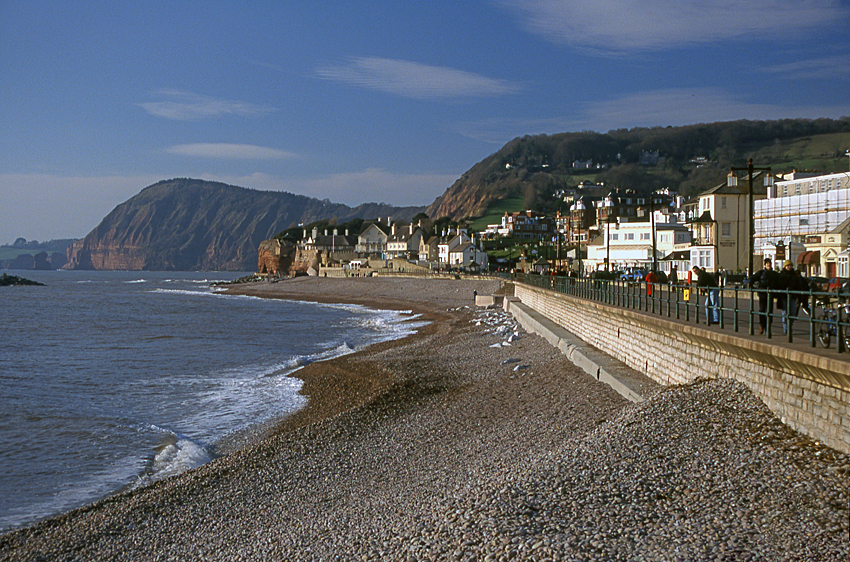
- Looking west along Sidmouth beach

- Coat of arms

- Location within Devon
- Population: 12,569
- OS grid reference: SY124874
- District: East Devon
- Shire county: Devon
- Region: South West
- Country: England
- Sovereign state: United Kingdom
- Post town: Sidmouth
- Postcode district: EX10
- Dialling code: 01395
- Police: Devon and Cornwall
- Fire: Devon and Somerset
- Ambulance: South Western
- UK Parliament: Honiton and Sidmouth
- Website: visitdevon.co.uk/sidmouth

Sidmouth (/ˈsɪdməθ/) is a town on the English Channel in Devon, South West England, 14 miles (23 km) southeast of Exeter. With a population of 13,258 in 2021, it is a tourist resort and a gateway to the Jurassic Coast World Heritage Site. A large part of the town has been designated a conservation area.

== History ==
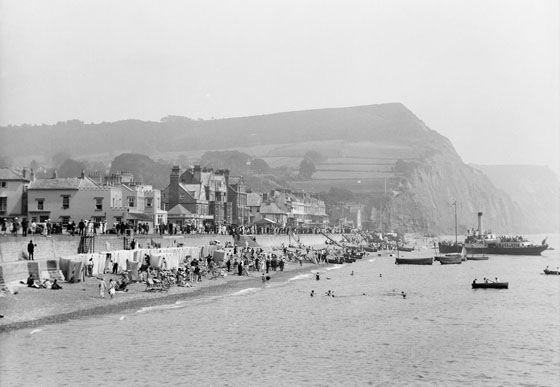
Sidmouth beach in 1924

The origins of Sidmouth pre-date recorded history. The Sid valley has been in human occupation since at least the Iron Age as attested by the presence of Sidbury Castle, and possibly earlier given the presence of Bronze Age burial mounds on Gittisham Hill and Broad Down. The village of Sidbury itself is known to be Saxon in origin with the Church crypt dating to the seventh century. However, the Sid Valley was divided into two ecclesiastical land holdings, with Sidbury and Salcombe Regis being gifted by King Athelstan to Exeter Cathedral, and Sidmouth, which was part of the manor of Otterton, was gifted by Gytha Thorkelsdóttir (the mother of King Harold Godwinson) to the Benedictines at Mont-Saint-Michel.

Sidmouth appears in the Domesday Book of 1086 as Sedemuda, meaning "mouth of the Sid". Like many such settlements, it was originally a fishing village.

By the 1200s, Sidmouth had expanded to become a market town of similar size to Sidbury and generating more income for the abbot of Mont-Saint-Michel than Otterton. By this time, Sidmouth already had a parish church, as the Otterton Cartulary refers to a grant of 30 acres of land to Guilielmas, the vicar in Sidmouth, as a glebe, and excavations in 2009 during the remodelling of the parish church revealed foundations dating from that time. It is likely that the church was already dedicated to St Giles, as the annual fair was held on his feast day 1 September. According to one of the many blue plaques found around Sidmouth, not far from the church was a chapel dedicated to St Peter built sometime before 1322, the remaining wall of which is now part of Dukes Hotel.

During the 14th century, Sidmouth enjoyed a degree of prosperity from the wine trade and, as part of the manor of Otterton, was transferred by King Henry V from Mont-Saint-Michel to Syon Abbey. King Henry VIII confiscated it again during the dissolution of the monasteries and sold it off, whereafter it changed hands several times before being acquired by the Mainwaring baronets, whose family provided two of the vicars of Sidmouth parish.

Although attempts have been made to construct a harbour, none has succeeded. A lack of shelter in the bay prevented the town's growth as a port. Despite this, a part of the town is known as 'Port Royal' which is likely due to the town's having provided two ships and 67 men to King Edward III during the Hundred Years' War with which to attack Calais. The most concerted effort was a short-lived attempt in the 1830s at the west of the seafront; this included the construction of the Sidmouth Harbour Railway along the seafront and into a tunnel at the cliffs to the east that would have transported stone from Hook Ebb. Only a few traces of the railway and tunnel survive today. The Royal National Lifeboat Institution (RNLI) operated a lifeboat station at Sidmouth between 1869 and 1912.

According to one of the Sid Vale Association Blue Plaques, a fort was built in Sidmouth in 1628, due to fear of a French invasion or naval attack, on the part of the seafront that is known as 'Fortfield' and which is now the cricket pitch.

Another of the Blue Plaques of the Sid Vale Association, confirms that the Old Ship pub (now a Costa Coffee) had operated as a tavern in Sidmouth since the 1400s and was used by smugglers. The infamous Jack Rattenbury, who was born nearby in Beer, Devon operated in the area, and was known to associate with the Mutter family of Ladram Bay (after whom Mutter's Moor on Peak Hill overlooking Sidmouth is named).

Sidmouth remained a village until the fashion for coastal resorts grew in the Georgian and Victorian periods of the 18th and 19th centuries. A number of Georgian and Regency buildings still remain. In 1819, George III's son Edward, Duke of Kent, his wife, and baby daughter (the future Queen Victoria) came to stay at Woolbrook Glen for a few weeks. In less than a month he had died of pneumonia. The house later became the Royal Glen Hotel; a plaque on an exterior wall records the visit. Sidmouth was connected to the railway network in 1874, by a branch line from Sidmouth Junction, which from there called at Ottery St Mary and Tipton St John. This was dismantled in 1967 as a result of the Beeching Axe.

In 2008, Canadian millionaire Keith Owen, who had been on holiday in the town and planned to retire there, bequeathed about £2.3 million to the community's civic society, the Sid Vale Association, upon learning that he had only weeks to live due to lung cancer. The bequest was used as a capital fund to generate an annual interest dividend of around £120,000 for community projects.

== Demographics ==
At the 2021 census, the population of Sidmouth Town was 4,400 and 2,300 households.

== Geography ==
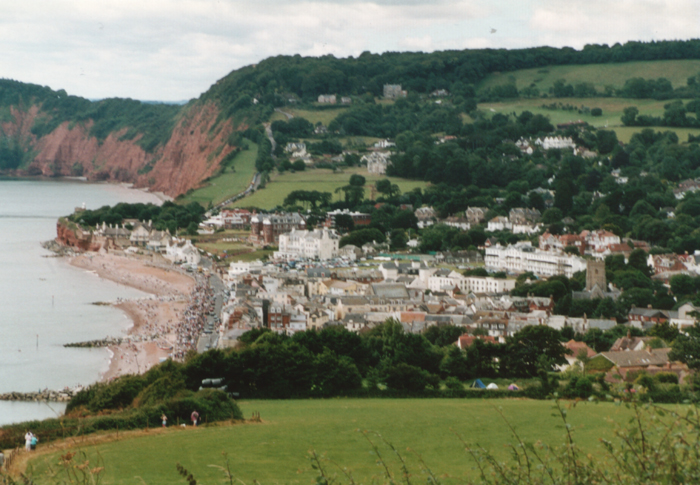
Sidmouth from Salcombe Hill

Sidmouth lies at the mouth of the River Sid in a valley between Peak Hill to the west and Salcombe Hill to the east. It is surrounded by the East Devon Area of Outstanding Natural Beauty and is on the Jurassic Coast, a World Heritage Site, and the South West Coast Path. The red-coloured rock of the Otter Sandstone in the cliffs to the west of the town indicates the arid conditions of the Triassic geological period.

Erosion of the cliffs to the east of the river mouth threatens homes and the coastal footpath, and is a serious concern.

The wide esplanade has been a prominent feature since Regency times. A series of southwesterly storms in the early 1990s washed away much of the shingle beach protecting the masonry. A set of artificial rock islands was constructed to protect the sea front, and tons of pebbles were trucked in to replace the beach.

Sidmouth has a number of conservation projects, notably the arboretum which in 2012 designated all land owned by Sidmouth Town Council as 'civic arboretum', the first town in the United Kingdom to do so.

=== Climate ===
The highest temperature recorded between 1926 and 2017 in Sidmouth is 31.0 °C (87.8 °F) on 10 August 2003, and the coldest is −10.0 °C (14.0 °F) on 1 January 1979.

Climate data for Sidmouth (1991–2020 normals, extremes 1926-2017)
Month	Jan	Feb	Mar	Apr	May	Jun	Jul	Aug	Sep	Oct	Nov	Dec	Year
Record high °C (°F)	17.0 (62.6)	16.4 (61.5)	18.9 (66.0)	22.5 (72.5)	26.9 (80.4)	29.4 (84.9)	29.2 (84.6)	31.0 (87.8)	27.8 (82.0)	22.0 (71.6)	17.8 (64.0)	16.1 (61.0)	31.0 (87.8)
Mean daily maximum °C (°F)	9.2 (48.6)	9.4 (48.9)	11.0 (51.8)	13.3 (55.9)	16.3 (61.3)	18.8 (65.8)	20.7 (69.3)	20.7 (69.3)	18.8 (65.8)	15.5 (59.9)	12.2 (54.0)	9.8 (49.6)	14.7 (58.5)
Daily mean °C (°F)	6.4 (43.5)	6.3 (43.3)	7.7 (45.9)	9.5 (49.1)	12.5 (54.5)	15.1 (59.2)	17.0 (62.6)	17.0 (62.6)	15.1 (59.2)	12.3 (54.1)	9.1 (48.4)	6.9 (44.4)	11.3 (52.3)
Mean daily minimum °C (°F)	3.5 (38.3)	3.2 (37.8)	4.3 (39.7)	5.8 (42.4)	8.7 (47.7)	11.4 (52.5)	13.3 (55.9)	13.4 (56.1)	11.3 (52.3)	9.0 (48.2)	6.1 (43.0)	4.0 (39.2)	7.9 (46.2)
Record low °C (°F)	−10.0 (14.0)	−8.9 (16.0)	−7.8 (18.0)	−2.6 (27.3)	−0.6 (30.9)	3.0 (37.4)	6.0 (42.8)	5.6 (42.1)	2.2 (36.0)	−2.8 (27.0)	−4.0 (24.8)	−7.0 (19.4)	−10.0 (14.0)
Average precipitation mm (inches)	85.3 (3.36)	66.8 (2.63)	68.3 (2.69)	60.5 (2.38)	51.4 (2.02)	54.8 (2.16)	50.3 (1.98)	70.5 (2.78)	62.6 (2.46)	89.4 (3.52)	97.2 (3.83)	94.8 (3.73)	851.7 (33.53)
Average precipitation days (≥ 1.0 mm)	13.4	11.2	10.6	10.2	8.9	8.1	7.8	9.6	8.6	12.3	13.4	14.0	128.1
Mean monthly sunshine hours	66.5	89.5	126.0	171.6	194.9	200.4	215.7	194.4	151.2	112.1	80.0	63.3	1,665.5
Source 1: Met Office
Source 2: Starlings Roost Weather

== Transport ==
=== Road ===
Sidmouth's main road access is via the A3052. This provides access to Exeter and the M5 motorway towards Birmingham and is 12 miles (19 km) away.

=== Bus ===
Stagecoach South West run services to Exeter, Exmouth and Seaton. Sidmouth is also served by AVMT Buses which runs buses to Seaton. Hatch Green coaches also run services to Whimple.

=== Railways ===
Since the closure of the Sidmouth Railway in 1967, the nearest railway stations are Feniton, Honiton or Whimple, all on the West of England line. Feniton is the nearest of these stations, being 8 miles (13 km) away.

== Government ==
Sidmouth has its own town council, presided over by a chair elected from councillors. There are eight wards, with 19 councillors in all. The town clerk is the senior paid officer, with a team of full-time and part-time staff. The town is responsible for many of the locally run services, including the information centre. Sidmouth lies within the areas of East Devon District Council and Devon County Council. The electorate of the Sidmouth ward at the 2011 census was 13,737.

Sidmouth was in the Honiton parliamentary constituency from its recreation in 1885 until its abolition in 1997, and the East Devon constituency from its recreation in 1997 until its abolition, since when it has been in the Honiton and Sidmouth constituency.

== Culture ==
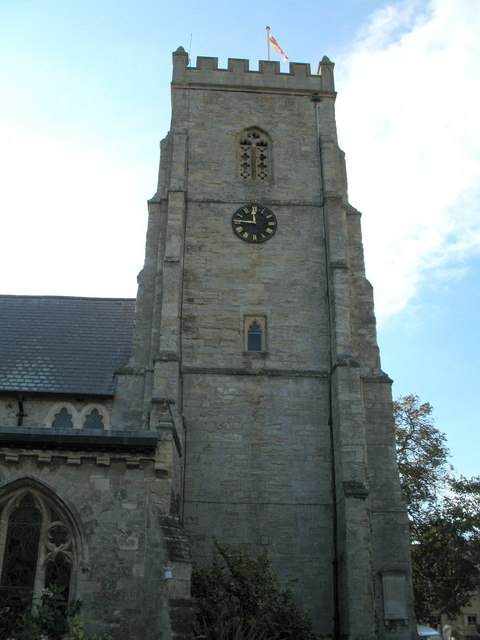
Tower of Sidmouth parish church (15th century)

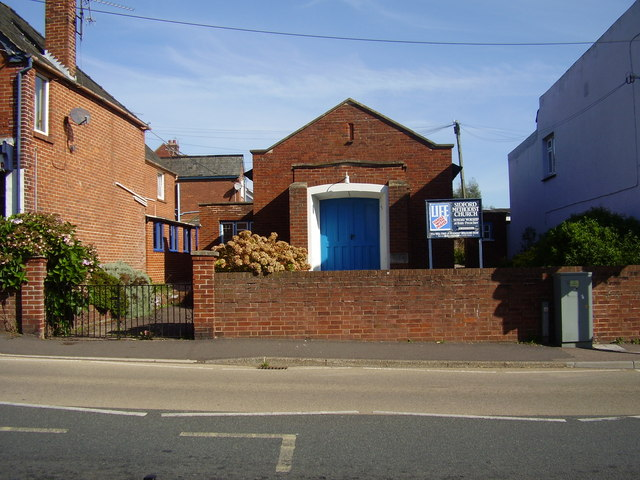
Sidford Methodist Church

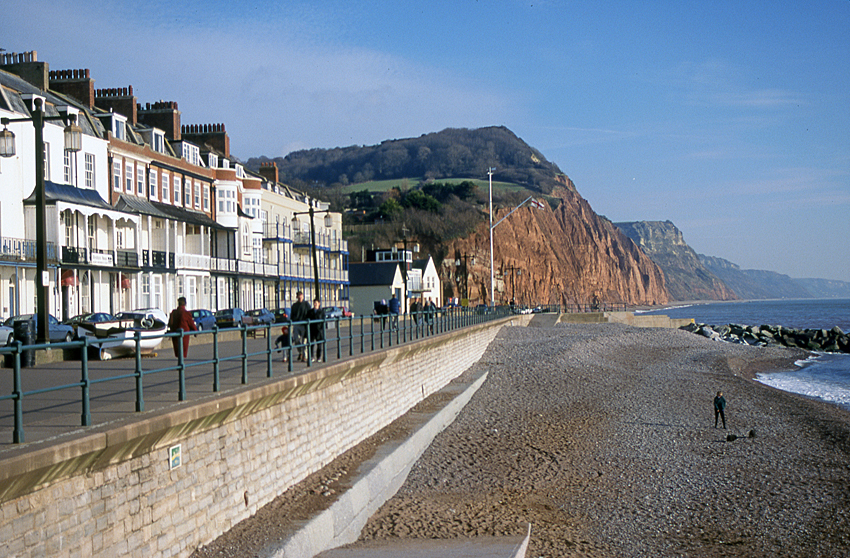
Sidmouth seafront; the red cliff is Salcombe Hill exposing Jurassic rocks

=== Churches and museums ===
The parish church is dedicated to St Giles and St Nicholas. It was rebuilt in 1860; the architect was William White. Of the medieval structure, only the 15th-century tower has been retained. Oddments of Norman and later stonework were included in the rebuilding. Features of interest include the Duke of Kent Memorial Window, which Queen Victoria gave in 1867, and the reredos by Samuel Sanders Teulon. Parts of the original fabric, such as the windows, were reused by the historian Peter Orlando Hutchinson in building a folly adjoining his house. He was also responsible for saving the stained glass in the vestry. The folly is the Old Chancel in Coburg Terrace which was started by Hutchinson in 1859, in protest over the destruction of the original church fabric during rebuilding.

Sidmouth Museum, next to the church, has local memorabilia, historical artefacts, and geological samples.

The church of All Saints, also Anglican (Taylor, architect, 1837), is in the Early English style with lancet windows and "oddly clumsy" pinnacles. There were also Unitarian, Wesleyan (later Methodist) and Congregational chapels; the Unitarian chapel was founded in the 17th century by Presbyterians and the Wesleyan and Congregational ones in 1837 and 1846 respectively.

After the Reformation, the Catholic Church returned to Sidmouth in 1880 with the arrival of exiled French Jesuits who were joined in 1881 by the Sisters of the Assumption. The convent erected a purpose built chapel which opened for public mass in 1884. By the 1920s the Catholic population had grown to require a parish church. Land at Radway was acquired in 1930 and the Church of the Most Precious Blood was built, with the first Mass being celebrated on 10 November 1935.

Sidmouth is home to the Norman Lockyer Observatory and Planetarium, located on Salcombe Hill. The facility, completed in 1912, fell into disuse but was saved from demolition by the appeals of enthusiasts to East Devon District Council. The observatory now operates as a science education project and is open to the public.

=== Music ===
==== Folk festival ====
Sidmouth Folk Festival is an annual folk festival in early August attracting musicians and visitors. It became less financially viable over the years and in 2005 the last of the commercial sponsors, essential for its existence, pulled out. To continue the tradition, individuals grouped together to form Sidmouth FolkWeek Productions, a limited company. Since the change of format, the event has been held on a smaller scale, with no arena at the Knowle, though marquees are still erected in the Blackmore Gardens and The Ham at the eastern end of the town. The popular late-night extra feature is also run at Bulverton on the edge of Sidmouth next to the main campsite.

==== Sidmouth town band ====
During the summer, Sidmouth Town Band, a brass band, play a series of concerts in the Connaught Gardens each Sunday at 8pm from late May until early September. The earliest record of the band is from a photograph of 1862.

==== Sidmouth Jazz and Blues Festival ====
The Sidmouth Jazz and Blues Festival was launched in June 2022, when performers included Ian Siegal, Italian jazz guitarist Antonio Forcione, the Ronnie Scott's All Stars, Joe Stilgoe, and Mica Paris. The 2023 lineup included Curtis Stigers, The Brand New Heavies, Mud Morganfield, and Courtney Pine; Tony Hadley, Andrew Roachford & MF Robots, Roberto Fonseca, Ruby Turner, Elles Bailey, and Mica Millar performed in 2024. In 2025 the festival featured Curtis Stigers, Soul II Soul, and Eric Bibb, among others.

The 2026 festival was held between 22 and 25 May 2026, and featured Jools Holland, Emeli Sandé, Macy Gray, Incognito, Jonah Hitchens, Luke Marzec, Pete Josef, and the Neil Angilley trio.

=== Literary associations ===
Sidmouth has featured in various literary works, e.g. as "Stymouth" in Beatrix Potter's children's story The Tale of Little Pig Robinson (1930), in which the author included views of the beach and other parts of the Devon countryside. In Thomas Hardy's Wessex it is the inspiration for "Idmouth". "Baymouth" in William Makepeace Thackeray's Pendennis, and "Spudmouth" in The Merry Adventures of Robin Hood by Howard Pyle, are both based on the town. In G. A. Henty's book With Wolfe in Canada, the hero James Walsham is from Sidmouth, and parts at the beginning and end of the book take place there. The poet Elizabeth Barrett lived in the town from 1832 until 1835. The area of rock pools around Jacob's Ladder is used as the location for H. G. Wells' The Sea Raiders. In 1962, author R. F. Delderfield had a house, 'Dove Cottage' (now 'Gazebo'), built on Peak Hill.

J.R.R. Tolkien was a regular visitor to Sidmouth and wrote parts of the early part of Lord of the Rings while on holiday with his family in 1938. Chapters drafted during the holiday encompass the hobbits escape of the Shire through the Old Forest and up to their arrival at Bree.

Sidmouth was also a favourite spot for Sir John Betjeman. He chose it as the subject of the first programme of the television series John Betjeman in the West Country that he wrote and presented in 1962. The script takes the form of an extended poem and was republished in 2000 as a short book.

The town has been the setting for television dramas, such as a 1987 adaptation of William Trevor's novel The Children of Dynmouth, an ITV adaptation of Agatha Christie's Marple in summer 2005, and the 2022 HBO series The Gilded Age.

=== Miscellaneous ===
The Sidmouth Herald is the local newspaper.

Local radio is provided by BBC Radio Devon and Radio Exe Devon.

Manor Pavilion houses an arts centre and a theatre that hosts both amateur and professional productions. There is also the Radway Cinema.

Sidmouth has been a frequent winner of Britain in Bloom awards. Most recently it won the Small Town category in 2001 and the Coastal Resort category in 2005.

The Sid Vale Association, the first civic society in Britain, was founded in 1846 and is based in Sidmouth.

In 2016, a worldwide architectural competition was held in the town to provide ideas for the future redevelopment of Sidmouth's eastern town and seafront. The competition was initiated by Sidmouth Architect Henry Beech Mole.

In October 2018, it was discovered that an unusually large 64-metre (210 ft) fatberg was constricting the sewers. A team of scientists from the University of Exeter studied it and attributed it to the ageing population and its food habits. It was removed and turned into energy at a local power plant.

=== Twin towns ===
Sidmouth is twinned with Le Locle in Switzerland.

== Features ==
The Esplanade is the sea front road from the red cliffs of Salcombe Hill in the east towards Jacob's Ladder Beach at the west. Peak Hill can be seen in the distance.

Jacob's Ladder is a series of wooden steps leading up to Connaught Gardens from Jacob's Ladder Beach and its red cliffs.

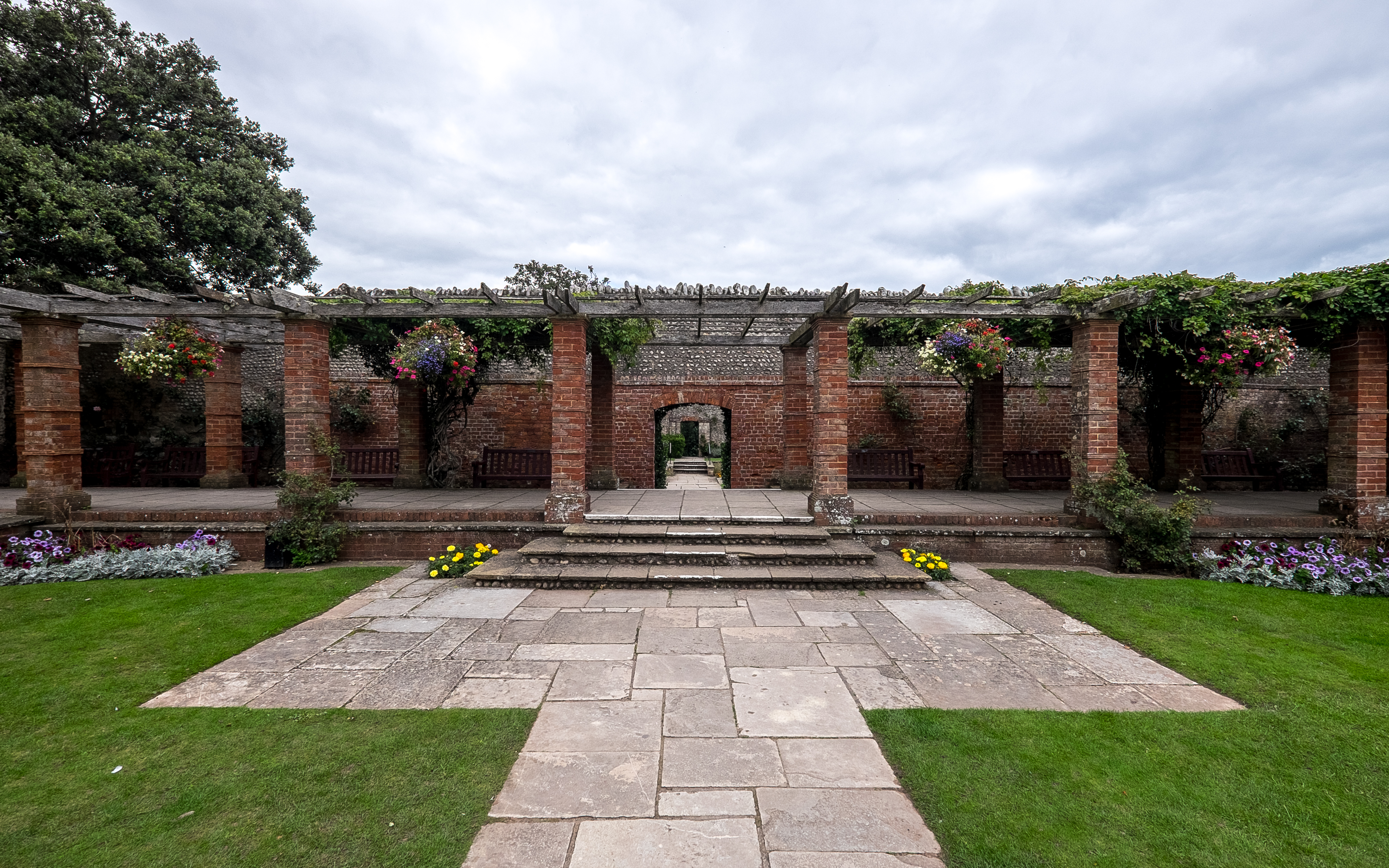
Connaught Gardens in September

Connaught Gardens date from around 1820. They were named after the Duke of Connaught, the third son of Queen Victoria, who officially opened the gardens in 1934. The bandstand there is used by bands in many weeks of the summer season.

This grassy slope up and along Peak Hill follows the red cliffs above Jacob's Ladder Beach. It provides a wide view eastwards over the whole town towards Salcombe Hill.

== Economy ==
The principal revenue is from tourism, with a wide range of hotels and guest houses, as well as self catering accommodation in the local area. Sidmouth is a retirement location, so pensioner spending is another source of income.

The largest employer is East Devon District Council, the headquarters of which are at the former Knowle Hotel. The headquarters were transferred to Honiton in 2019. There is a large independent department store, Fields of Sidmouth, which has been on the same site for over 200 years. There are pubs, restaurants, coffee houses and tea rooms; also an indoor swimming pool, a sports hall at the leisure centre, and a golf course.

== Education ==
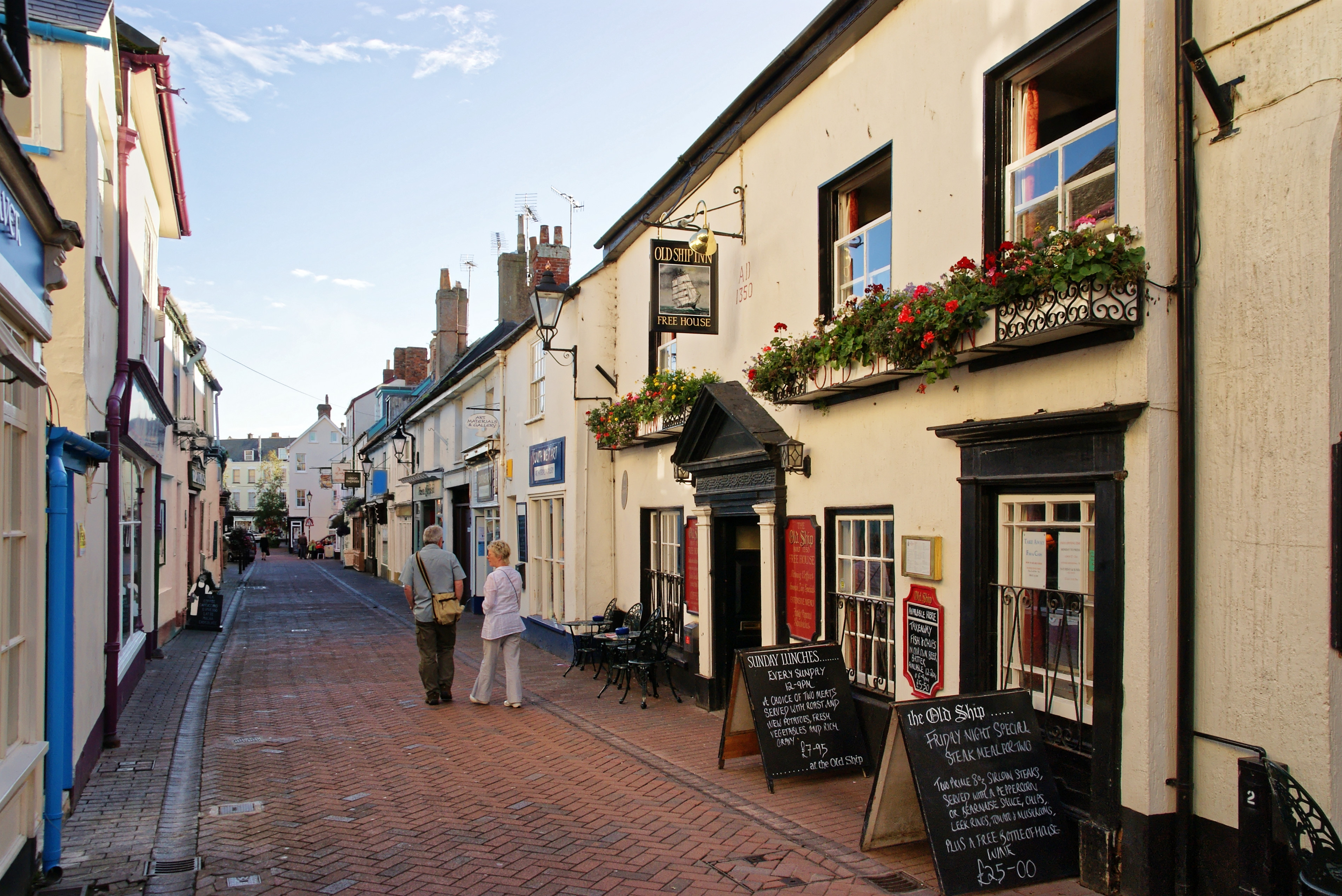
Old Fore Street (pedestrian zone)

Sidmouth College is a comprehensive school which takes children aged between 11 and 18 from as far afield as Exmouth and Exeter. In February 2012, with 852 pupils on the roll, the college was deemed 'Good' by Ofsted. The judgment of improvement in the college's provision followed the previous inspection (May 2009) when it was deemed 'satisfactory'. In the 2005 Ofsted report, when there were 869 students on the roll, it was also deemed 'satisfactory'.

Sidmouth College is situated in the Sid Valley. It admits students from East Devon.

There is one state junior school, which takes children from between the ages of 8 and 11. There are two state infant schools. There is, additionally, a private school: St John's International School (formerly known as the Convent of the Assumption) which takes children from two to 18, including overseas boarders. In 2007, it was taken over by International Education Systems (IES).

Sidmouth International School is an English language school for foreign pupils.

== Notable people ==
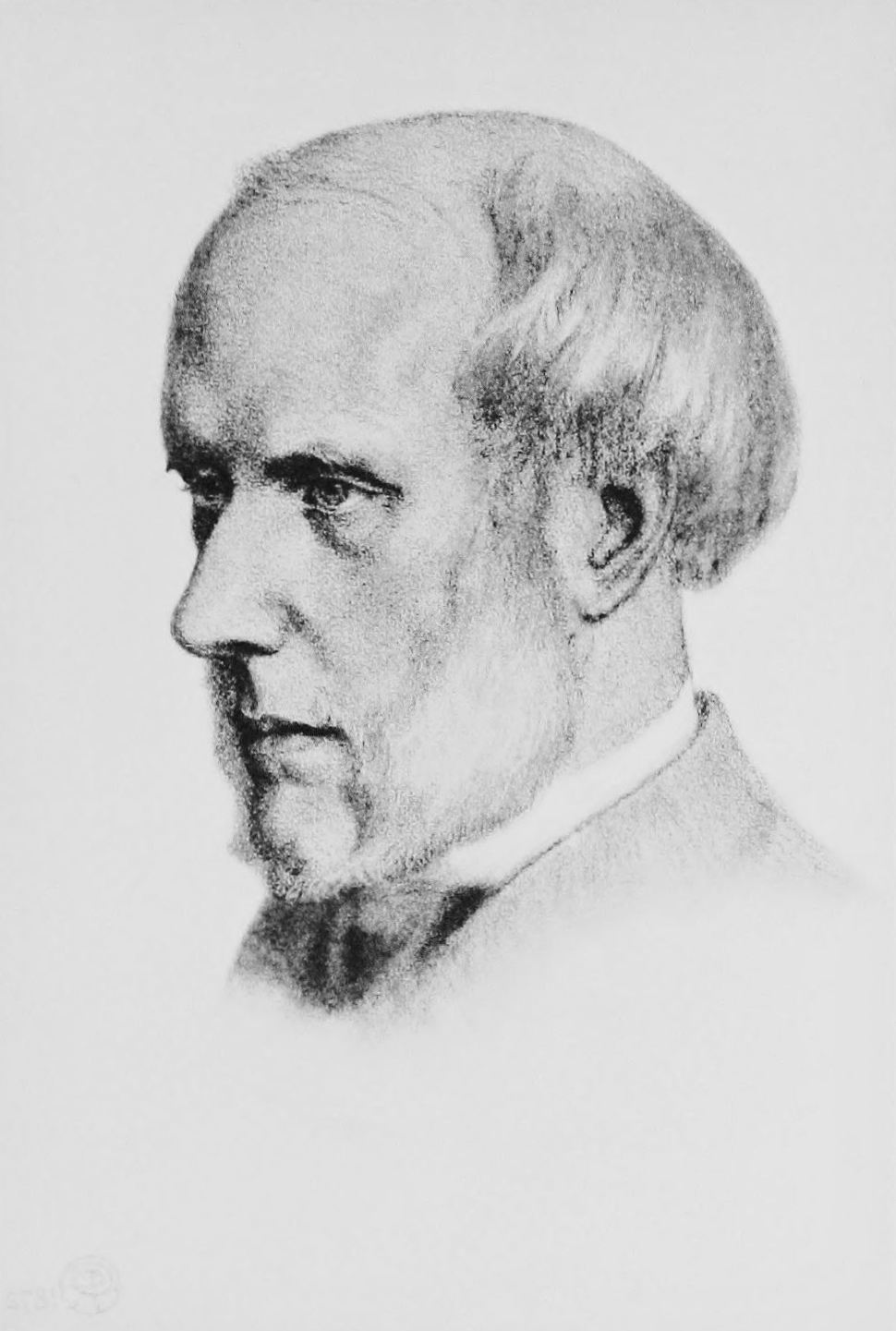
Thomas Gordon Hake, 1895

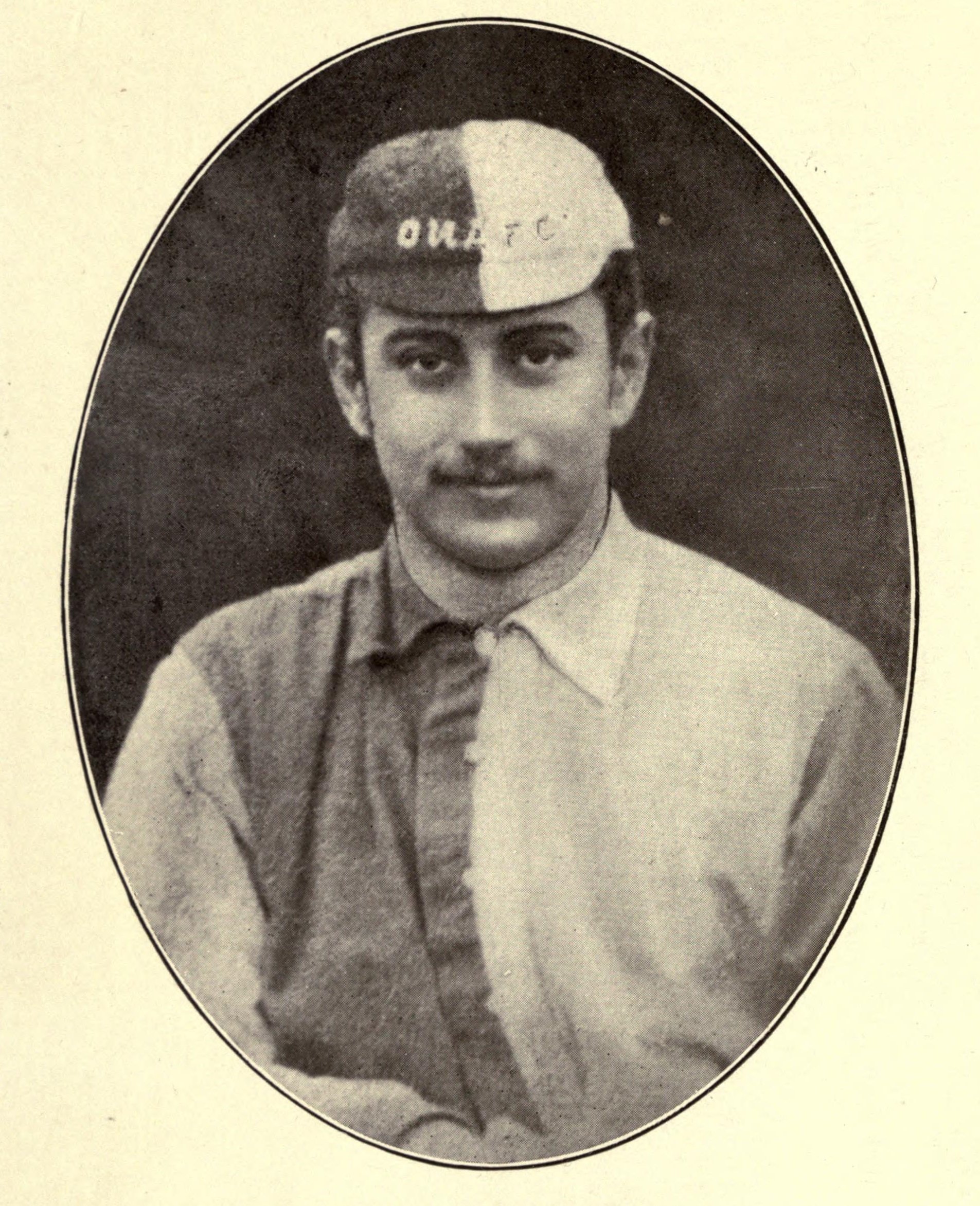
Charles John Cornish, 1907

- Prince Edward, Duke of Kent and Strathearn (1767–1820), died in Sidmouth.
- Arthur Broome (1779–1837), a clergyman and campaigner for animal welfare; co-creator of the RSPCA in 1824
- Thomas Gordon Hake (1809–1895), an English physician and poet, brought up locally.
- James Fawckner Nicholls (1818–1883), an English antiquarian and librarian.
- Adolph Friedrich Lindemann (1836–1931), engineer and amateur astronomer, lived at Sidholme mansion
- John Horn Jr. (1843–1920), an English-American boatbuilder, he received a Congressional Gold Medal in 1874 for saving more than 100 people from drowning.
- William Saville-Kent (1845–1908), marine biologist, naturalist and author; he developed the artificial pearl industry.
- Charles John Cornish (1858–1906), an English naturalist and writer.
- R. W. Sampson (1866–1950), architect, he designed most of the town
- Harry Pursey (1891–1980) a naval officer, politician, MP for Kingston upon Hull East, from 1945 to 1970.
- Edmund Leach (1910–1989), social anthropologist and academic
- Elisabeth Svendsen (1930–2011), animal welfare advocate and former hotelier; she founded The Donkey Sanctuary in 1969
- Julian Wilson (1940–2014), BBC Television's horse racing correspondent from 1966 to 1997.
- Stuart Hughes (born c. 1950), local councillor for the Official Monster Raving Loony Party and the Conservative Party UK
- Julia Slingo (born 1950), meteorologist and climate scientist.
