= River Sid =

River in Devon, England

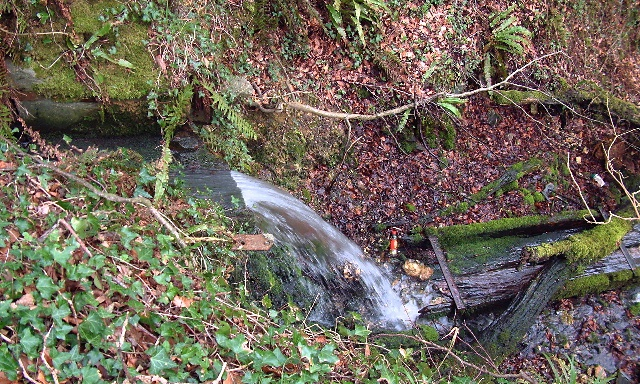
- Head of goyle close to source of River Sid

Physical characteristics
- Source
  - location: Crowpits Covert, East Devon
  - coordinates: 50.7000°N 3.2000°W
  - elevation: 206 m (676 ft) above sea level
- Mouth
  - location: Sidmouth, East Devon
  - coordinates: 50.6721°N 3.2391°W
- Length: 6.5 miles (10.5 km)

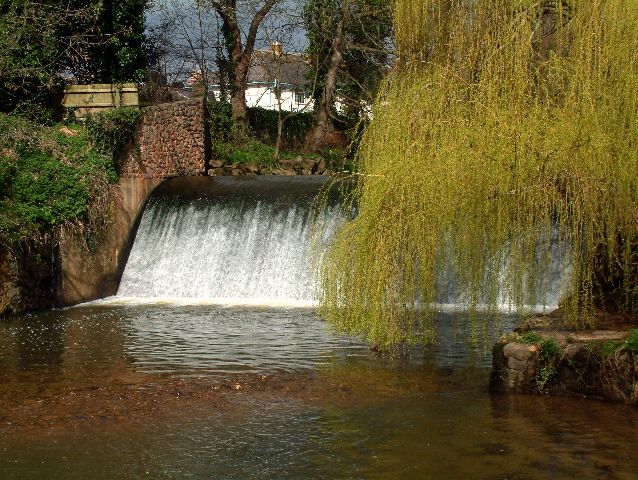
Weir on River Sid at Sidmouth

The River Sid, situated in East Devon, has a claim to be the shortest complete river in England. It flows for 6.5 miles (10.5 km) southwards from a source in Crowpits Covert (OSGB36 Grid reference SY138963) at a height of 676 feet (206 m) above sea level. The source is at the head of a goyle or small ravine.

The ground beneath the area is made of silty mudstones and sandstones from the Triassic period, which don't let water pass through. On top of this are more water-permeable layers of greensand and clay with flints. A line of springs forms where the greensand meets the less permeable rock below.

The river flows through Sidbury and Sidford to Sidmouth and is fed by springs flowing from East Hill and water from the Roncombe Stream, the Snod Brook and the Woolbrook. In Sidmouth the river outflows at the Ham through a shingle bar.

The Sid Vale Association, the first Civic Society in Britain (founded in 1846), is based in the Sid Vale.
