= Salcombe Regis =

Village in Devon, England

Coordinates: 50.69357°N 3.20705°W

- Salcombe Regis

- Location within Devon
- OS grid reference: SY148888
- Civil parish: Sidmouth
- District: East Devon
- Shire county: Devon
- Region: South West
- Country: England
- Sovereign state: United Kingdom
- Post town: SIDMOUTH
- Postcode district: EX10
- Police: Devon and Cornwall
- Fire: Devon and Somerset
- Ambulance: South Western
- UK Parliament: Honiton and Sidmouth

Salcombe Regis is a coastal village and former civil parish, now in the parish of Sidmouth, in the East Devon district, in the county of Devon, England. Mentioned in the Domesday Book as "a manor called Selcoma" held by Osbern FitzOsbern, bishop of Exeter, the manor house stood on the site now occupied by Thorn Farm. The thorn tree growing in an enclosure at the road junction above the farm marked the cultivation boundary between manor and common ground. In 1951 the parish had a population of 869. On 1 April 1974 the parish was abolished and merged with Sidmouth.

The church of St Peter was built c. 1107 and restored in 1845. It contains monuments to the distinguished scientists Sir Ambrose Fleming and Sir Norman Lockyer, both buried there.

== See also ==
- Regis (Place)
- List of place names with royal patronage in the United Kingdom
