= Grade II* listed buildings in East Devon =

East Devon shown in Devon

There are over 20,000 Grade II* listed buildings in England. This page is a list of these buildings in the district of East Devon in Devon.

== East Devon ==
Name	Location	Type	Completed (Note: The date given is the date used by Historic England as significant for the initial building or that of an important part in the structure's description.)	Date designated	Grid ref. (Note: The grid reference is based on the British national grid reference system, sometimes known as OSGB36, used by the Ordnance Survey.) Geo-coordinates	Entry number (Note: The "List Entry Number" is a unique number assigned to each listed building and scheduled monument by Historic England.)	Image
Coaxdon Hall	All Saints	House	c. 1590	8 May 1967	ST3110600839; 50°48′11″N 2°58′45″W	1098577	Upload Photo
Wadhayes Farmhouse	Awliscombe	Farmhouse	1621	22 February 1955	ST1363203173; 50°49′18″N 3°13′39″W	1098096	Upload Photo
Church of St Mary	Axminster	Parish church	13th century	11 August 1950	SY2964198492; 50°46′54″N 2°59′58″W	1333520	Church of St Mary More images
Oak House	Axminster	House	1758	11 August 1950	SY2985098677; 50°47′00″N 2°59′47″W	1103761	Upload Photo
Premises of G C Bateman	Axminster	Shop	Early 19th century	11 August 1950	SY2979398598; 50°46′58″N 2°59′50″W	1098640	Upload Photo
Weycroft Manor and Weycroft Well House	Weycroft, Axminster	Manor house	c. 16th century	6 June 1983	SY3076299846; 50°47′38″N 2°59′01″W	1162537	Weycroft Manor and Weycroft Well House More images
Axmouth Bridge	Axmouth	Road bridge	1877	19 October 1984	SY2529889982; 50°42′17″N 3°03′33″W	1098598	Axmouth Bridge More images
Bindon Manor House	Axmouth	Manor house	15th century	8 May 1967	SY2706690457; 50°42′33″N 3°02′03″W	1169515	Bindon Manor House More images
Outbuildings, garden walls and enclosing wall and balustrade to Stedcombe House	Stedcombe, Axmouth	Stableyard and garden walls	1690s	19 October 1984	SY2638391954; 50°43′21″N 3°02′39″W	1333511	Upload Photo
Stepps Country Club	Axmouth	House	16th century	8 May 1967	SY2609190946; 50°42′48″N 3°02′54″W	1098599	Upload Photo
Church of the Blessed Virgin Mary	Aylesbeare	Parish church	Early 16th century	30 June 1961	SY0376991952; 50°43′09″N 3°21′52″W	1328734	Church of the Blessed Virgin Mary More images
Bovey House including outbuilding adjoining north	Beer	Manor house	Late 16th century	11 September 1951	SY2084890370; 50°42′27″N 3°07′20″W	1333514	Bovey House including outbuilding adjoining north More images
Front garden boundary wall and gateway immediately east of Bovey House	Beer	Garden wall and gateway	17th century	19 October 1984	SY2088090345; 50°42′26″N 3°07′19″W	1169601	Upload Photo
Bicton Cross	Bicton	Cross	1743	30 June 1961	SY0717385326; 50°39′37″N 3°18′53″W	1097585	Bicton Cross More images
Bicton House, Devon School of Agriculture	Bicton	Country house	c. 1800	11 November 1952	SY0704086432; 50°40′12″N 3°19′01″W	1334023	Bicton House, Devon School of Agriculture More images
Church of St Mary	Bicton	Parish church	1850	30 June 1961	SY0730585738; 50°39′50″N 3°18′46″W	1203724	Church of St Mary More images
Garden ornaments and furniture in the Italianate Gardens at Bicton Park	Bicton	Garden ornaments	Early 19th century	11 November 1952	SY0727085940; 50°39′57″N 3°18′48″W	1097550	Garden ornaments and furniture in the Italianate Gardens at Bicton Park More images
Orangery including hot houses adjoining to north west and south east of Bicton Park	Bicton	Orangery	Early 19th century	10 February 1987	SY0736085968; 50°39′58″N 3°18′44″W	1097549	Orangery including hot houses adjoining to north west and south east of Bicton Park More images
Sidmouth Lodge and adjoining boundary walls at Bicton Park	Bicton	Entrance lodge	Late 18th – early 19th century	11 November 1952	SY0767785934; 50°39′57″N 3°18′28″W	1281498	Sidmouth Lodge and adjoining boundary walls at Bicton Park More images
The hermitage including pond, rockeries and waterfalls to the south of Bicton Park	Bicton	Summer house	c. 1840	10 February 1987	SY0677886218; 50°40′05″N 3°19′14″W	1097547	The hermitage including pond, rockeries and waterfalls to the south of Bicton Park More images
Homeliving	Brampford Speke	Farmhouse	Early 16th century	11 November 1952	SX9257198579; 50°46′37″N 3°31′30″W	1333977	Upload Photo
Church Living and Church Living Cottage	Branscombe	Cruck house	Late 15th – early 16th century	22 February 1955	SY1957188517; 50°41′27″N 3°08′24″W	1104143	Upload Photo
Edge Barton Manor	Branscombe	Manor house	16th century	22 February 1955	SY1853689932; 50°42′12″N 3°09′18″W	1104129	Upload Photo
Hole Farmhouse including gate piers adjoining east end	Branscombe	Farmhouse	Early to mid 16th century	22 February 1955	SY1913789471; 50°41′57″N 3°08′47″W	1333291	Upload Photo
Margells	Branscombe Street, Branscombe	Cruck house	Late 16th century	22 February 1955	SY1885288845; 50°41′37″N 3°09′01″W	1104149	Upload Photo
Killerton House and Ha Ha approximately 20 metres in front of entrance	Killerton Park, Broad Clyst	Country house	1778	11 November 1952	SS9734900089; 50°47′28″N 3°27′28″W	1098331	Killerton House and Ha Ha approximately 20 metres in front of entrance More images
The Bear's Hut 220 metres north north west of Killerton House	Killerton Park, Broad Clyst	Summer house	Before 1831	20 May 1985	SS9714100154; 50°47′30″N 3°27′39″W	1170706	The Bear's Hut 220 metres north north west of Killerton House More images
Marker's Cottage	Broad Clyst	House	16th century	20 May 1985	SX9854497224; 50°45′57″N 3°26′24″W	1170878	Marker's Cottage More images
Newhall Farmhouse and Ha Ha to Rear	Broad Clyst	Farmhouse	15th century	20 May 1985	SX9810599213; 50°47′01″N 3°26′48″W	1170183	Newhall Farmhouse and Ha Ha to Rear
Old Park	Broad Clyst	Farmhouse	14th or early 15th century	20 May 1985	SX9650895202; 50°44′50″N 3°28′06″W	1170252	Upload Photo
Bakers Dairy Cottage and Bakers Farmhouse	Dulford, Broadhembury	House	17th century	27 January 1989	ST0703405936; 50°50′44″N 3°19′19″W	1333792	Upload Photo
Church Gate	Broadhembury	House	16th century	22 February 1955	ST1015004722; 50°50′06″N 3°16′38″W	1204377	Upload Photo
Theydon	Broadhembury	Cruck house	Early 17th century	27 January 1989	ST1014404756; 50°50′07″N 3°16′39″W	1098073	Upload Photo
Kerswell Priory including walls of walled garden	Kerswell, Broadhembury	House	c. late 16th century	27 January 1989	ST0742506429; 50°51′00″N 3°18′59″W	1098042	Kerswell Priory including walls of walled garden More images
Pale House	Kerswell, Broadhembury	House	17th century	27 January 1989	ST0796306058; 50°50′48″N 3°18′31″W	1281115	Upload Photo
The Drewe Arms Including Curved Wall adjoining at North West	Broadhembury	Public house	17th century	22 February 1951	ST1010904758; 50°50′07″N 3°16′40″W	1204396	The Drewe Arms Including Curved Wall adjoining at North West More images
Church of St Mary and St Giles	Buckerell	Parish church	1319	22 February 1955	ST1232200363; 50°47′46″N 3°14′44″W	1333760	Church of St Mary and St Giles More images
Church of St Andrew	Chardstock	Parish church	15th century, rebuilt 1864	8 May 1967	ST3088304440; 50°50′07″N 2°58′58″W	1333540	Church of St Andrew More images
Lower Ridge	Chardstock	Farmhouse	Late/mid 17th century	8 May 1967	ST2993805946; 50°50′56″N 2°59′48″W	1098584	Upload Photo
The George Public House including Outbuilding Adjoining North East	Chardstock	Public house	c. 16th century	8 May 1967	ST3098004479; 50°50′09″N 2°58′53″W	1333537	The George Public House including Outbuilding Adjoining North East More images
Church of St Michael	Clyst Honiton	Parish church	15th century or earlier	30 June 1961	SX9894293525; 50°43′57″N 3°26′00″W	1203333	Church of St Michael More images
Great Auncke Manor and Auncke Cottage	Aunk, Clyst Hydon	House	Late 17th century	11 November 1952	ST0480200361; 50°47′42″N 3°21′08″W	1098165	Great Auncke Manor and Auncke Cottage More images
Town Tenement Farmhouse	Clyst Hydon	Farmhouse	Early 16th century	24 October 1988	ST0336401485; 50°48′17″N 3°22′22″W	1162129	Upload Photo
Ebford Manor	Ebford, Clyst St George	Detached house	1710	11 November 1952	SX9814987713; 50°40′48″N 3°26′35″W	1104182	Ebford Manor More images
Gates and Gatepiers 12 Metres North-west of Ebford Manor with Length of Garden Wall to Right	Ebford, Clyst St George	Gate	c. 1710	11 November 1952	SX9814187729; 50°40′49″N 3°26′35″W	1166058	Upload Photo
The Old Rectory Including Kitchen Garden Walls adjoining to North	Clyst St Lawrence	House	Early 16th century	24 October 1988	ST0266600046; 50°47′30″N 3°22′56″W	1162222	Upload Photo
Winslade Park	Clyst St Mary	House	c. 1800	19 March 1987	SX9781090314; 50°42′12″N 3°26′55″W	1097566	Winslade Park
White Lodge	Winslade Park, Clyst St Mary	Lodge	1812	11 November 1952	SX9764290926; 50°42′32″N 3°27′04″W	1097571	White Lodge More images
Church of St John the Baptist	Colaton Raleigh	Church	Late 15th – early 16th century	30 June 1961	SY0816187168; 50°40′37″N 3°18′04″W	1097559	Church of St John the Baptist More images
Place Court	Colaton Raleigh	House	16th – 17th century	11 November 1952	SY0800287314; 50°40′41″N 3°18′12″W	1097561	Upload Photo
Great House	Colyton	House	c. late 16th century	8 May 1967	SY2464693924; 50°44′24″N 3°04′09″W	1098541	Great House
Church of St Nicholas	Combe Raleigh	Parish church	15th century	22 February 1955	ST1585802332; 50°48′52″N 3°11′45″W	1333782	Church of St Nicholas More images
All Hallows School including Former Stables Adjoining West and Forecourt Area Wall and Gate Piers to North	Rousdon, Combpyne Rousdon	Country house	1874	2 September 1983	SY2951690530; 50°42′36″N 2°59′59″W	1098515	Upload Photo
Film Studio at All Hallows School & the Old Church	Rousdon, Combpyne Rousdon	Church	c. 1870	14 June 1977	SY2938890496; 50°42′35″N 3°00′05″W	1170563	Upload Photo
Church of St Michael	Cotleigh	Parish church	Early 16th century	22 February 1955	ST2063602209; 50°48′50″N 3°07′40″W	1098246	Church of St Michael More images
Cotleigh House	Cotleigh	House	Probably late 18th or early 19th century	22 February 1955	ST2068702226; 50°48′51″N 3°07′38″W	1333667	Upload Photo
South Wood Farmhouse	Cotleigh	Farmhouse	Late 15th to early 16th century	22 February 1955	ST2085604053; 50°49′50″N 3°07′31″W	1098289	Upload Photo
Loughwood Chapel	Dalwood	Baptist chapel	Probably late 17th or early 18th century	8 May 1967	SY2531999267; 50°47′17″N 3°03′39″W	1333577	Loughwood Chapel More images
Connets Farmhouse including Outbuilding adjoining to the South-east and Front Garden Walls	Dunkeswell	Farmhouse	17th century	22 February 1955	ST1409507744; 50°51′46″N 3°13′19″W	1146555	Upload Photo
Coxen, Long Orchard	Knowle, East Budleigh	House	1911	3 December 1982	SY0465583126; 50°38′24″N 3°20′59″W	1097529	Upload Photo
Hayes Barton including Garden Walls Adjoining to the South East	East Budleigh	Farmhouse	Late 16th – early 17th century	11 November 1952	SY0503585207; 50°39′32″N 3°20′42″W	1334014	Hayes Barton including Garden Walls Adjoining to the South East More images
Salem Church including Boundary Walls and Assembly Room	East Budleigh	Chapel	1719	30 June 1961	SY0702585057; 50°39′28″N 3°19′00″W	1097511	Salem Church including Boundary Walls and Assembly Room More images
Tidwell Manor	East Budleigh	Country house	1725	11 November 1952	SY0598583295; 50°38′30″N 3°19′51″W	1097565	Tidwell Manor More images
Vicarsmead including Boundary Walls adjoining to East and West	East Budleigh	House	17th century	11 November 1952	SY0644884821; 50°39′20″N 3°19′29″W	1281217	Upload Photo
Church of St John in the Wilderness	Withycombe Raleigh, Exmouth	Parish church	15th century	6 December 1949	SY0281483370; 50°38′31″N 3°22′33″W	1333479	Church of St John in the Wilderness More images
Parish Church of St Margaret and St Andrew	Littleham, Exmouth	Parish church	Late medieval	6 December 1949	SY0290981296; 50°37′24″N 3°22′26″W	1317702	Parish Church of St Margaret and St Andrew More images
Parish Church of the Holy Trinity	Exmouth	Parish church	1824	15 June 1978	SY0021180659; 50°37′01″N 3°24′43″W	1333475	Parish Church of the Holy Trinity More images
The Barn	Exmouth	House	1897	6 November 1972	SY0141880007; 50°36′41″N 3°23′41″W	1164569	The Barn More images
Church of St Petrock and St Barnabus	Farringdon	Parish church	1870	26 May 1987	SY0177291221; 50°42′44″N 3°23′33″W	1328759	Church of St Petrock and St Barnabus More images
Upham Farmhouse	Farringdon	Farmhouse	Early 17th century	26 May 1987	SY0212490704; 50°42′28″N 3°23′15″W	1141401	Upload Photo
Boycombe Farmhouse	Farway	Farmhouse	Late 16th century	22 February 1955	SY1671496166; 50°45′33″N 3°10′56″W	1333316	Boycombe Farmhouse
Church of St Michael	Church Green, Farway	Parish church	15th century	22 February 1955	SY1723896463; 50°45′43″N 3°10′29″W	1309200	Church of St Michael More images
Hornshayne Farmhouse Including Front Garden Wall Adjoining to South and Granary and Stables Adjoining to North	Farway	Farmhouse	c. 1700	22 February 1955	SY1957894584; 50°44′43″N 3°08′28″W	1104109	Upload Photo
Poltimore Farmhouse	Farway	Farmhouse	Probably mid to late 15th century	22 February 1955	SY1768697105; 50°46′04″N 3°10′07″W	1333319	Upload Photo
Woodbridge Farmhouse including Former Stables adjoining South-west	Farway	Farmhouse	Probably early to mid 16th century	8 March 1988	SY1880295234; 50°45′04″N 3°09′09″W	1163559	Upload Photo
Church of St Andrew	Feniton	Parish church	Early 16th century	22 February 1955	SY1086399420; 50°47′15″N 3°15′57″W	1333731	Church of St Andrew More images
Shermans Farmhouse	Gittisham	Farmhouse	1575	22 February 1955	SY1273497560; 50°46′16″N 3°14′20″W	1098025	Upload Photo
Town Farmhouse including Walls to Walled Garden to the South	Gittisham	Farmhouse	18th century	22 February 1955	SY1329398423; 50°46′44″N 3°13′52″W	1205084	Upload Photo
Walls to the Vineyard including Gate Piers and Walls to the Terraced Beds	Combe House, Gittisham	Walls and gate piers	17th century or earlier	27 January 1989	SY1439897936; 50°46′29″N 3°12′55″W	1098028	Upload Photo
Wild Court	Hawkchurch	House	Late 16th century	8 May 1967	ST3417800775; 50°48′10″N 2°56′08″W	1098497	Upload Photo
Church of St Michael	Honiton	Parish church	Late 15th century	1 June 1949	SY1669999905; 50°47′34″N 3°11′00″W	1306112	Church of St Michael More images
Manor House	Honiton	House	Probably 17th century	21 November 1957	ST1613500628; 50°47′57″N 3°11′29″W	1319754	Manor House More images
Marwood House	Honiton	House	1619	1 June 1949	ST1672200898; 50°48′06″N 3°10′59″W	1116982	Upload Photo
46 High Street	Honiton	House	18th century	1 June 1949	ST1646200740; 50°48′01″N 3°11′12″W	1319812	Upload Photo
39 and 41 New Street	Honiton	House	17th century or earlier	1 June 1949	ST1640300481; 50°47′52″N 3°11′15″W	1319884	Upload Photo
62 High Street	Honiton	House	Early 18th century	1 June 1949	ST1639900712; 50°48′00″N 3°11′16″W	1116675	Upload Photo
Church of St John the Baptist (now St Mary's)	Huxham	Parish church	1871	30 June 1961	SX9465097808; 50°46′13″N 3°29′43″W	1098307	Church of St John the Baptist (now St Mary's) More images
Church of St Giles	Kilmington	Parish church	15th century	8 May 1967	SY2730797984; 50°46′37″N 3°01′57″W	1098461	Church of St Giles More images
Greenway Farmhouse	Luppitt	Farmhouse	Probably 17th century	22 February 1955	ST1639205328; 50°50′29″N 3°11′20″W	1333672	Upload Photo
Mohuns Ottery Gatehouse and Front Garden Walls about 5m south of Mohuns Ottery Farmhouse	Luppitt	Gatehouse and walls	Gatehouse 16th century, walls 19th century	16 March 1988	ST1893005553; 50°50′38″N 3°09′10″W	1098265	Upload Photo
Pound Farmhouse Including Front Garden Walls	Luppitt	Farmhouse	c. 1670–90	16 March 1988	ST1846405193; 50°50′26″N 3°09′34″W	1098266	Upload Photo
Red Doors Farmhouse Including Front Courtyard Wall Adjoining to North	Beacon, Luppitt	Farmhouse	Early 16th century	16 March 1988	ST1796005071; 50°50′22″N 3°09′59″W	1307082	Upload Photo
Smithenhayes Farmhouse	Luppitt	Farmhouse	Late 16th to early 17th century	16 March 1988	ST1844104256; 50°49′55″N 3°09′34″W	1098226	Upload Photo
Stoneacre Farmhouse including Barn adjoining to the North-west and Front Garden Walls	Luppitt	Farmhouse	Early to mid 16th century	16 March 1988	ST1636606653; 50°51′12″N 3°11′22″W	1333696	Upload Photo
Church of the Nativity of the Blessed Virgin Mary	Lympstone	Parish church	Tower c. 1409	30 June 1961	SX9928884272; 50°38′58″N 3°25′33″W	1165089	Church of the Nativity of the Blessed Virgin Mary More images
Membury Court	Membury	Farmhouse	c. 16th century	8 May 1967	ST2638903785; 50°49′44″N 3°02′48″W	1170743	Upload Photo
Former Chapel Immediately North of Membury Court	Membury Court, Membury	Chapel	c. early 14th century	8 May 1967	ST2641003811; 50°49′45″N 3°02′47″W	1098473	Upload Photo
Lugg's Farmhouse Including Outbuilding Adjoining South East	Lugg's Farm, Membury	Farmhouse	c. 16th century	8 May 1967	ST2579806480; 50°51′11″N 3°03′20″W	1333598	Upload Photo
Church of St Mary Magdalene	Monkton	Parish church	15th century	22 February 1955	ST1874003106; 50°49′18″N 3°09′18″W	1333700	Church of St Mary Magdalene More images
Ashe House	Ashe House, Musbury	House	1669–83	11 September 1951	SY2768695958; 50°45′31″N 3°01′36″W	1170915	Upload Photo
Netherexe Barton	Nether Exe	Farmhouse	17th century	25 October 1984	SX9344699974; 50°47′22″N 3°30′47″W	1163920	Upload Photo
Church of St Gregory	Harpford, Newton Poppleford and Harpford	Parish church	Late 15th century	26 May 1987	SY0907690326; 50°42′20″N 3°17′20″W	1141405	Church of St Gregory More images
Church of St Gregory	Venn Ottery, Newton Poppleford and Harpford	Parish church	Tower 15th century	30 June 1961	SY0787191173; 50°42′46″N 3°18′23″W	1328749	Church of St Gregory More images
Church of St Luke	Newton Poppleford, Newton Poppleford and Harpford	Chapel of ease	15th century tower	30 June 1961	SY0856889710; 50°41′59″N 3°17′46″W	1281606	Church of St Luke More images
Conen Cottage & Oak Apple Cottage & Primrose Cottage & the Cottage	Station Rd, Newton Poppleford, Newton Poppleford and Harpford	House	Probably 17th century	30 June 1961	SY0877989758; 50°42′01″N 3°17′35″W	1141373	Upload Photo
Ham Cottage	Newton Poppleford, Newton Poppleford and Harpford	House	Early 16th century	11 November 1952	SY0876189738; 50°42′00″N 3°17′36″W	1141374	Upload Photo
Malthouse Cottage & St Marys Cottage	Newton Poppleford, Newton Poppleford and Harpford	House	16th to early 17th century	8 November 1984	SY0872489763; 50°42′01″N 3°17′38″W	1328747	Upload Photo
The Old Bakery	Newton Poppleford, Newton Poppleford and Harpford	House	16th to 17th century	11 November 1952	SY0877289738; 50°42′00″N 3°17′35″W	1328746	The Old Bakery
Church of St Giles	Northleigh	Parish church	Late 15th to early 16th century	22 February 1955	SY1958495873; 50°45′25″N 3°08′29″W	1333285	Church of St Giles More images
Basclose	Otterton	House	17th century	30 June 1961	SY0815885282; 50°39′36″N 3°18′03″W	1097486	Upload Photo
Church of St Michael	Otterton	Parish church	Tower late 11th century	30 June 1961	SY0799385165; 50°39′32″N 3°18′11″W	1281083	Church of St Michael More images
Otterton Mill including Mill Leat and Sluices to North	Otterton	Mill	Mid 19th century	11 November 1952	SY0798685235; 50°39′34″N 3°18′11″W	1334034	Otterton Mill including Mill Leat and Sluices to North More images
Passaford Farmhouse	Otterton	Farmhouse	Late 16th to early 17th century	10 February 1987	SY0904287651; 50°40′53″N 3°17′20″W	1097499	Passaford Farmhouse More images
Pavers Farmhouse including Garden Walls to South and East	Otterton	Farmhouse	Late 15th to early 16th century	10 February 1987	SY0897387657; 50°40′53″N 3°17′23″W	1205007	Upload Photo
Front Garden Wall of Knightstone	Wiggaton, Ottery St Mary	Wall	17th century	11 January 1974	SY1066694150; 50°44′24″N 3°16′03″W	1213783	Upload Photo
Hall's Farmhouse	Metcombe, Ottery St Mary	Farmhouse	Early 17th century or earlier	11 January 1974	SY0751192013; 50°43′13″N 3°18′42″W	1213329	Upload Photo
The Chanter's House	The College, Ottery St Mary	House	17th century	28 April 1952	SY0977895627; 50°45′12″N 3°16′49″W	1212841	Upload Photo
The Priory	Ottery St Mary	House	18th century	28 April 1952	SY0993295607; 50°45′11″N 3°16′41″W	1213372	Upload Photo
Leyhill	Payhembury	Farmhouse	Early 18th century	22 February 1955	ST0992602280; 50°48′47″N 3°16′48″W	1098151	Upload Photo
Lower House including Rear Garden Walls	Payhembury	Farmhouse	Mid to late 16th century	22 February 1955	ST0893501648; 50°48′26″N 3°17′38″W	1333702	Upload Photo
Agricultural Outbuildings adjoining to North of Woodbeer Court	Plymtree	Outbuildings	Early 18th century	24 October 1988	ST0657004019; 50°49′41″N 3°19′41″W	1098131	Upload Photo
Fordmoor Farmhouse including Front Garden Walls and Gate Piers	Plymtree	Manor house	Late 17th century	22 February 1955	ST0584003229; 50°49′15″N 3°20′17″W	1162543	Upload Photo
Little Clyst William Farmhouse	Plymtree	Farmhouse	Early to mid 16th century	24 October 1988	ST0662202698; 50°48′59″N 3°19′37″W	1098126	Upload Photo
Middle Clyst William Farmhouse	Plymtree	Farmhouse	Mid to late 15th century	22 February 1955	ST0683402716; 50°48′59″N 3°19′26″W	1098127	Upload Photo
Pencepool Farmhouse Including Service Outbuilding to Rear	Plymtree	Farmhouse	Early 16th century	6 October 1987	ST0525403122; 50°49′12″N 3°20′47″W	1098136	Upload Photo
Plymtree Manor	Plymtree	Manor house	Early 18th century	22 February 1955	ST0586602939; 50°49′06″N 3°20′16″W	1098129	Upload Photo
Woodbeer Court including Front Garden Walls Adjoining to South	Plymtree	Farmhouse	Late 15th to early 16th century	22 February 1955	ST0659103998; 50°49′41″N 3°19′40″W	1162634	Upload Photo
Poltimore House	Poltimore	House	Late 16th century	11 November 1952	SX9676796399; 50°45′29″N 3°27′54″W	1098310	Poltimore House More images
Paddleford Bridge	Rewe	Road bridge	c. 1700	30 June 1961	SX9521599808; 50°47′18″N 3°29′16″W	1171175	Upload Photo
Church of the Blessed Virgin Mary	Rockbeare	Parish church	Late 15th century	30 June 1961	SY0202695261; 50°44′55″N 3°23′24″W	1203864	Church of the Blessed Virgin Mary More images
Gate Piers and Gates approximately 350 Metres North West of Rockbeare Manor	Rockbeare	Gate	Piers mid 18th century, gates c. 1820	26 May 1987	SY0299094393; 50°44′28″N 3°22′34″W	1141388	Gate Piers and Gates approximately 350 Metres North West of Rockbeare Manor More images
Stables and Coach Houses Approximately 10 Metres East of Rockbeare Manor	Rockbeare	Stables and house	Probably mid 18th century	26 May 1987	SY0320394021; 50°44′16″N 3°22′23″W	1141386	Upload Photo
Lower Northcott Farmhouse	Sheldon	Farmhouse	Mid 17th century	27 January 1989	ST1196109112; 50°52′29″N 3°15′10″W	1205128	Upload Photo
Old Sheldon Grange	Sheldon	Farmhouse	Late 15th to early 16th century	2 July 1987	ST1295409766; 50°52′51″N 3°14′19″W	1098251	Upload Photo
Church of St Michael	Shute	Parish church	13th century	8 May 1967	SY2527997451; 50°46′19″N 3°03′40″W	1171002	Church of St Michael More images
Shute House	Shute	Country house	1790	8 May 1967	SY2556996978; 50°46′03″N 3°03′25″W	1171008	Shute House More images
Audley	Sidmouth	Cottage orné	c. 1810	11 November 1970	SY1231587636; 50°40′54″N 3°14′33″W	1098005	Upload Photo
Aurora & Church House	Sidmouth	House	c. 1820	12 October 1951	SY1243887398; 50°40′47″N 3°14′26″W	1097959	Upload Photo
Beach House	Sidmouth	Villa	c. 1820	12 October 1951	SY1265787247; 50°40′42″N 3°14′15″W	1097933	Beach House More images
Bedford Hotel	Sidmouth	Library	c. 1810	12 October 1951	SY1250387209; 50°40′41″N 3°14′23″W	1097931	Bedford Hotel More images
Church of St Giles with St Nicholas	Sidmouth	Parish church	Late medieval tower	12 October 1951	SY1255487374; 50°40′46″N 3°14′21″W	1333807	Church of St Giles with St Nicholas More images
Church of St Mary and St Peter	Salcombe Regis, Sidmouth	Parish church	Late medieval	12 October 1951	SY1483288834; 50°41′34″N 3°12′26″W	1216101	Church of St Mary and St Peter More images
Coburg Terrace	Sidmouth	House	c. 1830	12 October 1951	SY1244787456; 50°40′49″N 3°14′26″W	1097956	Upload Photo
Little Cob & Merton Cottage & Tudor Cottage	Sidmouth	Row	c. 1500	12 February 1973	SY1253387290; 50°40′43″N 3°14′22″W	1333802	Upload Photo
Manstone Old House	Sidmouth	Farmhouse	Medieval	12 October 1951	SY1264489416; 50°41′52″N 3°14′18″W	1287980	Upload Photo
Sand	Sidbury, Sidmouth	House	1594	12 October 1951	SY1470992516; 50°43′34″N 3°12′35″W	1287811	Sand More images
Sand Lodge	Sand, Sidbury, Sidmouth	Outbuilding	1600	12 October 1951	SY1467692524; 50°43′34″N 3°12′37″W	1287812	Upload Photo
Sidholme	Sidmouth	Villa	1826	12 November 1973	SY1254888067; 50°41′08″N 3°14′21″W	1097928	Upload Photo
St David's	Sidmouth	Terraced house	1800	12 October 1951	SY1234587315; 50°40′44″N 3°14′31″W	1097908	Upload Photo
Church of St Lawrence	Southleigh	Parish church	15th century	22 February 1955	SY2047493403; 50°44′05″N 3°07′42″W	1252576	Church of St Lawrence More images
Wiscombe Park	Southleigh	Country house	1826	22 February 1955	SY1862593057; 50°43′53″N 3°09′16″W	1318004	Wiscombe Park More images
Lychgate 15 Metres South-east of Sowton Parish Church	Sowton	Lychgate	c. 1852	19 March 1987	SX9759792494; 50°43′23″N 3°27′08″W	1164889	Lychgate 15 Metres South-east of Sowton Parish Church
Broadhayes House	Broadhayes House, Stockland	House	Mid 18th century	8 May 1967	ST2337602527; 50°49′02″N 3°05′21″W	1305771	Upload Photo
Lower Lye	Lower Lye, Stockland	Farmhouse	c. early 16th century	19 October 1984	ST2476805557; 50°50′41″N 3°04′12″W	1171239	Upload Photo
Townsend Farm House	Stockland	Farmhouse	c. early 16th century	8 May 1967	ST2454504692; 50°50′13″N 3°04′23″W	1171316	Upload Photo
Stoke Canon Bridge and Causeway	Stoke Canon	Road bridge	Probably 15th century	7 March 1990	SX9380897526; 50°46′03″N 3°30′26″W	1253020	Stoke Canon Bridge and Causeway More images
Harris's Farmhouse	Talaton	Farmhouse	1687	24 October 1988	SY0680599772; 50°47′24″N 3°19′25″W	1098111	Harris's Farmhouse More images
Hawthorn Cottage	Talaton	House	Late 17th century	22 February 1955	SY0833997725; 50°46′19″N 3°18′05″W	1098100	Upload Photo
Stoney Court	Talaton	House	Late 15th to early 16th century	24 October 1988	SY0670199585; 50°47′18″N 3°19′30″W	1333754	Stoney Court More images
Talaton Farm Cottage & Talaton Farmhouse	Talaton	Farmhouse	Late 15th to early 16th century	24 October 1988	SY0764697864; 50°46′23″N 3°18′40″W	1098105	Talaton Farm Cottage & Talaton Farmhouse
The Old Manor	Talaton	Farmhouse	Late 15th to early 16th century	22 February 1955	SY0679799670; 50°47′21″N 3°19′25″W	1333753	Upload Photo
Church of St Peter and St Paul	Uplyme	Parish church	15th century	8 May 1967	SY3249693511; 50°44′14″N 2°57′29″W	1333613	Church of St Peter and St Paul More images
Charleshayes Farmhouse	Upottery	Farmhouse	Late 15th to early 16th century	16 March 1988	ST2122808920; 50°52′28″N 3°07′15″W	1168491	Upload Photo
Church of St Mary the Virgin	Upottery	Parish church	15th century	22 February 1955	ST2019807546; 50°51′43″N 3°08′07″W	1168979	Church of St Mary the Virgin More images
Cowley Bridge	Cowley, Upton Pyne	Road bridge	1813–14	29 January 1953	SX9073395502; 50°44′56″N 3°33′01″W	1164147	Cowley Bridge More images
Pynes	Upton Pyne	House	c. 1700–1725	11 November 1952	SX9141296350; 50°45′24″N 3°32′27″W	1097597	Pynes More images
Church of St Mary	Whimple	Parish church	16th century	30 June 1961	SY0441797207; 50°46′00″N 3°21′24″W	1163149	Church of St Mary More images
Fordton Farmhouse	Whimple	Farmhouse	Early 16th century	15 November 1982	SY0416497528; 50°46′10″N 3°21′37″W	1098081	Upload Photo
Lower Woodhayes Farmhouse	Whimple	Farmhouse	Early 16th century	24 October 1988	SY0478796662; 50°45′42″N 3°21′05″W	1333756	Upload Photo
Church of St Cuthbert	Widworthy	Parish church	Mid to late 14th century	22 February 1955	SY2142299288; 50°47′16″N 3°06′58″W	1317948	Church of St Cuthbert More images
Cookshayes Farmhouse Including Gate Piers Adjoining to South	Widworthy	Farmhouse	Late 16th to early 17th century	22 February 1955	SY2102997529; 50°46′19″N 3°07′17″W	1163959	Upload Photo
Old Triffords Farmhouse	Widworthy	Farmhouse	Early to mid 16th century	6 October 1987	SY2252899218; 50°47′14″N 3°06′01″W	1104100	Old Triffords Farmhouse
Stockers Farmhouse	Widworthy	Farmhouse	Early to mid 16th century	8 March 1988	SY2121497210; 50°46′09″N 3°07′07″W	1104101	Upload Photo
Widworthy Barton	Widworthy	Manor house	Early 17th century	22 February 1955	SY2136699252; 50°47′15″N 3°07′01″W	1164128	Widworthy Barton More images
Brown's Farmhouse	Woodbury Salterton, Woodbury	Farmhouse	c. 1700	11 November 1952	SY0149288472; 50°41′15″N 3°23′45″W	1104166	Upload Photo
Exton Farmhouse	Exton, Woodbury	Farmhouse	Early to mid 17th century	11 November 1952	SX9844686454; 50°40′08″N 3°26′18″W	1104187	Upload Photo
Exton House	Exton, Woodbury	Farmhouse	Late 16th century	24 May 1976	SX9842086441; 50°40′07″N 3°26′20″W	1333278	Upload Photo
Former Indoor Riding School 10 Metres South-west of Nutwell Home Farm	Lympstone, Woodbury	Riding school	c. 1800	21 April 1986	SX9875785264; 50°39′30″N 3°26′01″W	1104156	Upload Photo
Nutwell Court	Lympstone, Woodbury	Country house	18th century	11 November 1952	SX9878085035; 50°39′22″N 3°26′00″W	1333302	Nutwell Court More images
2 and 3 The Green	Woodbury	Cruck house	Early 17th century	21 April 1986	SY0101787165; 50°40′33″N 3°24′08″W	1333280	Upload Photo
Livenhayes Farmhouse	Yarcombe	Farmhouse	Probably early 16th century	22 February 1955	ST2386607384; 50°51′39″N 3°04′59″W	1333714	Livenhayes Farmhouse
North Waterhayne Farmhouse	Yarcombe	Farmhouse	Early 16th century	22 February 1955	ST2557508317; 50°52′10″N 3°03′33″W	1169407	Upload Photo
Sheafhayne Manor including Terraces on All Sides and Outbuildings Adjoining to North	Yarcombe	Manor house	16th century, rebuilt 19th century	22 February 1955	ST2572309287; 50°52′42″N 3°03′26″W	1333716	Upload Photo
Underdown Farmhouse including Front Garden Boundary Walls	Yarcombe	Farmhouse	Late 15th to early 16th century	16 March 1988	ST2389707764; 50°51′52″N 3°04′58″W	1169539	Underdown Farmhouse including Front Garden Boundary Walls

== See also ==
- Grade I listed buildings in East Devon
