= East Budleigh Hundred =

Ancient administrative unit of Devon, England

The hundred of East Budleigh was the name of one of thirty two ancient administrative units of Devon, England.

The parishes in the hundred were: Aylesbeare; Bicton; Clyst Honiton; Clyst St George; Clyst St Mary; Colaton Raleigh; Dotton; East Budleigh; Farringdon; Gittisham; Harpford; Littleham (near Exmouth); Lympstone; Newton Poppleford; Otterton; Rockbeare; Salcombe Regis; Sidbury; Sidmouth; Venn Ottery; Withycombe Raleigh and Woodbury.

== See also ==
- List of hundreds of England and Wales - Devon
