= Manor of Otterton =

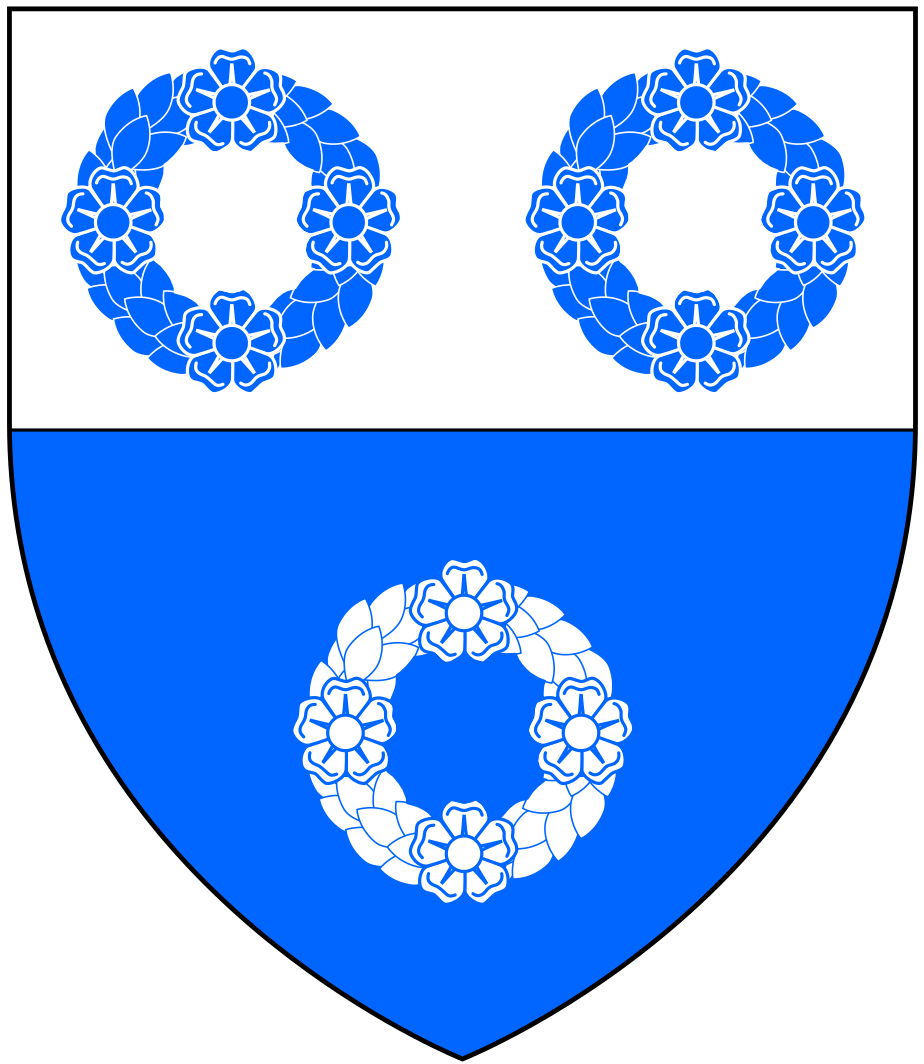
Arms of Duke family of Otterton: Per fesse argent and azure, three chaplets counterchanged

The Manor of Otterton was a medieval manor in East Devon, England.

== Descent of the manor ==
The church at Otterton, dedicated to St Michael, belonged to the monastery of Mont Saint-Michel at the time of the Domesday Book in 1086. After passing through ownership by Syon Abbey in the 15th century, the manor with the advowson was bought by Richard Duke (c. 1515–1572) at the Dissolution of the Monasteries. Duke converted some of the monastic buildings into a mansion, part of which still exists to the north of the present-day church, which was rebuilt in 1869–71 at the sole expense of Lady Rolle to the design of Benjamin Ferrey. In 1786 the manor of Otterton, with several other manors, was sold by the heirs of the Duke family for the huge sum of £72,000 to Denys Rolle (1725–1797) of nearby Bicton, and of Stevenstone, the largest landowner in Devon.

The descent of the manor of Otterton was as follows:

=== Duke ===
==== Richard Duke (c. 1515–1572) ====
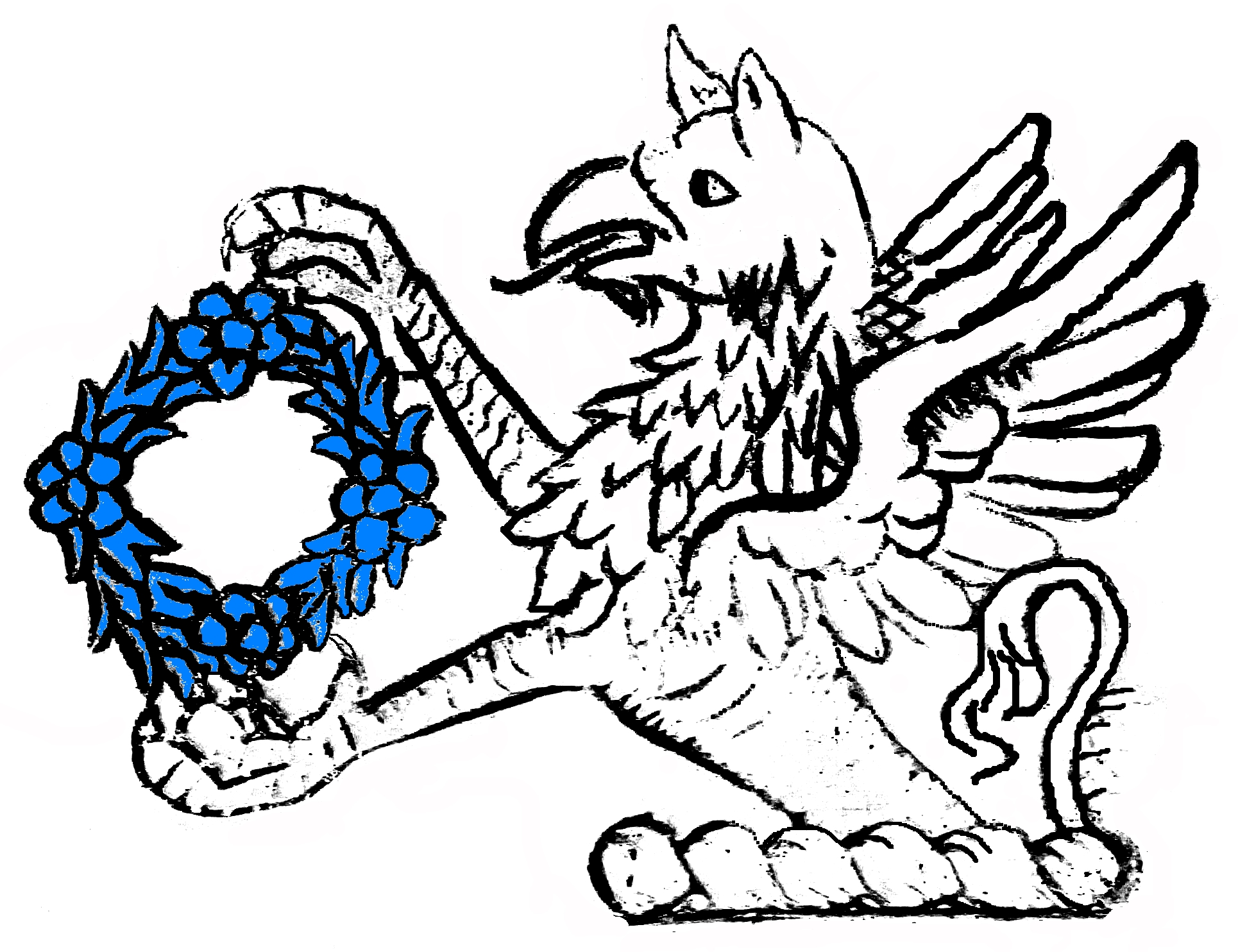
Crest of Duke: A demi-griffin salient argent, holding in its dexter claw a chaplet azure. Depiction incised on monumental brass of Duke's great-nephew Richard Duke (1567–1641), Otterton Church

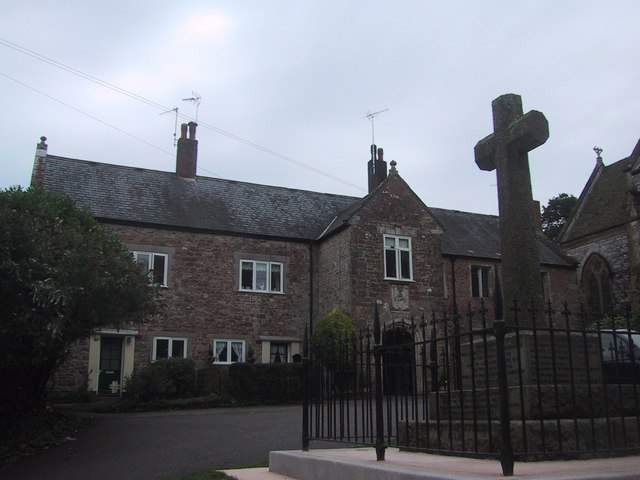
Remains of Otterton Priory, used as the residence of the Duke family, whose arms are sculpted in stone on the porch above the door

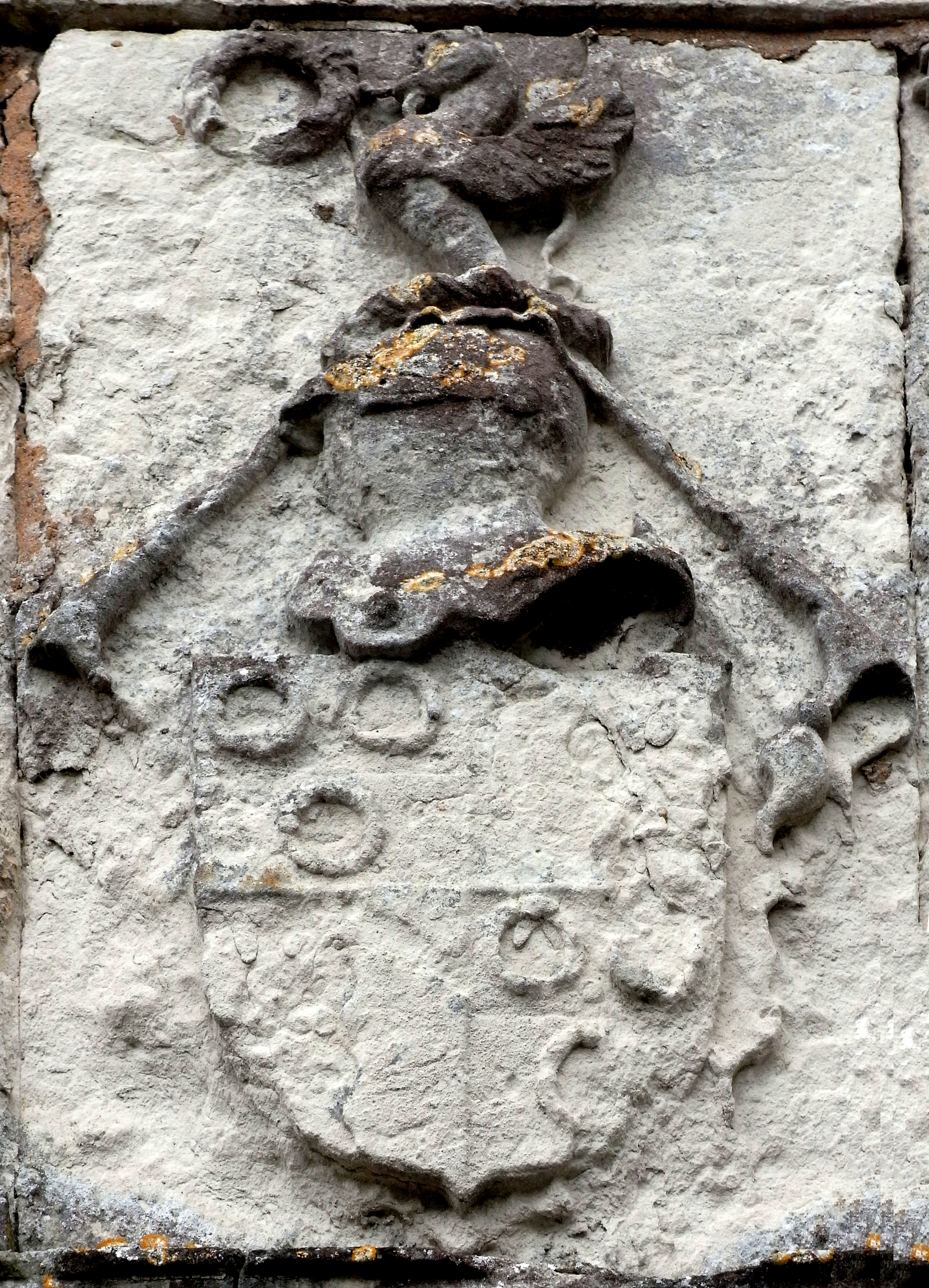
Arms of Duke family sculpted on porch of Otterton Priory. The arms of Duke (Per fesse argent and azure, three chaplets counterchanged) occupy the 1st & 4th quarters, but the arms in the 2nd & 3rd quarters are now worn away by age. They are said to be the arms of William Duke (mayor of Exeter in 1460) quartered with those of Poer (Per pale wavy azure and or), the family of his wife Cecily Poer, daughter and heiress of Roger Poer of Powershayes. The crest of Duke on the helm above is A demi-griffin salient argent, holding in its dexter claw a chaplet azure. These arms can be seen more clearly on the two 17th century monumental brasses now on the west wall of Otterton parish church

Following the Dissolution of the Monasteries the manor with the advowson, formerly the property of Otterton Priory, was purchased on 5 February 1540 from the crown (whose agent for such ex-monastic land sales was the Court of Augmentations) by Richard Duke (c. 1515–1572), Clerk of the Court of Augmentations, MP for Weymouth in 1545 and for Dartmouth in 1547 and Sheriff of Devon in 1563–64. His position thus gave him an advantage in bidding for ex-monastic lands. The purchase comprised a large part of the country surrounding the estuary and lower course of the River Otter. He made Otterton Priory his home and it continued as the principal residence of the Duke family, which held the estate until 1786 when it was sold to Denys Rolle (1725–1797) of Bicton, thus making him eventually the largest landowner in Devon. The estate remains largely intact as the core landholding of Baron Clinton's 55,000-acre Devon estate, whose family was the heir of the Rolles. The catalogue entry of the record of the grant in the Patent Rolls is summarised as follows:

To Richard Duke and Elizabeth his wife, granting in fee, for £1,727.14.2. the manors of Otterton and Budlegh alias East Budlegh, which belonged to the late Monastery of St. Saviour and Saints Mary and Bridget, Syon, Middlesex; the advowsons of the vicarages of Otterton and Harpford alias Harford and Fen Ottery; and the churches and rectories of Otterton and Harpeford, and all lands etc. in Otterton, Normeston, Houghton, Pasford, Patteston, alias Pytteston, Harpeford alias Harford, Fen Otery, Otterton, Bykton and Budleigh alias East Budleigh belonging to the late monastery; also, the Water of Oter with the fishery of the same, the free warren, view of frankpledge and wreck of the sea in Otterton and Budleigh and all messuages, lands, etc. in Otterton, East Budleigh, Budleigh, Pasford, Houghton, Patteston alias Pytteston, Normeston, Pynne, Stouton, Bykton, Harpeford alias Harford, Fen Otery, Saltern, Tudwill, Polehaye Knoll and Daldyche etc., as Agnes Jorden late Abbess of the said monastery formerly held. Rent: £9. 12s. Great Seal, in green wax, broken.

In 1542 he acquired the manor of Templecombe in Somerset and in 1544 Brownsea Island in Dorset. In 1546 with his brother John Duke he acquired Collaton Abbot, Devon and received by royal grant for himself Upper Budleigh and with his brother other manors in Devon and Somerset. In 1550 Duke purchased from Sir Andrew Dudley, KG (c. 1507–1559), the "lordships and Manors of Bishops Teignton, Radway and West "Teyngmouth" and the rectories and church of Bishops Teignton and Radway". A chief rent of £20 was payable to Dudley after the death of "John, Bishop of Exeter", presumably Bishop John Vesey (died 1554). The purchase included the manor of "Lyndrygge" (Lindridge House). Richard Duke's eventual heir was his nephew Richard Duke (died 1607).

==== Richard Duke (died 1607) ====
Richard Duke (died 1607), nephew, son of his brother John Duke "of Pinne", (now Pinn Barton Farm about 3 miles NE of Otterton) who thus inherited Otterton and his other lands. Richard Duke married twice: firstly to Martha Parker (died 1583), daughter of John Parker, a merchant of London; and secondly to Katherine Prideaux, the daughter of John Prideaux (died 1558) of Nutwell, MP for Devon in 1554 and sergeant-at-law. A monument thought to date from the late 16th century survives in Woodbury Church showing on a tomb chest two recumbent figures said to be of a Prideaux and his wife.

==== Richard Duke (1567–1641) ====
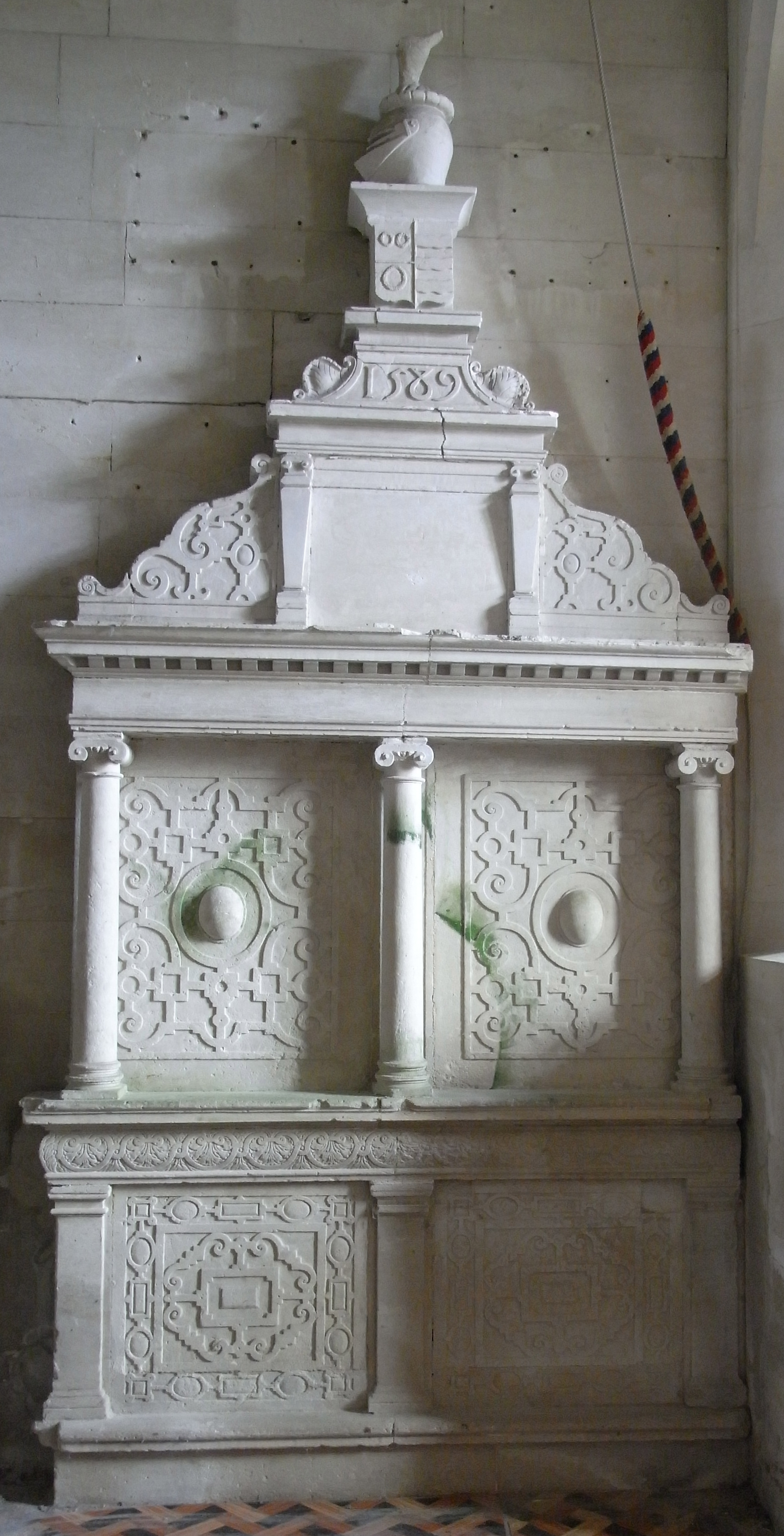
1589 strapwork monument in Otterton Church to Richard Duke (1567–1641) and his wife Margaret Bassett. On top are the arms of Duke impaling Bassett, with the Duke crest above, mutilated

Arms of Basset of Heanton Punchardon and Umberleigh, Devon and Tehidy, Cornwall: Barry wavy of six or and gules

Richard Duke (1567 – 19 April 1641), son and heir by father's first marriage. His monumental brass plaque survives in Otterton Church. He married Margaret Bassett (died 1619), a daughter of Sir Arthur Bassett (1541–1586), MP, of Umberleigh, Devon (whose chest tomb exists in Atherington Church), by his wife Eleanor Chichester. An elaborate stone monument sculpted with strapwork decoration, showing the prominent date "1589" exists against the east wall in the south transept of Otterton Church. At its top it shows the arms of Duke impaling Bassett, with the Duke crest above, mutilated. The date 1589 appears to refer to the date of their marriage.

===== Brass coffin-plate =====
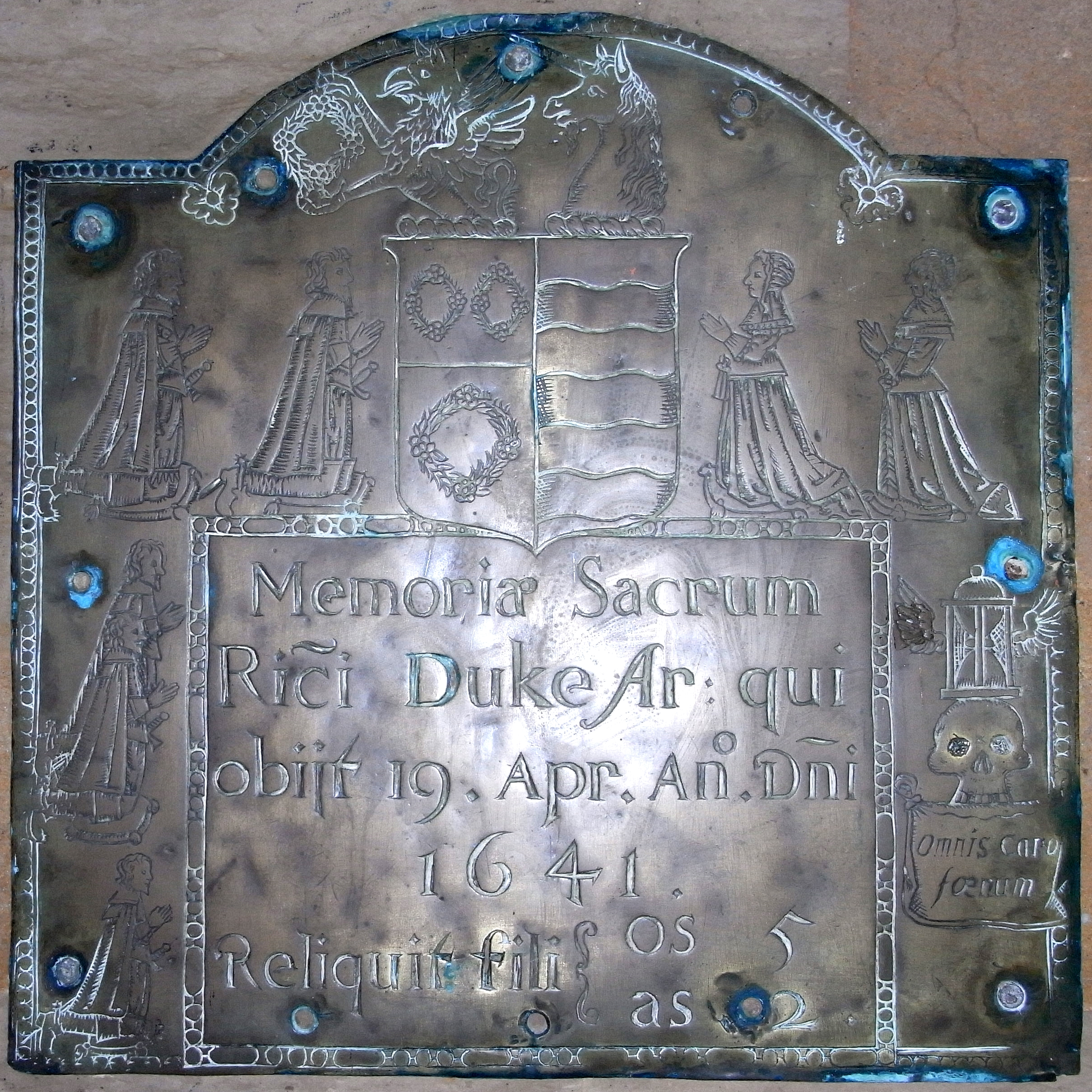
Brass coffin-plate of Richard Duke (1567–1641), Otterton Church

A monumental brass coffin plate of Richard Duke (1567–1641) survives in Otterton Church, now affixed to the west wall, originally affixed to his coffin within the Duke family vault in the church. The Latin inscription is as follows:

Memoriae sacrum Ric(ard)i Duke Ar(migeri) qui obiit 19 Apr(ilis) An(n)o D(omi)ni 1641. reliquit filios 5, filias 2. ("Sacred to the memory of Richard Duke, Esquire, who died (on the) 19th of April in the year of our Lord 1641. He left sons 5, daughters 2").

At the top is an escutcheon with the arms of Duke impaling Basset ( barry wavy of six or and gules), with the crests of the respective families above (Basset crest: A unicorn's head and neck couped argent). On the left of the shield are shown his 5 sons, kneeling, and to the right his 2 daughters also kneeling. In the right margin, under a winged hourglass, is a human skull holding in its teeth a cloth inscribed: Omnis caro foenum ("All flesh is grass" (Isiah 40:6)). His sons included the following, of whom it is presumed only five survived childhood:

- Richard Duke (died 1653), eldest son and heir.
- Robert Duke (1600–1665), 2nd son, who married Sarah Reynell, daughter of Richard Reynell of Creedy Widger (by his wife Mary Periam) and co-heiress of her brother Periam Reynell (died 1639). Her brass coffin plate survives, now affixed to the west wall of Otterton Church.
- Arthur Duke, 3rd son
- Humphrie Duke, 4th son, Vicar of Harpford
- Basset Duke, 5th son
- Thomas Duke (1616–1653), 6th son
- John Duke, 7th son (born 1619)

His daughters were:

- Elizabeth Duke (born 1607), wife of Henry Morgan
- Frances Duke, wife of William Carmynowe of Trehannick, Cornwall.

==== Richard Duke (1600–1653) ====
Richard Duke (died 1653), eldest son and heir.

==== Richard Duke (died 1716) ====
Richard Duke (died 1716), son and heir, who married Frances Southcott, daughter of George Southcote of Buckland-Tout-Saints. In an apparent effort to facilitate the re-election of his son as its MP, in 1681 he purchased a moiety of the manor and borough of Ashburton "at the commanding persuasion" of Sir William Courtenay, 1st Baronet, of Powderham, from Hon. Lewis Watson (1655–1724), MP.

==== Richard Duke (1652–1733) ====
Richard Duke (1652–1733), son and heir, four times MP for Ashburton, 1679, 1695, 1698 and 1701. He married twice:

- Firstly to Isabella Yonge, daughter of Sir Walter Yonge, 2nd Baronet (c. 1625–1670), of Colyton, MP, by whom he had an only daughter and heir presumptive Elizabeth Duke (died 1716), whose marriage was arranged in 1705 to Robert Rolle (c. 1677–1710), MP for Callington (twice in 1701) and for Devon (1702–1710), heir apparent to his grandfather Sir John Rolle (1626–1706), KB, of Stevenstone and Bicton, Devon. This was destined to be a great dynastic marriage which would have combined two of the largest estates in Devon, yet the marriage was childless and thus the plan failed. The Rolle estate of Bicton was adjacent to Otterton, and thus the combination of the two would be advantageous from the administrative viewpoint. The Rolles did not however give up their desire to obtain Otterton, and further dynastic alliances (also failed) were arranged between the two families. The Rolle desire was fulfilled in 1786 when Denys Rolle (1725–1797) purchased for the huge sum of £72,000 the manor of Otterton, with several other manors, from the heirs of his brother-in-law the last Robert Duke (died 1741) of Otterton, who had married his sister Isabella Charlotte Rolle, which marriage was without issue.
- Secondly he married Elizabeth Cholwich, daughter of John Cholwich of Farringdon, by whom he had two children who died as infants:
  - Robert Duke (1712–1714)
  - Frances Duke (1707–1711)

==== Richard Duke (1688–1740) ====
Richard Duke (1688–1740), second cousin once removed, heir to Otterton under the will of the childless Richard Duke (1652–1733). He was the second son of Richard Duke (born 1653) by his wife Isabella, the son and heir of Richard Duke (born 1627), the son and heir of Robert Duke (1600–1665), the younger brother of Richard Duke (1600–1653) of Otterton. He died unmarried, when his heir became successively:

- John Heath, his nephew, (who assumed the name and arms of Duke), MP for Honiton 1747–1754 and 1761–1768. He died childless.
- Robert Duke (died 1741) of Otterton, who succeeded to the Duke estates.

==== Robert Duke (died 1741) ====
Robert Duke (died 1741) of Otterton, nephew and eventual heir of Richard Duke (1688–1740). He was the son of George Duke (died before 1736) of Colaton Raleigh (eldest brother of Richard Duke (1688–1740)) by his wife Dorothy Ayre (1685–1757). He married Isabella Charlotte Rolle, sister of Denys Rolle (1725–1797) of Bicton and Stevenstone, but the marriage was childless. His co-heirs became (in their issue) his five sisters:

- Dorothy Duke (died 1785), 1st sister, wife firstly of John Conant of Wolbrooke, Sidmouth; secondly wife of Richard Doidge of Elford Leigh, Plympton St Mary.
- Sarah Duke, 2nd sister, died unmarried
- Elizabeth Duke, 3rd sister, who married in 1746 Rev. John Yonge of Puslinch, Devon.
- Anne Duke, 4th sister, died unmarried.
- Frances Duke, 5th sister, who in 1753 married Bernard Frederick Taylor, a merchant of the City of London of Islington, Middlesex. She had three children:
  - George Duke Taylor of Otterton, only son
  - Dorothy Ayre Taylor (died 1831), who married Henry Langford Brown (1721–1800) of Combe Satchfield
  - Frances Duke Taylor (died 1838), who in 1788 married Col. James Coleridge (1759–1836) of Ottery St Mary, the brother of the poet Samuel Taylor Coleridge (1772–1834), sons of Reverend John Coleridge (1718–1781), Vicar of Ottery St Mary. Her grandson was John Coleridge, 1st Baron Coleridge (1820–1894), Lord Chief Justice of England.

=== Rolle ===
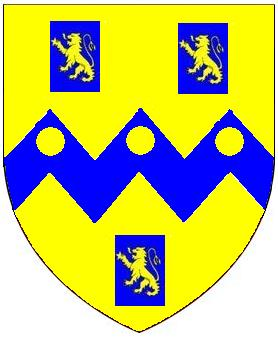
Arms of Rolle: Or, on a fesse dancetté between three billets azure each charged with a lion rampant of the first three bezants

==== Denys Rolle (1725–1797) ====
In 1786 the manor of Otterton, with several other manors, was sold by the heirs of the Duke family for the huge sum of £72,000 to Denys Rolle (1725–1797) of nearby Bicton, and of Stevenstone, the largest landowner in Devon. The properties acquired from the Duke family in this transaction included:

Capital messuage, barton farm and demesne lands of Otterton and the manors and lordships of Otterton, Little Otterton, Budleigh Poleslow otherwise Higher Budleigh, Budleigh Syon otherwise Lower Budleigh, Collaton Rawleigh otherwise the Lower Manor, Dukes-Collaton, otherwise Collaton Abbott otherwise The Higher Manor, Dotton otherwise Docton and Hays otherwise Powershays otherwise Dukes Hayes; 4 water grist mills in Otterton and the advowsons of the churches of Otterton Budleigh, and Harpford with the free chapels of Withecombe, Fen Ottery rectory and Sheaf of Otterton and a fee farm rent of £13. 10s., payable out of the sheaf of Sidmouth, etc.

==== John Rolle, 1st Baron Rolle (1750–1842) ====
John Rolle, 1st Baron Rolle (1750–1842), eldest son. He married twice: firstly to Judith Maria Walrond, daughter and heiress of William Walrond of Bovey House, Beer, Devon; secondly to Louisa Trefusis (1794–1885), daughter of Robert George William Trefusis, 17th Baron Clinton (1764–1797). In her widowhood Lady Rolle rebuilt Otterton Church at her sole expense, and also rebuilt nearby Bicton Church. He made his heir the nephew of his second wife, namely the Hon. Mark George Kerr Trefusis (1836–1907), the younger brother of Charles Hepburn-Stuart-Forbes-Trefusis, 20th Baron Clinton (1834–1904), who adopted the name Hon. Mark Rolle, with the Rolle arms.

==== Mark Rolle (1836–1907) ====
Hon. Mark Rolle (1836–1907), adoptive heir, who died without male children, when the Rolle estates, including Otterton, were inherited by his nephew Charles John Robert Hepburn-Stuart-Forbes-Trefusis, 21st Baron Clinton (1863–1957), who sold many of the estates to meet inheritance taxes.

=== Baron Clinton ===
Charles John Robert Hepburn-Stuart-Forbes-Trefusis, 21st Baron Clinton (1863–1957), nephew. See Clinton Devon Estates.
