= Richard Duke (English lawyer) =

British lawyer and politician

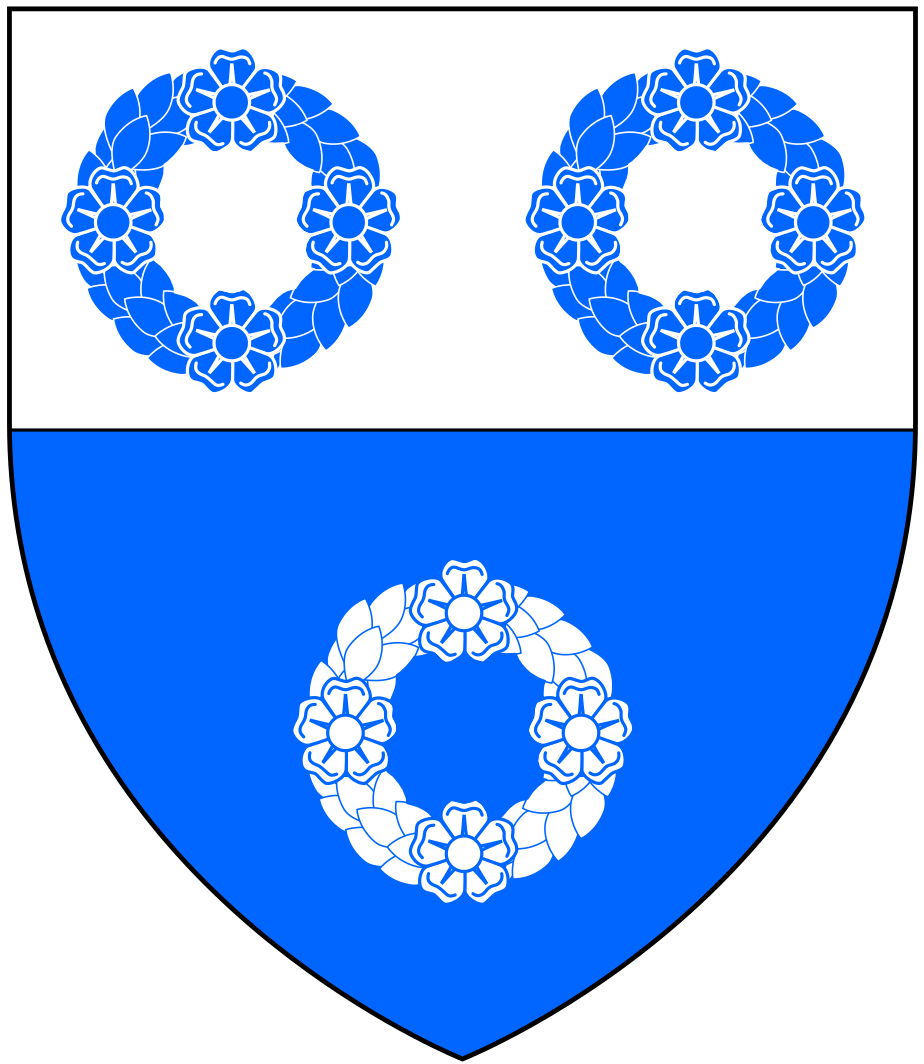
- Armorial of Duke family of Otterton: Per fesse argent and azure, three chaplets counterchanged

Sheriff of Devon
- In office 1563-1564

Member of Parliament for Dartmouth
- In office 1547

Member of Parliament for Weymouth
- In office 1545

Personal details
- Born: c. 1515
- Died: 8 September 1572 (aged 56–57)
- Spouse(s): Elizabeth Franke; Joan Hoby
- Children: 2

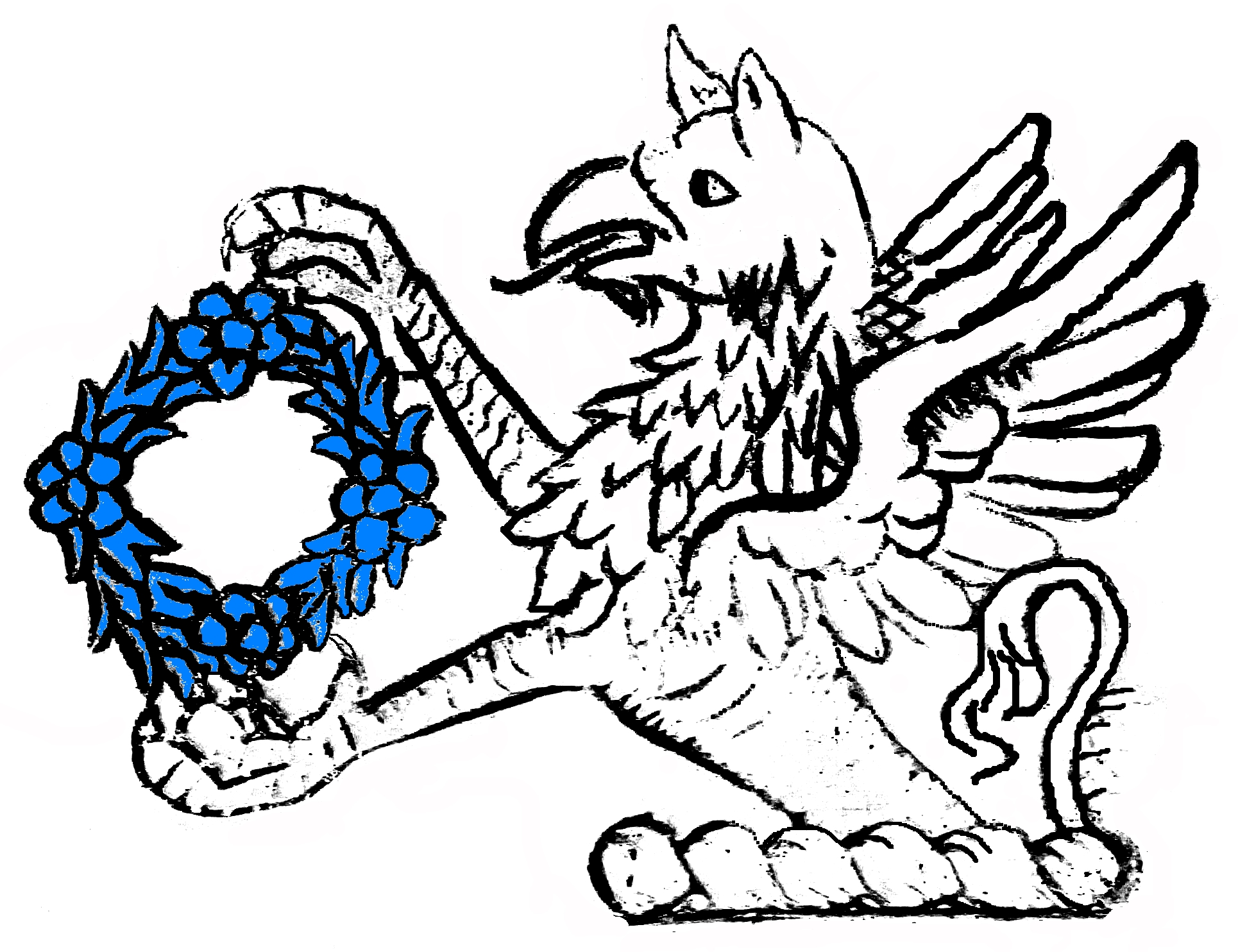
Crest of Duke: A demi-griffin salient argent, holding in its dexter claw a chaplet azure. Depiction incised on monumental brass of Duke's great-nephew Richard III Duke (1567–1641), Otterton Church

Richard Duke (c. 1515 – 1572) was a lawyer and served as Clerk of the Court of Augmentations which position assisted him in acquiring large grants of former monastic lands in the West Country following the dissolution of the monasteries. He served as MP for Weymouth in 1545 and for Dartmouth in 1547 and as Sheriff of Devon in 1563–64.

== Origins ==
He was the eldest son of Henry Duke, son of a merchant of Exeter, Devon, by his wife Maud White, daughter of Roger White. The Duke family had been settled at Otterton in south Devon from the time of King Edward III (1327–1377).

== Career ==
He studied law at the Inner Temple where he was admitted on 8 February 1533. In 1536 the Court of Augmentations was established by King Henry VIII to manage the properties reverting to the crown following the dissolution of the monasteries and Duke was appointed for life as Clerk of the Court of Augmentations, which position he held until the court's abolition in 1554, upon which he was compensated for his loss of office with an annuity of £133 6s 8d.

== Land purchases ==
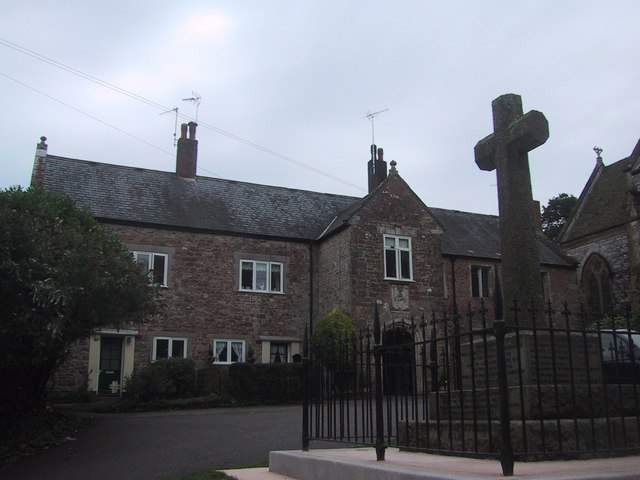
Remains of Otterton Priory, used as the residence of the Duke family, whose arms are sculpted in stone on the porch above the door

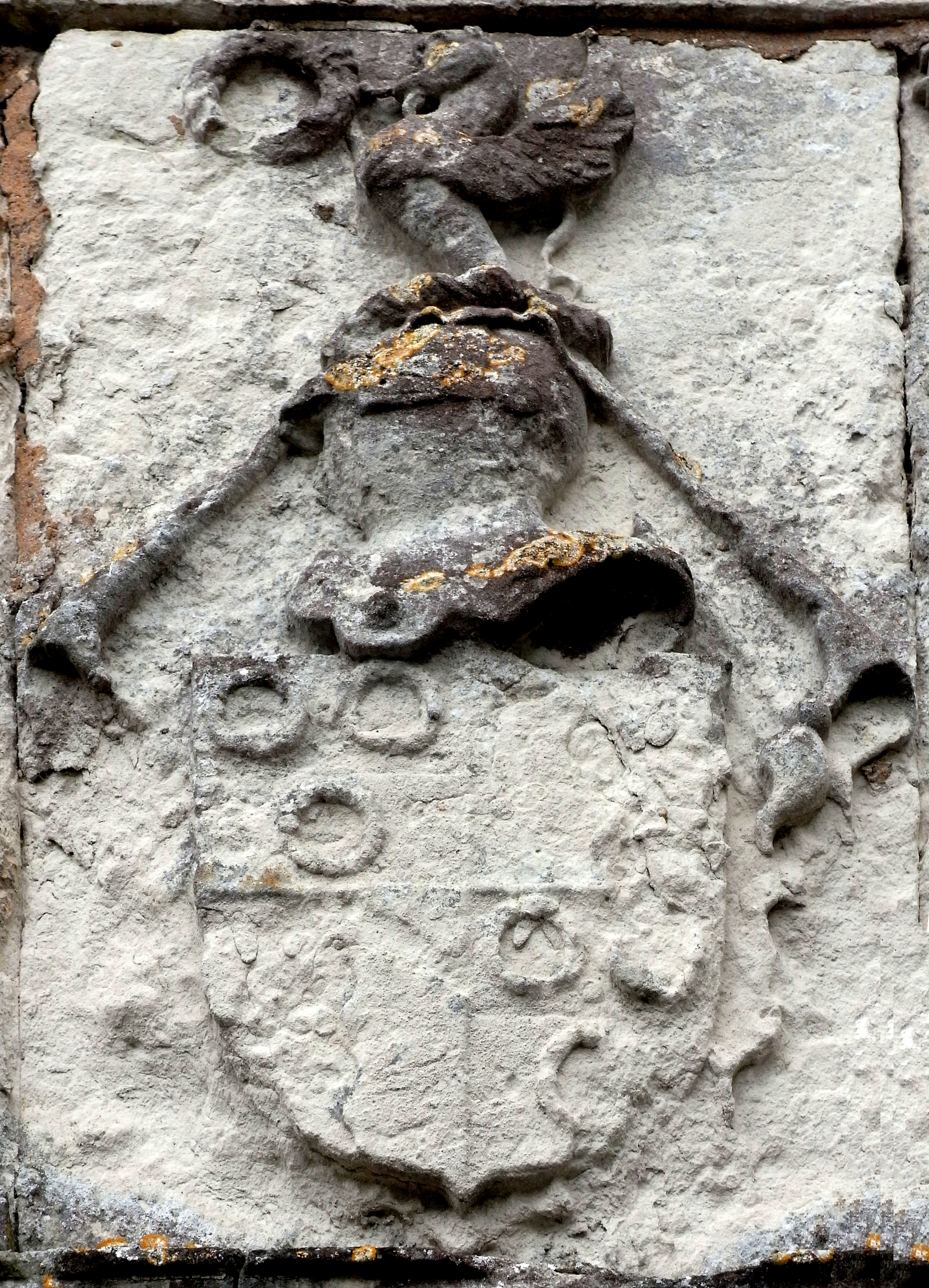
Arms of Duke family sculpted on porch of Otterton Priory. The arms of Duke (Per fesse argent and azure, three chaplets counterchanged) occupy the 1st & 4th quarters, but the arms in the 2nd & 3rd quarters are now worn away by age. They are said to be the arms of William Duke (mayor of Exeter in 1460) quartered with those of Poer (Per pale wavy azure and or), the family of his wife Cecily Poer, daughter and heiress of Roger Poer of Powershayes. The crest of Duke on the helm above is A demi-griffin salient argent, holding in its dexter claw a chaplet azure. These arms can be seen more clearly on the two 17th century monumental brasses now on the west wall of Otterton parish church

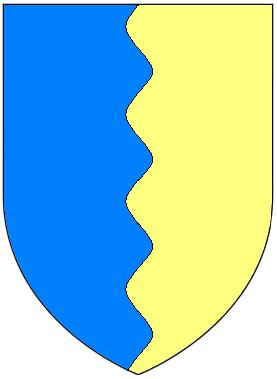
Arms of Poer (or Power) family of Hayes, East Budleigh (15th century), later quartered by Duke family of Otterton, as formerly visible on porch of Otterton Priory: Per pale wavy azure and or

Almost immediately following his appointment as Clerk of the Court of Augmentations he acquired his first grant of former monastic lands when in December 1536 he was granted a lease of Pilton Priory in north Devon. On 5 February 1540 he made a larger acquisition when he purchased the lands of the dissolved Otterton Priory near the south Devon coast, which comprised a large part of the country surrounding the estuary and lower course of the River Otter. He made Otterton Priory his home and it continued as the principal residence of the Duke family, which held the estate until 1786 when it was sold to Denys Rolle of Bicton, thus making him eventually the largest landowner in Devon. The estate remains largely intact as the core landholding of Baron Clinton's 55,000-acre Devon estate, whose family was the heir of the Rolles. The catalogue entry of the record of the grant in the Patent Rolls is summarised as follows:

To Richard Duke and Elizabeth his wife, granting in fee, for £1,727.14.2. the manors of Otterton and Budlegh alias East Budlegh, which belonged to the late Monastery of St. Saviour and Saints Mary and Bridget, Syon, Middlesex; the advowsons of the vicarages of Otterton and Harpford alias Harford and Fen Ottery; and the churches and rectories of Otterton and Harpeford, and all lands etc. in Otterton, Normeston, Houghton, Pasford, Patteston, alias Pytteston, Harpeford alias Harford, Fen Otery, Otterton, Bykton and Budleigh alias East Budleigh belonging to the late monastery; also, the Water of Oter with the fishery of the same, the free warren, view of frankpledge and wreck of the sea in Otterton and Budleigh and all messuages, lands, etc. in Otterton, East Budleigh, Budleigh, Pasford, Houghton, Patteston alias Pytteston, Normeston, Pynne, Stouton, Bykton, Harpeford alias Harford, Fen Otery, Saltern, Tudwill, Polehaye Knoll and Daldyche etc., as Agnes Jorden late Abbess of the said monastery formerly held. Rent: £9. 12s.

Great Seal, in green wax, broken.

In 1542 he acquired the manor of Templecombe in Somerset and in 1544 Brownsea Island in Dorset. In 1546 with his brother John Duke he acquired Collaton Abbot, Devon and received by royal grant for himself Upper Budleigh and with his brother other manors in Devon and Somerset.

In 1550 Duke purchased from Sir Andrew Dudley, KG (c. 1507 – 1559), the "lordships and Manors of Bishops Teignton, Radway and West "Teyngmouth" and the rectories and church of Bishops Teignton and Radway". A chief rent of £20 was payable to Dudley after the death of "John, Bishop of Exeter", presumably Bishop John Vesey (died 1554). The purchase included the manor of "Lyndrygge" (Lindridge House).

== Purchase of chantries ==
Duke purchased in 1548, with Thomas Bell (1486–1566), cap manufacturer and thrice Mayor of Gloucester, the former chantry of St. Catherine established at that saint's altar in St. Mary de Crypt Church, Gloucester. It had been established by the will of Garet van Eck in 1506 and comprised originally 100 marks, a house, vestments and plate. Its income in 1548 was £7 6s 4d, swelled by endowments subsequently received, including a stable and garden in the city and property in Lydney and Ripple, Worcestershire. Duke and Bell also purchased in 1548 a former obit for Richard Manchester, which owned a tenement producing income of 22s.

== Marriage and progeny ==
Richard Duke married twice:

- Firstly, before April 1539 to Elizabeth Franke, daughter of John Franke of Yorkshire, by whom he had one daughter:
  - Christina Duke (died 1608) who married twice:
    - Firstly to George Cobham (alias Brooke) (1533 – c. 1569), MP, 2nd son of George Brooke, 9th Baron Cobham (c. 1497 – 1558), KG
    - Secondly to Gregory Sprint, MP for Shaftesbury in 1586 and Bridport in 1589, the son from her first marriage of her father's second wife Joan Hoby. He was from a modest background, the son of John Sprint, an apothecary of Bristol, and by his marriage he acquired considerable wealth. His residences became two of the manors acquired by Duke, Templecombe and Colaton Raleigh. He became involved in legal and physical disputes over the ownership of Templecombe, where he had built his residence, with his wife's sons from her first marriage, Duke Brooke and Peter Brooke.
- Secondly shortly after April 1562, as her 3rd husband, to Joan Hoby, daughter of Thomas Hoby (or Halby) of London and widow successively of William Pantin of London and John Sprint, apothecary of Bristol. He had by his second wife a son who died in infancy. She married fourthly Roger Gifford.

== Death and succession ==
Duke died on 8 September 1572. He died intestate but had settled his lands on trustees in 1562 of which trust the beneficiary at his death was his nephew Richard II Duke (died 1607), the son of his brother John Duke "of Pinne", (now Pinn Barton Farm about 3 miles NE of Otterton) who thus inherited Otterton and his other lands. His daughter Christina inherited most of his personal estate. Richard II Duke married Katherine Prideaux, the daughter of George Prideaux of Nutwell.

In 1584 Sir Walter Raleigh asked "Mr. Duke, of Otterton", to sell him "Hayes", the property inherited in the 15th century from the Poer or Power family. Aubrey copied his written request, long preserved by the Duke family at Otterton and seen there by Polwhele shortly before 1793. Raleigh wrote the letter from the Court, on 26 July 1584, and signed it "by Mr. Duke's very willing frinde in all I shal be able, W. Ralegh". The text is as follows:

"Mr Duke—I wrote to Mr Prideux to move yow for the purchase of Hayes a farme som tyme in my fathers possession. I will most willingly geve yow what so ever in your conscience yow shall deeme it worth: and if yow shall att any tyme have occasion to use mee, yow Shall find mee a thanckfull frind to yow and yours. I have dealt wth Mr Sprinte for suche things as he hathe at Colliton and ther abouts and he hath promised mee to dept wth the moety of otertowne unto yow in consideration of Hayes accordinge to the valew, and yow shall not find mee an ill neighbore unto yow here after. I am resolved if I cannot 'ntreat yow, to build att Colliton but for the naturall disposition I have to that place being borne in that howse I had rather seat my sealf ther then any wher els thus leving the matter att large unto Mr Sprint I take my leve resting reedy to countervail all your courteses to the vttermost of my power".

Duke refused his offer, according to Polwhele "not choosing to have so great a man for so near a neighbour".

The son and heir of Richard II Duke was Richard III Duke (1567 – 19 April 1641), whose monumental brass plaque survives in Otterton Church. He married Margaret Bassett, a daughter of Sir Arthur Bassett (1541–1586), MP, of Umberleigh, Devon, (whose chest tomb exists in Atherington Church) by his wife Eleanor Chichester. An elaborate stone monument sculpted with strapwork decoration, showing the prominent date "1589" exists against the east wall in the south transept of Otterton Church. At its top it shows the arms of Duke impaling Bassett, with the Duke crest above, mutilated. The date 1589 appears to refer to the date of their marriage.

== Sources ==
- Miller, Helen, biography of Richard Duke published in History of Parliament: House of Commons 1509–1558, ed. Bindoff, T., 1982
