= John Duke (Honiton MP) =

English politician

Heath's Name Act 1750
- Act of Parliament
- Parliament of Great Britain
- Long title: An Act to enable John Heath Esquire, and his Heirs Male, to take and use the Surname and Arms of Duke, according to the Direction of the last Will and Testament of Richard Duke Esquire, deceased.
- Citation: 24 Geo. 2. c. 3 Pr.
- Territorial extent: Great Britain

Dates
- Royal assent: 12 March 1751
- Commencement: 17 January 1751 (Note: Start of session.)

Status: Current legislation

John Duke (born Heath; c. 1717–1775), of Gittisham, near Honiton, Devon, was an English politician.

He was a Member (MP) of the Parliament of Great Britain for Honiton 1747–1754 and 1761–1768. He changed his surname from Heath to Duke by a private act of Parliament, Heath's Name Act 1750 (24 Geo. 2. c. 3 Pr.), as a condition of the will of his uncle Richard Duke (Richard VII Duke), at which point he inherited the Manor of Otterton in Devon.

He died on 3 November 1775 without any children, and the Duke estates passed to Robert Duke of Otterton, another nephew of Richard Duke.
