= Hayes Barton =

Farmhouse in East Budleigh, England

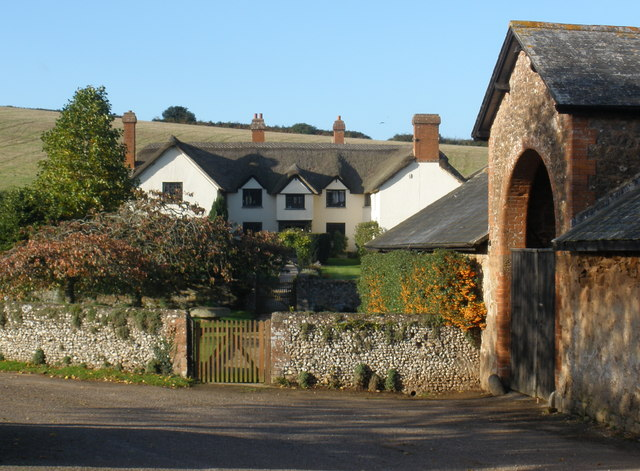
- Hayes Barton in 2008
- Interactive map of Hayes Barton
- 50°39′32″N 3°20′42″W
- Type: Farmhouse
- Location: Hayes Lane; East Budleigh, Devon, England

History
- Built: 15th century

Listed Building – Grade II*
- Official name: Hayes Barton including Garden Walls Adjoining to the South East
- Designated: 11 November 1952
- Reference no.: 1334014

Hayes Barton is a Grade II* listed farmhouse in East Budleigh, Devon. It was the birthplace and childhood home of Sir Walter Raleigh.

== History ==
The house was built circa 1484 and was constructed using cob walls, based on a stone foundation. The original house had a rectangular layout and wings and a porch were later added to the structure, making an E-shape.

The house was originally called Poerhayes after the le Poer family and then Dukeshayes after the latter family acquired the estate through marriage. Hayes Barton was the birthplace and childhood home of the statesman and explorer Sir Walter Raleigh. The Raleigh family leased the property from the Duke family and the property later passed to the Rolle family in the 18th century.

It is a Grade II* listed property.
