= Court of General Surveyors =

Court

The Court of General Surveyors was established during the reign of King Henry VIII of England, along with three other courts (those of Augmentations, First Fruit and Tenths, and Wards and Liveries) following the dissolution of the monasteries. Together, their primary functions were to gain better control over the land and finances formerly held by the Roman Catholic Church in the Kingdom of England and Wales.

The Court of General Surveyors was established in 1540 and handled monastic lands confiscated as a result of the treason of their abbots. The other monastic lands were dealt with by the Court of Augmentations, set up in 1536. These two courts were amalgamated in 1547, under the new name "Court of Augmentations and Revenues of the King's Crown" and the new court was then absorbed into the Exchequer in 1553.
