= Wiscombe Park =

Country house in Devon, England

Coordinates: 50.731408°N 3.154392°W

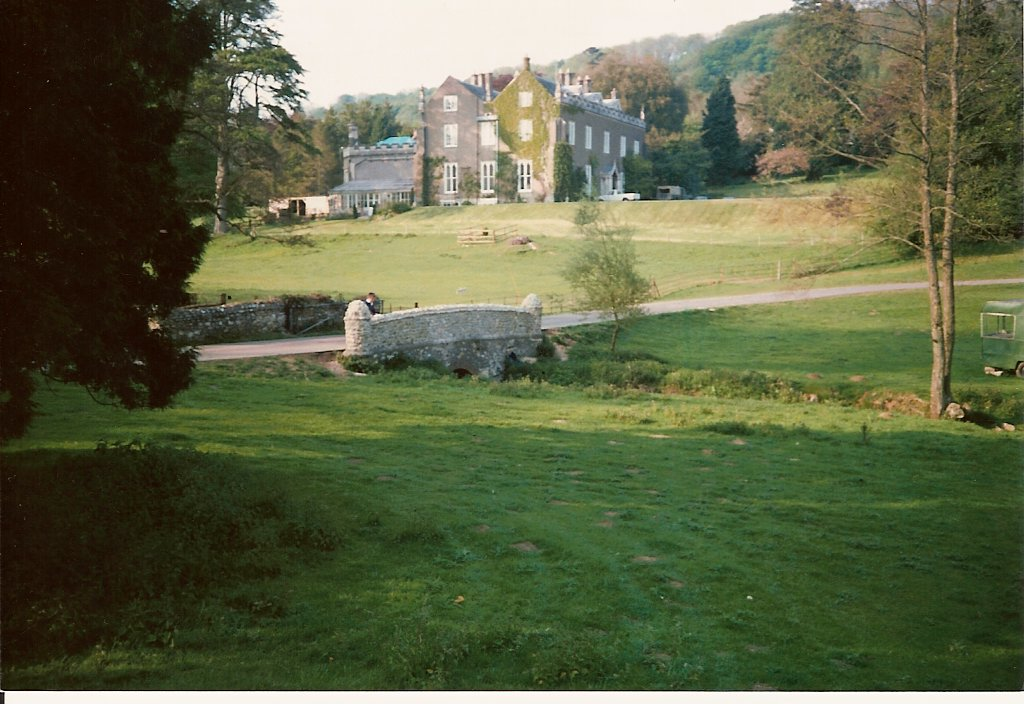
Wiscombe Park House

Wiscombe Park is a 19th-century Gothic country house in Southleigh, Devon, UK which stands in parkland some 3 miles west of Colyton. The house is a grade II* listed building. The parkland now hosts the 1000 yard (914 metre) Wiscombe Park Hillclimb course.

Wiscombe belonged in medieval times to Otterton Priory and was granted in the reign of Henry III to Sir William Bonville, in whose time the Park was stocked with deer. It then passed to the Marquis of Dorset, later the Duke of Suffolk, after whose attainder it passed first to the Petre family and then to the Hows, from whom it was bought c.1815 by Charles Gordon of the Gordon family (The Earls of Aberdeen).

The present house was built in 1826 by Joseph Power of Colyton for Gordon on the site of the old manor house. It is a two-storey double depth building of plastered stone rubble with slate roofs. A large single storey billiard room projects at right angles to rear of the left end.

The property was purchased by Richard and Bunny Chichester in 1953 who decided that the park would be ideal for a hill climb course. The first hill climb meeting was staged on 24 August 1958.
