= Southleigh =

Village in Devon, England

Coordinates: 50.735887°N 3.122812°W

- Location within Devon
- OS grid reference: SY2086193521
- Shire county: Devon
- Region: South West
- Country: England
- Sovereign state: United Kingdom
- Post town: COLYTON
- Postcode district: EX24
- Dialling code: 01297
- Police: Devon and Cornwall
- Fire: Devon and Somerset
- Ambulance: South Western
- UK Parliament: Honiton and Sidmouth

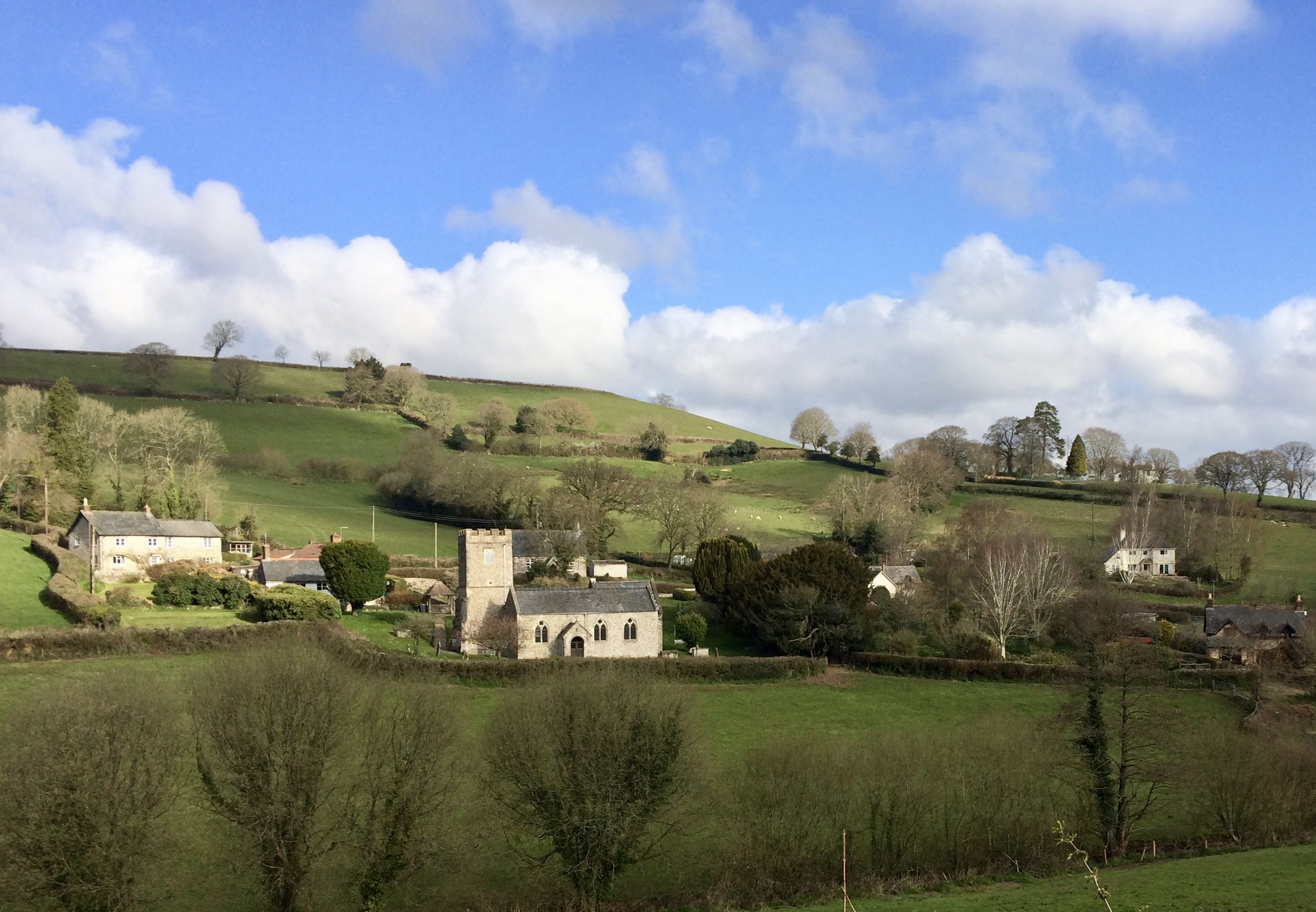
View of Southleigh

Southleigh is a village and civil parish in the East Devon district of Devon, England. Its nearest town is Colyton, which lies approximately 3 miles (4.8 km) east from the village. Southleigh parish encompasses Wiscombe Park with its hill climb course.

The parish church is dedicated to St. Lawrence.

The parish is home to an Iron Age hill fort, Blackbury Castle (also known as Blackbury Camp). It was built during the 4th century BC. It was used by an Iron Age tribal people, probably for several hundred years. Blackbury Camp had impressive ramparts, and the single entrance was protected by a large triangular earthwork or barbican. Now surrounded by woodland, the hill fort is a popular spot for picnics.
