= St Mary's Church, Axminster =

Church in Devon, England

St Mary's Church
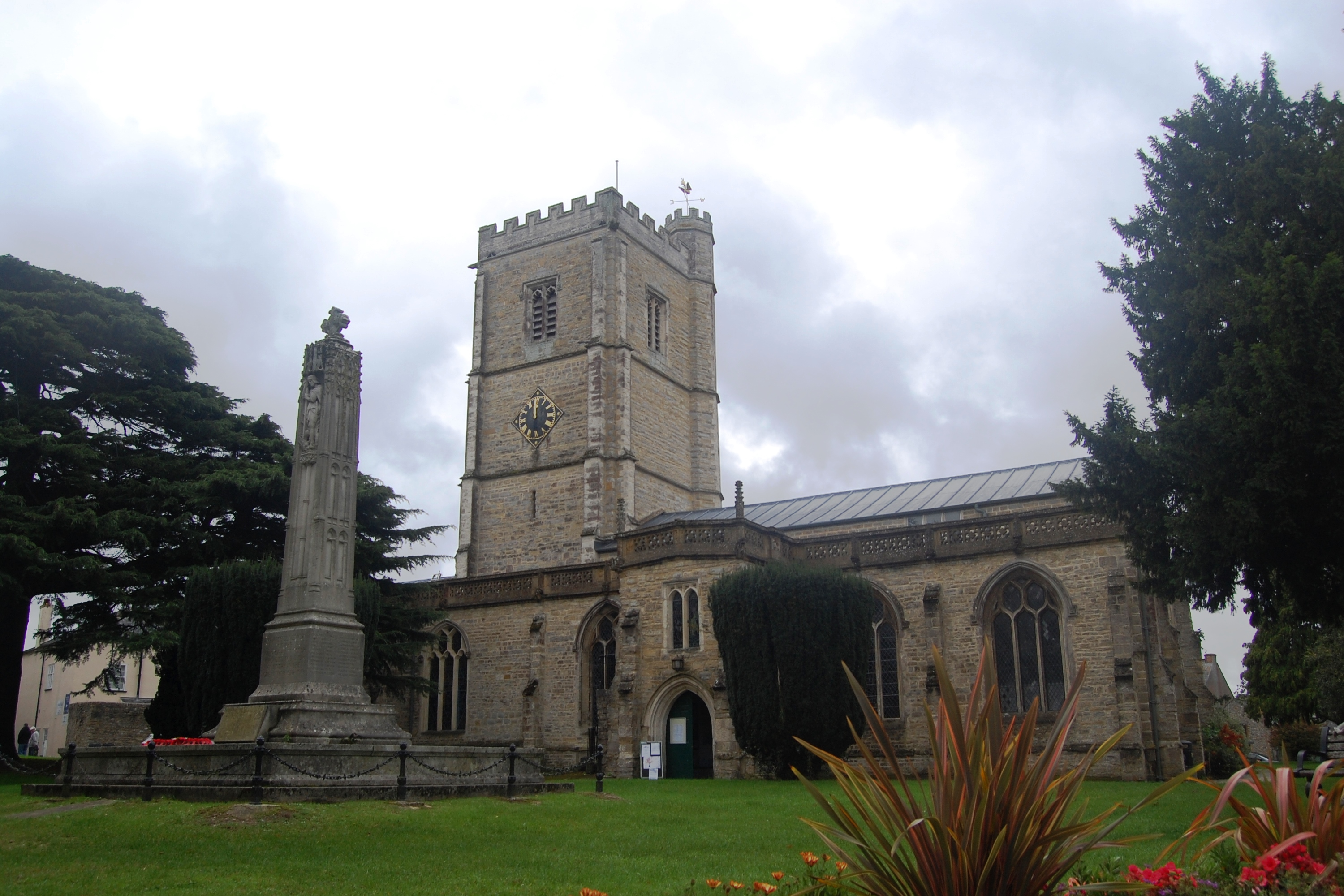
- St Mary's Church

Religion
- Affiliation: Church of England

Location
- Location: Axminster, Devon, England
- Interactive map of St Mary's Church
- Coordinates: 50.7816°N 2.9993°W

Architecture
- Type: Church

St Mary's Church is a Church of England church in Axminster, Devon, England. The church has Norman origins, although much of the building dates from the 13th–15th centuries. St Mary's is Axminster's parish church and the oldest building in the town.

St Mary's has been Grade II* Listed since 1950. The earliest surviving section of the church is a reset doorway from the Norman period, while the tower, rebuilt in the 13th century, was restored in 1896. The church suffered an arson attack in 2014, and underwent restoration and repair work before reopening in 2015.

A World War I memorial is located in the churchyard. An obelisk with Perpendicular decorations, it has been Grade II Listed since 1983. It lists the names of 65 local men who lost their lives in the war, with a later addition of 19 names from World War II. An early 19th-century tomb chest, located by the churchyard's north east gate, is also Grade II Listed.
