= Otterton Mill =

Water mill in Devon, England

Coordinates: 50.65954°N 3.30329°W

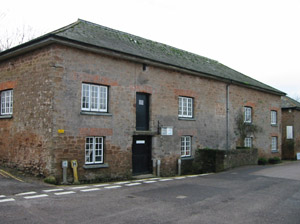
Otterton Watermill

Otterton Water Mill is at the village of Otterton, near Budleigh Salterton in Devon, England.

Otterton Water Mill is set beside the River Otter in Devon. A watermill was recorded in this locality in Domesday Book in 1086. The mill possessed three pairs of stones. The manor and its mill were given by King Henry V to the nuns of Syon Abbey. At the Dissolution the manor was sold to Richard Duke, in whose family's possession the mill remained for 200 years. Sold again in 1785 to Denys Rolle, the estate and the mill subsequently passed through marriage to the Clinton family, who still own the mill as part of the Clinton Devon Estates. Milling stopped in 1959 and the buildings were subsequently used for grain storage. The watermill was restored in 1977 by Desna Greenhow, and has been operated again since, remaining functional today. Beside the mill is a bakery, a shop, a restaurant and a gallery of art and crafts.

The mill hosts a yearly event with a "Portable Antiquities team" to examine archaeological finds made in the area.

== See also ==
- List of oldest companies
