= Farringdon, Devon =

Village and civil parish in East Devon, England

Farringdon
- Village
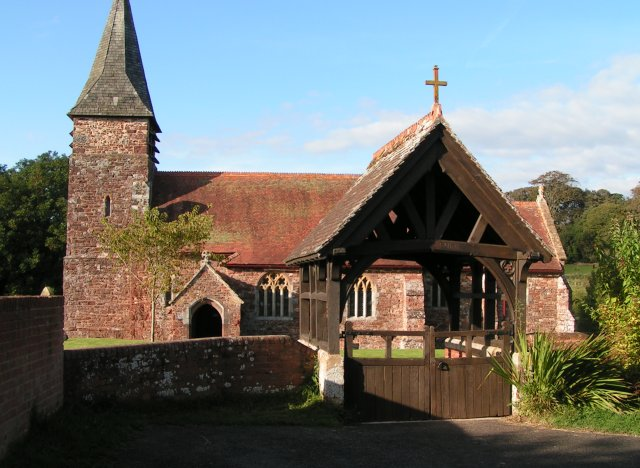
- St Petrock's church, Farringdon

- Location within Devon Location within the United Kingdom
- Coordinates: 50°42′48″N 3°23′48″W
- Country: England
- County: Devon
- District: East Devon
- Time zone: UTC+0:00 (GST)

Farringdon is a village, civil parish and former manor in the district of East Devon in the county of Devon, England. The parish is surrounded clockwise from the north by the parishes of Clyst Honiton, Aylesbeare, a small part of Colaton Raleigh, Woodbury, Clyst St Mary and a small part of Sowton.

The village is twinned with Secqueville-en-Bessin, Normandy, France.

The parish church of St Petrock and St Barnabas is a Grade II* listed building. Rebuilt in 1870, it retains its original Norman font. One of its most famous incumbents was John Travers (died 1620), a Nottingham man who was brother to the famous puritan cleric Walter Travers and who was related by marriage to another, Richard Hooker.

== Manor ==
The manor of Farringdon was long held by the "de Farringdon" family, whose pedigree from the early 13th century to the late 16th century is given in the Heraldic Visitations of Devon. Lancelot Farringdon (d.1598) "a proper and discret gentleman in outward show", in the words of Risdon (d.1640), was the last in the male line and committed suicide, and was "found hanged in his bedchamber by his garter to the bedstead". His estates passed to his two sisters, Abigail Farringdon, the elder, married to John Drake of Peter Tavy in Devon, and Mary Farringdon, the younger sister whose share of the inheritance included Farringdon, married to William Cooper. The arms of Farringdon were: Sable, three unicorns in pale argent armed and crined or.

== Historic estates ==
The parish of Farringdon contains various historic estates including:

- Crealy (anciently Crowlegh, Crowleigh, Crealy, Crailey, Crayley, etc.), in about 1600 the seat of the "Mortimer alias Tanner" family. Today it is the site of the "Crealy Adventure Park & Resort" themepark.
- Denbow (anciently Penbow, Benbow, etc.), anciently a seat of the Martyn family.
- Upham, in the time of Pole (d.1635), the seat of Humfry Walrond (born 1554), (4th son of Humphry II Walrond (died 1586) of Bradfield in the parish of Uffculme, Devon) who purchased it from a member of the Duke family of Otterton. At some previous time it had been a possession of the Cary family. The surviving 17th century mansion, now a farmhouse, has on the first floor a plaster overmantel with strapwork decoration.
