= Court of Augmentations =

Court in England 1536–1554

Thomas Cromwell established the Court of Augmentations, also called Augmentation Court or simply The Augmentation in 1536, during the reign of King Henry VIII of England. It operated alongside three lesser courts (those of General Surveyors (1540–1547), First Fruits and Tenths (1540–1554), and Wards and Liveries (1540–1660) following the dissolution of the monasteries (1536 onwards). The Court's primary function was to gain better control over the land and finances formerly held by the Roman Catholic Church in the Kingdom of England. The Court of Augmentations was incorporated into the Exchequer in 1554 as the Augmentation Office.

== History and structure ==
The Court of Augmentations was one of a number of financial courts established during Henry's reign. It was founded in 1536 to administer monastic properties and revenues confiscated by the crown at the dissolution of the monasteries. The court had its own chancellor, treasurer, lawyers, receivers and auditors.

In 1547, the Court of Augmentations was amalgamated with the Court of General Surveyors, which had been established in 1542 to administer crown lands. In 1554, the roles of the Courts of Augmentations, General Surveyors, and First Fruits and Tenths were taken over by the Exchequer.

In 1536, religious establishments with annual incomes of less than £200 per annum were dissolved. The attention of Henry and his chief minister Thomas Cromwell turned to the friaries in 1537, and thereafter to the rest of the religious houses. By 1540, they had all gone, the last to fall being Waltham Abbey in Essex. Their lands, properties and incomes went to the Crown.

Some of the monastic buildings remained in religious use – Henry allowed some monasteries to be refounded as secular cathedrals served by dean and chapter instead of priors and monks, and in rare cases the church buildings, or parts of them, were bought by locals to act as the parish church. Generally, however, the properties and lands were simply sold off to wealthy lay people, with the Court of Augmentations set up to deal with the spoils.

On the annexation of the Court of Augmentations to the Exchequer in 1554, the twelve receiverships of land revenues of the counties of England and Wales in the employment of the former were incorporated in the latter.

Until the Restoration in 1660, appointments were made by the Crown by letters patent under the great seal. Unless otherwise indicated these were for life. While in some cases this practice was followed into the eighteenth century, appointments were increasingly made by other means, for example by letters patent under the seal of the Exchequer, by the Treasury, the Chancellor of the Exchequer.

== Procedures for sale of property ==
Particulars for the sale of a property that came to the Crown at the dissolution of the monasteries were produced by the auditors (who were appraisers) of the Court of Augmentations of the King's Revenue, created in 1536. The particulars would be produced in response to a warrant from the commissioners for the sale of Crown lands. A prospective purchaser of Crown land would return with the auditor's signed particular and have it rated (or reviewed and approved, sometimes with modifications) by the commissioners. The details of the rated particular would form the basis for the warrant authorizing the purchase. Particulars were usually prepared for the actual purchaser of the land. They described the nature of the land, its value, the purchase price and any restrictions on the sale.

== List of officers ==
- Clerk 1536–1554: Richard Duke (c.1515–1572)
- Auditor 1539–1552: Matthew Colthurst (d. 1559)
- Chancellor 1536-1544: Richard Rich (c. 1496-1567)
