= Church of the Nativity of the Blessed Virgin Mary, Lympstone =

Church in Devon, England

Coordinates: 50°38′58″N 3°25′33″W

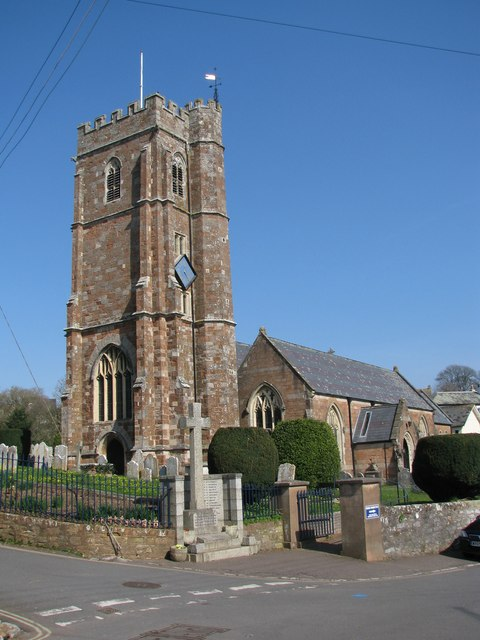

The Church of the Nativity of the Blessed Virgin Mary is the parish church of Lympstone in Devon, England. It is a Grade II* listed building.

== History ==
There has been a church on the site since at least 1329. It was largely rebuilt from 1864 to 1867.
