= Kerswell =

Kerswell is a surname. Notable people with the surname include:

- Rich Kerswell (born 20th century), British fluid mechanics scientist
- Sarah Kerswell (born 1965), British swimmer
- Henry Grant Kerswell (born 1978), British Opera Singer

== Other uses ==
- Kerswell, East Devon, a small village in Broadhembury parish, Devon, England
  - Kerswell Priory, near the village of Kerswell, Devon
- Kerswell Green, a village in Worcestershire, England
- Kings Kerswell, alternative (older) spelling of Kingskerswell, Devon
