= Newton Poppleford and Harpford =

Coordinates: 50°42′7.2″N 3°17′52.8″W

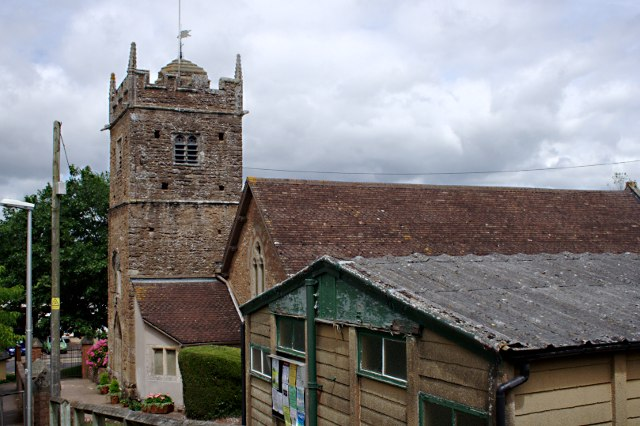
- Newton Poppleford Church

- Location within Devon
- Population: 2,153 (2019)
- Civil parish: Newton Poppleford and Harpford
- District: East Devon
- Shire county: Devon
- Region: South West
- Country: England
- Sovereign state: United Kingdom
- Post town: Sidmouth
- Postcode district: EX10
- Police: Devon and Cornwall
- Fire: Devon and Somerset
- Ambulance: South Western

Newton Poppleford and Harpford is a civil parish in East Devon, England. It is surrounded clockwise from the north by the parishes of Ottery St Mary, Sidmouth, Otterton, Colaton Raleigh and Aylesbeare. The parish includes the large village of Newton Poppleford, and also includes the smaller settlements of Harpford, Burrow, Southerton and Venn Ottery. As of 2019, it has a population of 2,153.

Harpford Common and Harpford Hill lie in the west of the parish, although Harpford village is east of Newton Poppleford. These areas were historically part of the ancient parish of Harpford.

On 1 April 1935, the Newton Poppleford and Venn Ottery parishes were merged with Harpford and 412 acres were transferred to Sidmouth. In 1968, the parish was renamed from "Harpford" to "Newton Poppleford and Harpford".
