= Salem Chapel, East Budleigh =

Church in Devon, England

Salem Chapel
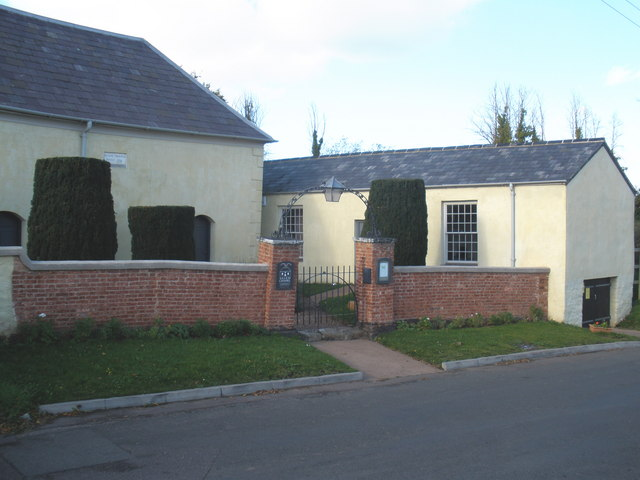
- The chapel on the left and the assembly room on the right

- Location in Devon
- 50.6577°N 3.3167°W
- Location: Vicarage Road, East Budleigh, Devon, England
- OS grid reference: SY 070 851

History
- Built: 1719
- Built for: Presbyterian

Site notes
- Governing body: Historic Chapels Trust

Listed Building – Grade II*
- Designated: 30 June 1961
- Reference no.: 1097511

Salem Chapel is in Vicarage Road, East Budleigh, Devon, England. Initially a Presbyterian, then a Congregational chapel, it was later owned by the Assemblies of God, and is now owned by the Historic Chapels Trust. The chapel, together with the adjacent assembly room and the boundary walls, is recorded in the National Heritage List for England as a designated Grade II* listed building. It is mentioned as the final two words of the short story, "Pomp and Vanities", written by S.Baring-Gould, circa 1865 and contained in his "Book of Ghost Stories", first published in 1903. The final two words, Salem Chapel, are referenced as an example of everything "heaven is not"!

== History ==
The chapel was built in 1719 and enlarged by the addition of further galleries in 1836. In the 1980s it was bought by a private owner who failed to gain support for his plans. The building then fell into disrepair. The Historic Chapels Trust visited it in 1996 and acquired its ownership in 1998. It cost £858,000 to restore the building, this being raised by grants from the Heritage Lottery Fund, English Heritage, East Devon District Council, and a variety of other sources.

It is reputed that during the 18th and 19th centuries the chapel was involved with smuggling, involving its minister Samuel Leat, the smuggled goods being concealed in the chapel's large roof space.

== Architecture ==
The chapel is built in stone which has been rendered, and has a slate roof. It is a square building with a vestry projecting at right angles from the rear of the right side. The roof is hipped on all sides. There are two doors in the entrance face which bears a limestone plaque inscribed "Salem chapel, built 1719" and a sill inscribed "enlarged 1836". There are two windows on each side and another two windows on the back wall. Internally, over the entrance is a gallery which was part of the original building, and on each side are galleries added in 1836. In the centre of the original gallery is an 18th-century clock. The preaching desk dates probably from the late 19th century as do the benches, and there are some 18th-century box pews in the galleries. The ceiling is vaulted and is supported by a central steel post. The former central post had been iron but this was replaced during the restoration.

The separate assembly room has a rectangular plan and under it is a basement. On its long face is a door between two sash windows. There is another sash window on the left end, and on the right end is a door leading to the basement. The boundary wall is constructed in rubble and brick. On the front wall are two gate piers between which are cast iron double gates and a wrought iron overthrow. The overthrow is decorated with scrolls and at its top is a lamp holder.

== Present day ==
Having been closed for the last few years, the chapel opened in August 2023 as the East Budleigh Heritage Centre, under licence from the Historic Chapels Trust, and will host a series of exhibitions on local history, wildlife and landscapes as well as food and other produce during the latter part of 2023.

== See also ==
- List of chapels preserved by the Historic Chapels Trust
