= Otterton Priory =

Former priory in Devon, England

Coordinates: 50.658859°N 3.302904°W

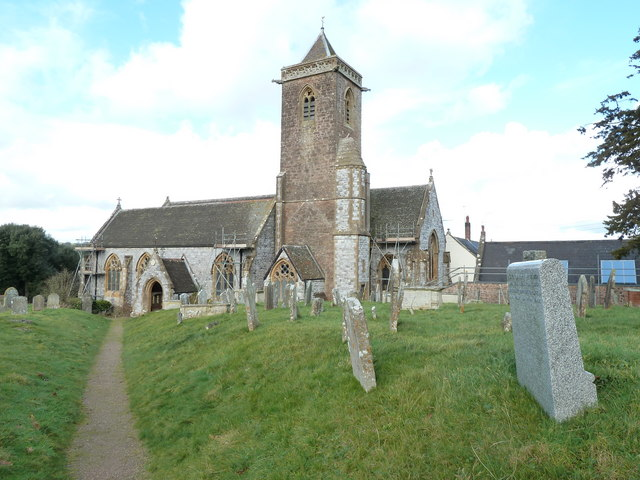
St Michael's church, Otterton. The late 11th tower was part of the priory

Otterton Priory was a priory in Otterton, Devon founded before 1087 and suppressed in 1414. The tower of the parish church is the major remaining structure of the monastery. The manor house probably reuses parts of the monastery's fabric.

== History ==
It was founded some time before 1087 as an alien priory of Benedictine monks. It was a cell of the monastery of Mont St. Michael in Normandy and in 1332 King John is recorded as creating establishing the priory for four monks. However, it is possible that he simply increased the revenues and improved the buildings of an existing monastery.

In 1332 it was briefly sold off for £120 but later a monk from the parent house probably re-established it. It was finally suppressed in 1414 and the lands associated with it were given to Syon Abbey in Middlesex.

== Buildings ==
The priory probably stood to the east of the present church on the site, St Michael and the tower would have been between the parochial nave and the east end used by the priory. Other than the tower, no remains of any monastic building are visible. Richard Duke obtained the priory lands at the Dissolution of the Monasteries and some time after 1539 constructed the manor house from part of the monastic buildings by. The manor house is now converted into a number of almshouses.
