= Colaton Raleigh =

Village in Devon, England

Coordinates: 50.677959°N 3.301555°W

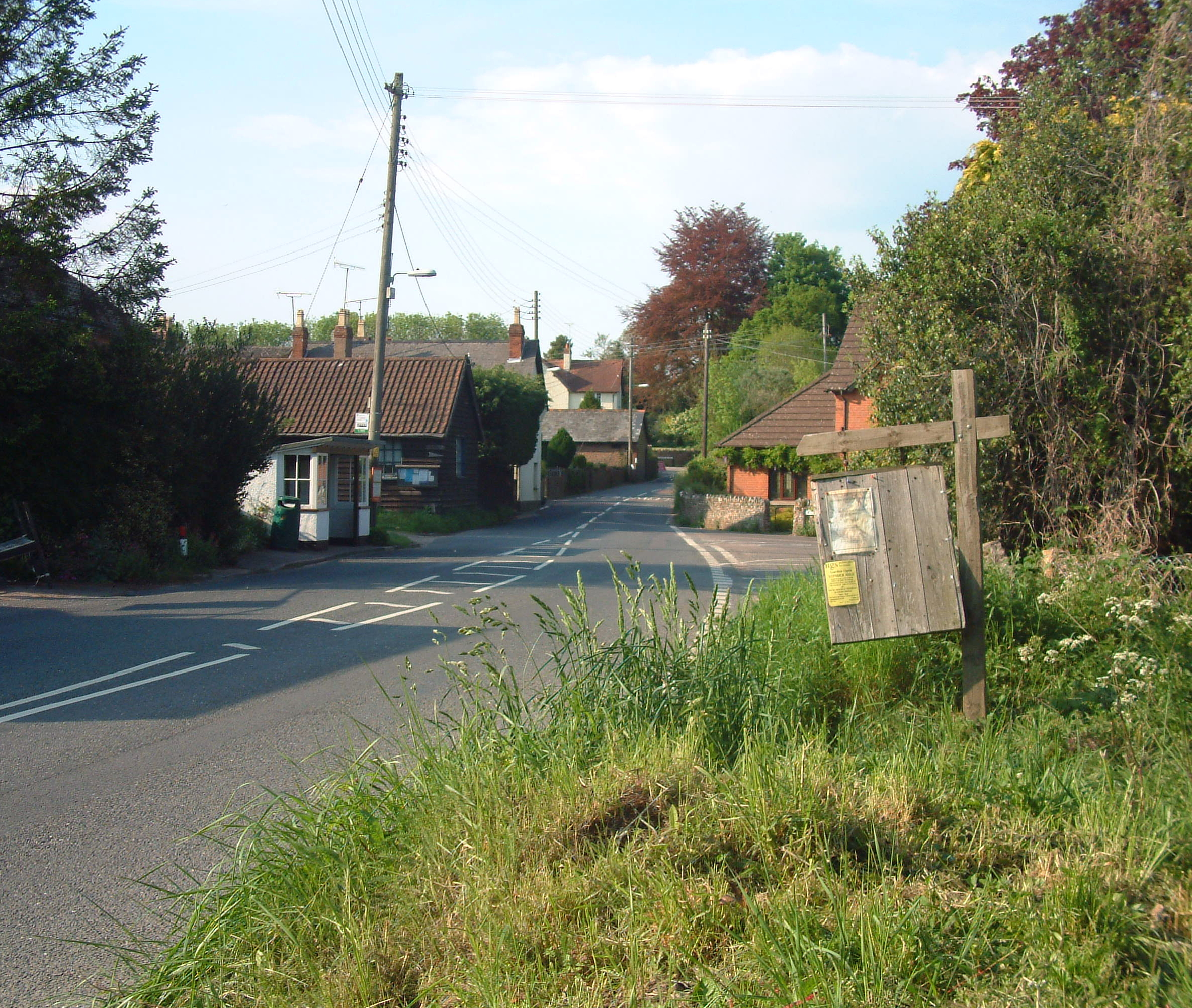
- B3178, Colaton Raleigh.

- Location within Devon
- OS grid reference: SY080873
- Shire county: Devon
- Region: South West
- Country: England
- Sovereign state: United Kingdom
- Post town: Sidmouth
- Postcode district: EX10
- Dialling code: 01395
- Police: Devon and Cornwall
- Fire: Devon and Somerset
- Ambulance: South Western
- UK Parliament: Exmouth and Exeter East

Colaton Raleigh is a village and civil parish in East Devon, England. The parish is surrounded clockwise from the north by the parishes of Aylesbeare, Newton Poppleford and Harpford, Otterton, Bicton, Woodbury and a small part of Farringdon.

The village is located to the west of the River Otter on the B3178 road between Newton Poppleford to the north and East Budleigh to the south. The village is mentioned in the Domesday Book stating it had 20 villagers, 8 smallholders and 6 slaves. In 1066 it was owned by Earl Harold (King Harold II) before passing to King William after Harold's defeat at the Battle of Hastings. The church is dedicated to St John the Baptist. The village has a shop named "Woods Village Stores" in the centre next to the B3178 road. Bus route 157 operated by Stagecoach South West runs hourly towards Exmouth and Sidmouth through the village. The village's public house is called the Otter Inn; its large garden contains monkey puzzle trees.
