= Harpford =

Village in Devon, England

Coordinates: 50.705°N 3.289°W

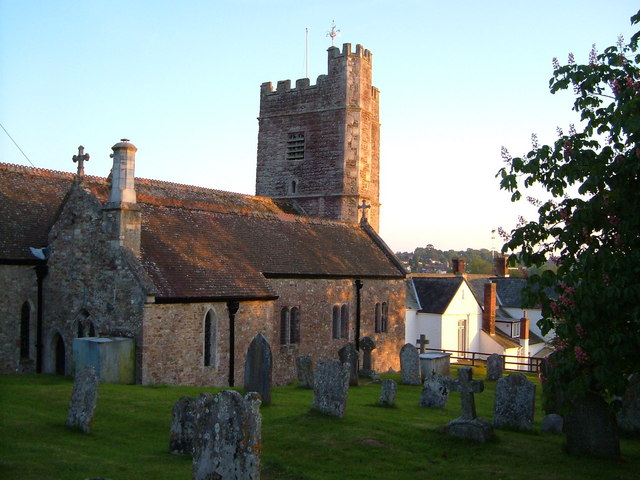
- St Gregory's church, Harpford

- Location within Devon
- OS grid reference: SY091902
- Civil parish: Newton Poppleford and Harpford
- District: East Devon
- Shire county: Devon
- Region: South West
- Country: England
- Sovereign state: United Kingdom
- Post town: Sidmouth
- Postcode district: EX10
- Dialling code: 01395
- Police: Devon and Cornwall
- Fire: Devon and Somerset
- Ambulance: South Western
- UK Parliament: Honiton and Sidmouth

Harpford is a small village in the civil parish of Newton Poppleford and Harpford, in the East Devon district, in the county of Devon, England. It lies on the east side of the River Otter, less than 1 mile north east of the larger village of Newton Poppleford.

Harpford was an ancient parish. The parish was a strip parish, which included Harpford Hill and Harpford Common some 1.5 miles west of the village, and another area of Harpford Common 1.5 miles east of the village. Harpford became a civil parish in 1866, and on 1 April 1935 the parish was enlarged by the addition of the more populous parish of Newton Poppleford and the smaller parish of Venn Ottery. On 1 May 1968 the merged parish was renamed from "Harpford" to "Newton Poppleford and Harpford". In 1931 the parish of Harpford (prior to the merge) had a population of 303.

St Gregory's Church was mentioned in 1205, although the earliest part of the fabric of the present church is dated to the 14th century. It is a Grade II* listed building.

The East Devon Way path passes through the village, and through Harpford Woods east of the village.
