= Newton Poppleford =

Village in Devon, England

Coordinates: 50.698719°N 3.295049°W

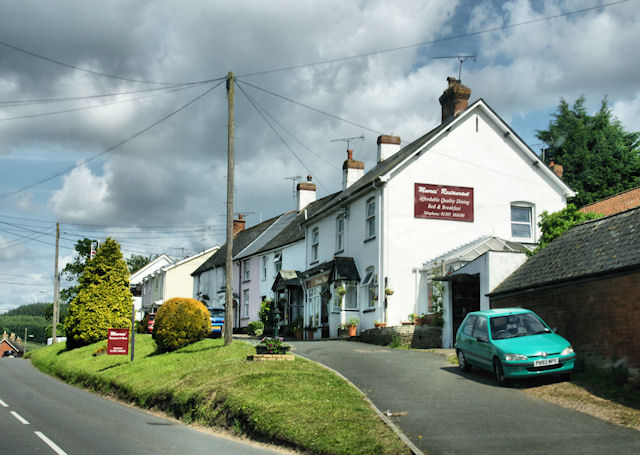
- Houses, Newton Poppleford

- Location within Devon
- Area: 0.7575 km^{2} (0.2925 sq mi)
- Population: 1,784 (2019 estimate)
  - Density: 2,355/km^{2} (6,100/sq mi)
- OS grid reference: SY085896
- Civil parish: Newton Poppleford and Harpford
- District: East Devon
- Shire county: Devon
- Region: South West
- Country: England
- Sovereign state: United Kingdom
- Post town: Sidmouth
- Postcode district: EX10
- Dialling code: 01395
- Police: Devon and Cornwall
- Fire: Devon and Somerset
- Ambulance: South Western
- UK Parliament: Honiton and Sidmouth

Newton Poppleford is a large village and former civil parish situated on the A3052 road between Exeter and Sidmouth on the west side of the River Otter, now in the parish of Newton Poppleford and Harpford in the East Devon district, in the county of Devon, England, within the East Devon AONB. Newton Poppleford is twinned with Crèvecœur-en-Auge in Normandy, France. In 2019 it had an estimated population of 1784.

The village is on the route of a Roman road from Axmouth to Exeter. It includes some whitewashed cob thatched cottages, one shop and St Luke's Church which was founded in 1331 (with the current structure dating from 1897). The town contains a village hall, primary school and sports pavilion. There was also a church hall, however it was burnt down in 2012 when fire spread from a nearby shed, possibly a result of arson. A carnival procession used to travel through the village in the autumn, although this was stopped in 2014. Newton Poppleford railway station closed in 1967 and was subsequently demolished. The church hall has since been rebuilt.

The surroundings are known for market gardening because of the excellent soil quality in the area. A variety of daffodil (the King Alfred) was originated in the village and received an award from the Royal Horticultural Society in 1899. This renowned flower, with its large colourful trumpets, was first cultivated in the house of 'The Gardens' and premises, which is found in the centre of the village. It is one of the oldest houses in the village, dating back to the 15th Century, with cob walls and thatched roof with a quaint brook (small tributary) passing through the garden joining the River Otter. There are also fruit farms nearby.

The name Newton Poppleford means 'The New Town by the Pebble Ford.' It was originally settled by the Saxons and founded as a 'new town' in the 13th century by the Lord of the Manor of Aylesbeare. He was granted the right to hold a market, which was originally sited at the centre of the town.

The East Devon Way path passes close by.

Questions and answers for the many British editions of the board game Trivial Pursuit were written at Bowhay Cottage in Newton Poppleford for 25 years by Brian Highley.

The Newton Poppleford Local History Group formed in 2014 to record and document local history and memories of local people.

== Civil parish ==
Newton Poppleford, historically a chapelry in the ancient parish of Aylesbeare, became a civil parish in 1898. In 1931 the parish had a population of 447. On 1 April 1935, it was abolished and added to the parish of Harpford, together with the smaller parish of Venn Ottery, part of Newton Poppleford went to Aylesbeare.

== Demography ==
Men in the Newton Poppleford and Harpford ward had the fourth highest life expectancy at birth, 89.4 years, of any ward in England and Wales in 2016.
