= East Budleigh =

Village in Devon, England

Coordinates: 50°39′15″N 3°19′12″W

- Village
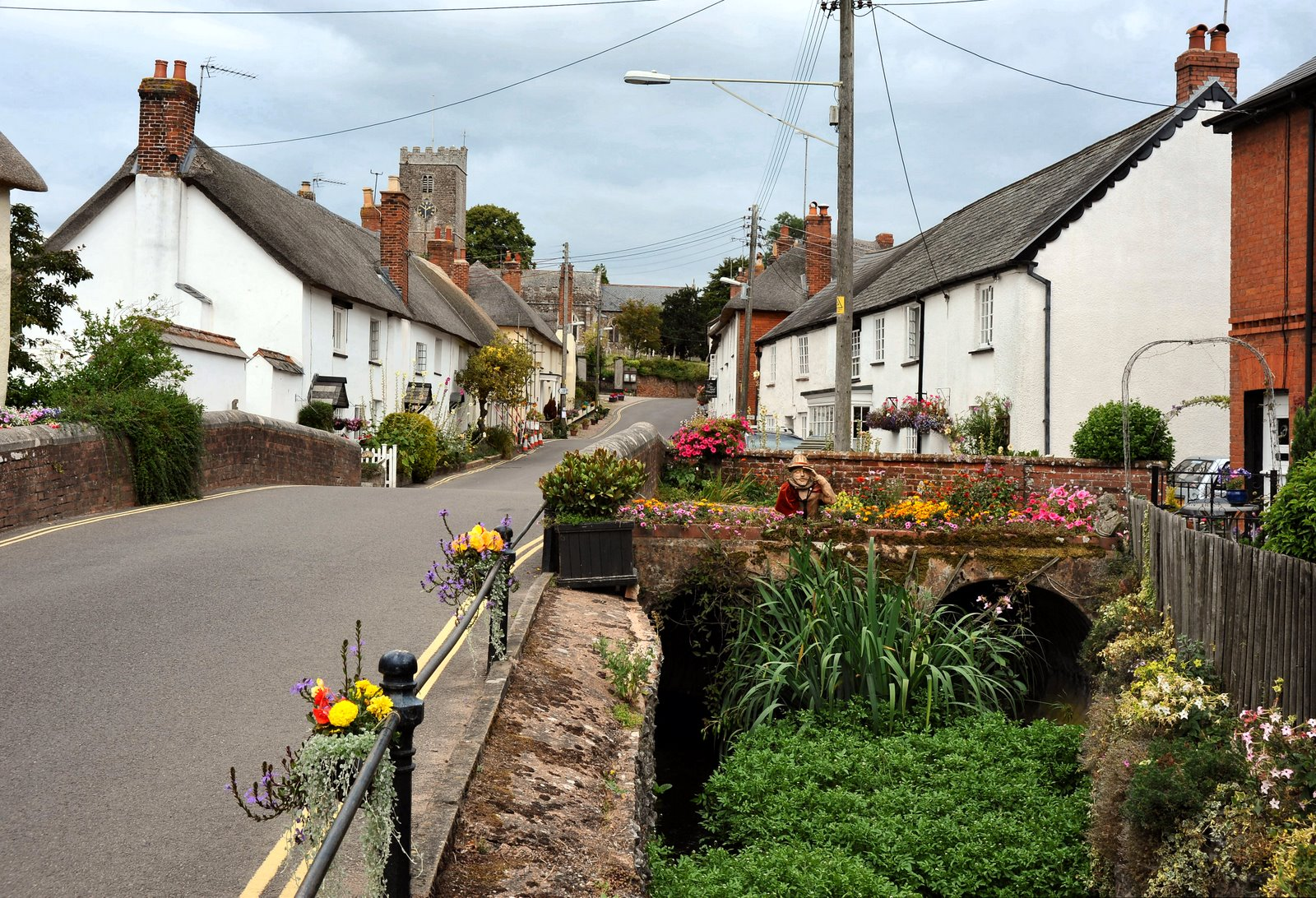
- High Street, East Budleigh

- Location within Devon
- OS grid reference: SY069842
- Shire county: Devon
- Region: South West
- Country: England
- Sovereign state: United Kingdom
- Post town: BUDLEIGH SALTERTON
- Postcode district: EX9
- Dialling code: 01395
- Police: Devon and Cornwall
- Fire: Devon and Somerset
- Ambulance: South Western
- UK Parliament: Exmouth and Exeter East

East Budleigh is a small village in East Devon, England. The villages of Yettington, Colaton Raleigh, and Otterton lie to the west, north and east of East Budleigh, with the seaside town of Budleigh Salterton about two miles south. Until the River Otter to the east silted up, the village was a market town and port; it was still being used by ships in the 15th century, according to John Leland.

Sir Walter Raleigh was born in nearby Hayes Barton in c.1552, and his parents are buried in All Saints churchyard in the village. The 14th-century church contains attractive pew ends including one bearing the Raleigh coat of arms.

In 2006 a life-size bronze statue of Raleigh by sculptor Vivien Mallock was unveiled by the Duke of Kent and is positioned at the top of the village close to the church. The cost of £30,000 was met by British American Tobacco, and was unveiled in the week when new anti-smoking laws came into effect in England and Wales.

Roger Conant, founder of Salem, Massachusetts, was born in East Budleigh in 1592 to Richard Conant.

East Budleigh had a railway station that was situated between the village and Otterton, which was closed in 1967.

== See also ==
- Salem Chapel, East Budleigh
