= Venn Ottery =

Village in Devon, England

Coordinates: 50.713°N 3.306°W

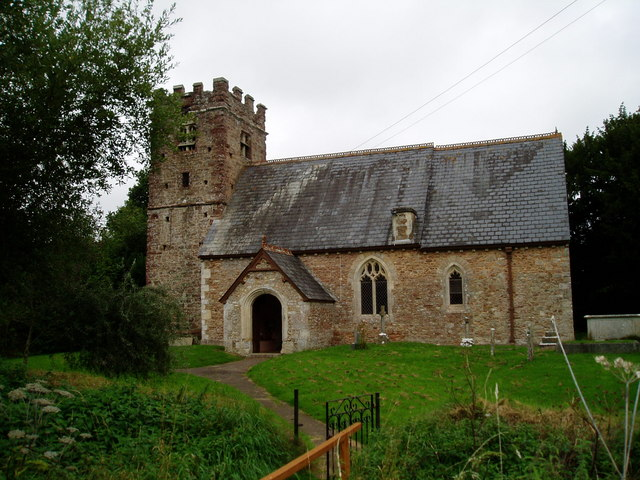

- Location within Devon
- OS grid reference: SY078912
- Civil parish: Newton Poppleford and Harpford
- District: East Devon
- Shire county: Devon
- Region: South West
- Country: England
- Sovereign state: United Kingdom
- Post town: Ottery St Mary
- Postcode district: EX11
- Dialling code: 01404
- Police: Devon and Cornwall
- Fire: Devon and Somerset
- Ambulance: South Western
- UK Parliament: Honiton and Sidmouth

Venn Ottery, historically also spelt Fen Ottery, is a small village and former civil parish, now in the parish of Newton Poppleford and Harpford, in the East Devon district, in the county of Devon, England. It lies 1 mile north of the larger village of Newton Poppleford. In 1931 the parish had a population of 66.

Venn Ottery was an ancient parish. St Gregory's Church has a 15th-century tower, and is a Grade II* listed building. Venn Ottery became a civil parish in 1866, but on 1 April 1935 the parish was abolished and added to the parish of Harpford. In 1968 the parish was renamed Newton Poppleford and Harpford.

Venn Ottery Common, west of the village, is a nature reserve owned by the Devon Wildlife Trust. It is part of the East Devon Pebblebed Heaths, a nationally important lowland heath area and site of special scientific interest.
