= Otterton =

Village in Devon, England

Coordinates: 50.658178°N 3.301008°W

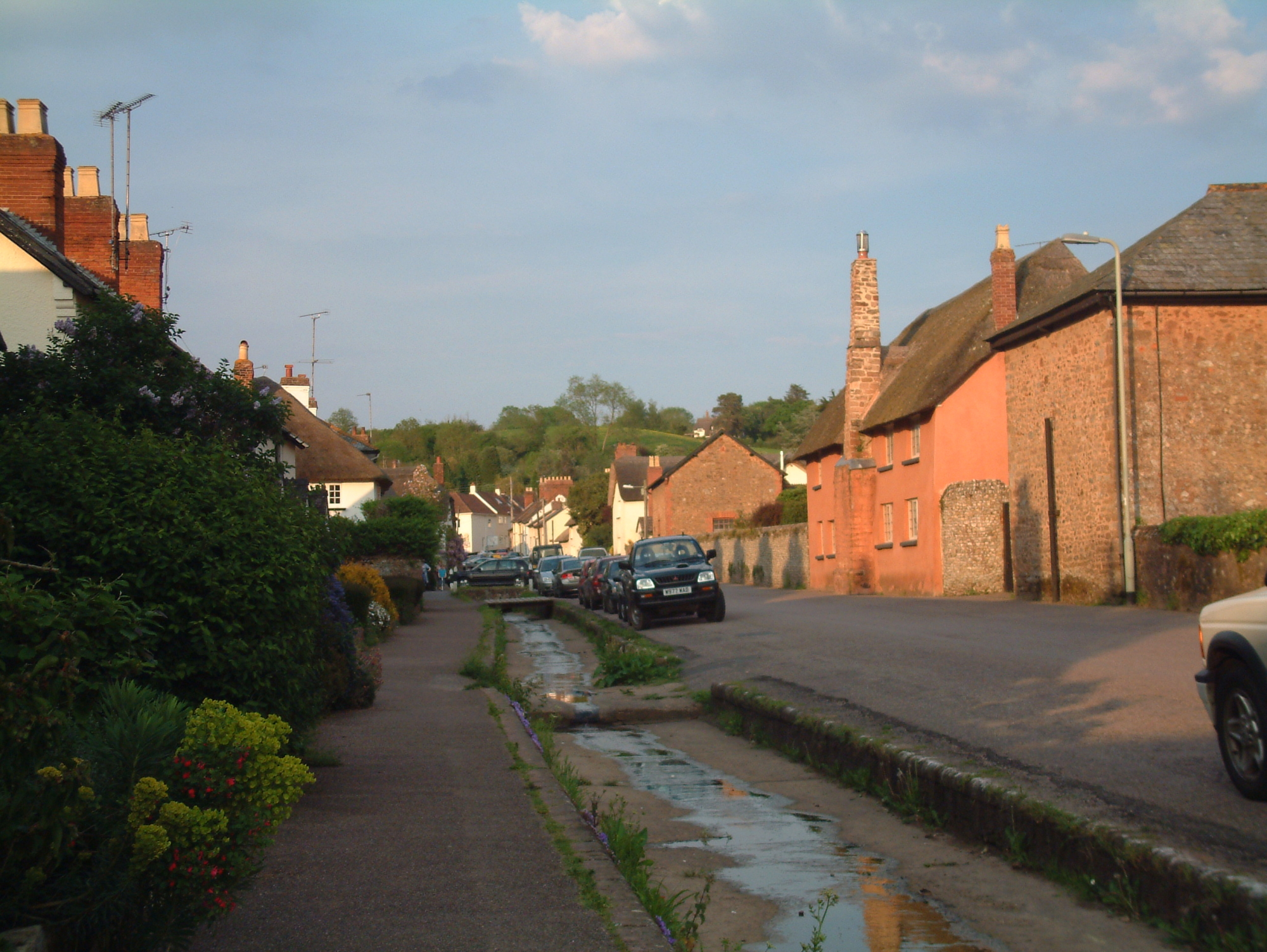
- Fore Street, Otterton

- Location within Devon
- Population: 656 (2011 census)
- OS grid reference: SY080851
- Civil parish: Otterton
- District: East Devon
- Shire county: Devon
- Region: South West
- Country: England
- Sovereign state: United Kingdom
- Post town: BUDLEIGH SALTERTON
- Postcode district: EX9
- Dialling code: 01395
- Police: Devon and Cornwall
- Fire: Devon and Somerset
- Ambulance: South Western
- UK Parliament: Exmouth and Exeter East

Otterton is a village and civil parish in East Devon, England. The parish lies on the English Channel and is surrounded clockwise from the south by the parishes of East Budleigh, Bicton, Colaton Raleigh, Newton Poppleford and Harpford and Sidmouth. In 2001 its population was 700, compared to 622 a hundred years earlier. At the 2011 census the population had reduced to 656. Otterton is part of Raleigh electoral ward whose total population at the above census was 2,120.

== Village ==
The village is located on the east bank of the River Otter, east of the B3178 road and the village of East Budleigh. It is about a mile inland of Ladram Bay, on the Jurassic Coast. It was first settled by the Saxons, and by 1000 AD had become the centre of one of the major rural communities in Devon because of its favourable location and rich resources. Burials in the churchyard ceased in 1986. The village, which includes cob and thatched cottages, is described at some length by Pevsner as "an instructive example of local building from the 16th century onwards". It is the location of Otterton Mill, a watermill and craft centre.

The Budleigh Salterton Railway, which was open from 1897 to 1967, ran along the valley of the River Otter. The station known as East Budleigh was closer to Otterton, being just over the river from the village. The platform and station building survive as a private house.

The Kings Arms is Otterton's only pub. It opened in the 1700s and was rebuilt in 1889. Today, it also serves as a restaurant and hotel.

== Parish ==
Otterton civil parish is bounded by the coast on the east and the River Otter on the west; these two bounds meet at the mouth of the river, just east of the town of Budleigh Salterton, after passing through the 57-acre (230,000 m^{2}) Otter Estuary Nature Reserve - a Site of Special Scientific Interest. The northern parish boundary leaves the river near Colaton Raleigh and swings south to meet the coast at Peak Hill, west of Sidmouth.

About ¾ of a mile west along the coast from Peak Hill is High Peak, a 157-metre high cliff. Excavations into the earthworks on top of this have shown habitation in the Iron Age, Roman period and in the 6th–8th centuries AD. Many of these earthworks have been lost to the sea by erosion. The cliffs below High Peak have yielded rare fossils from the Middle Triassic age, for example Mastodonsaurus.

== Manor ==
The church, dedicated to St Michael, belonged to the monastery of Mont Saint-Michel at the time of the Domesday Book in 1086. After passing through ownership by Syon Abbey in the 15th century, the manor with the advowson was bought by Richard Duke (c. 1515–1572) at the Dissolution of the Monasteries. Duke converted some of the monastic buildings into a mansion, part of which still exists to the north of the present-day church, which was rebuilt in 1869–71 at the sole expense of Lady Rolle to the design of Benjamin Ferrey. In 1786 the manor of Otterton, with several other manors, was sold by the heirs of the Duke family for the huge sum of £72,000 to Denys Rolle (1725–1797) of nearby Bicton, and of Stevenstone, the largest landowner in Devon.

== Twin towns – sister cities ==
Otterton is twinned with:

- Vieux, France. Since 1976
