= Littleham, Exmouth =

Village in Devon, England

Coordinates: 50°37′20″N 3°22′24″W

Littleham
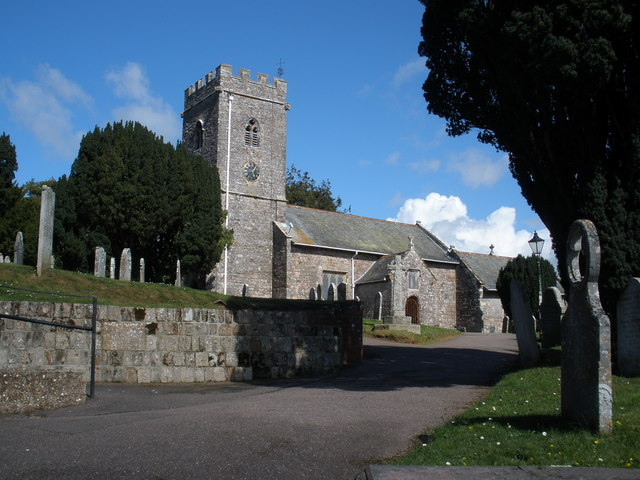

- Location within Devon
- Civil parish: Exmouth
- District: East Devon
- Shire county: Devon
- Region: South West
- Country: England
- Sovereign state: United Kingdom
- Post town: EXMOUTH
- Postcode district: EX8
- Dialling code: 01237

Littleham is an area of Exmouth in the East Devon district, Devon, England. It was historically a village and civil parish, much older than Exmouth itself; the parish was abolished on 1 April 1974. In 1961, the parish had a population of 7,954.

== History ==
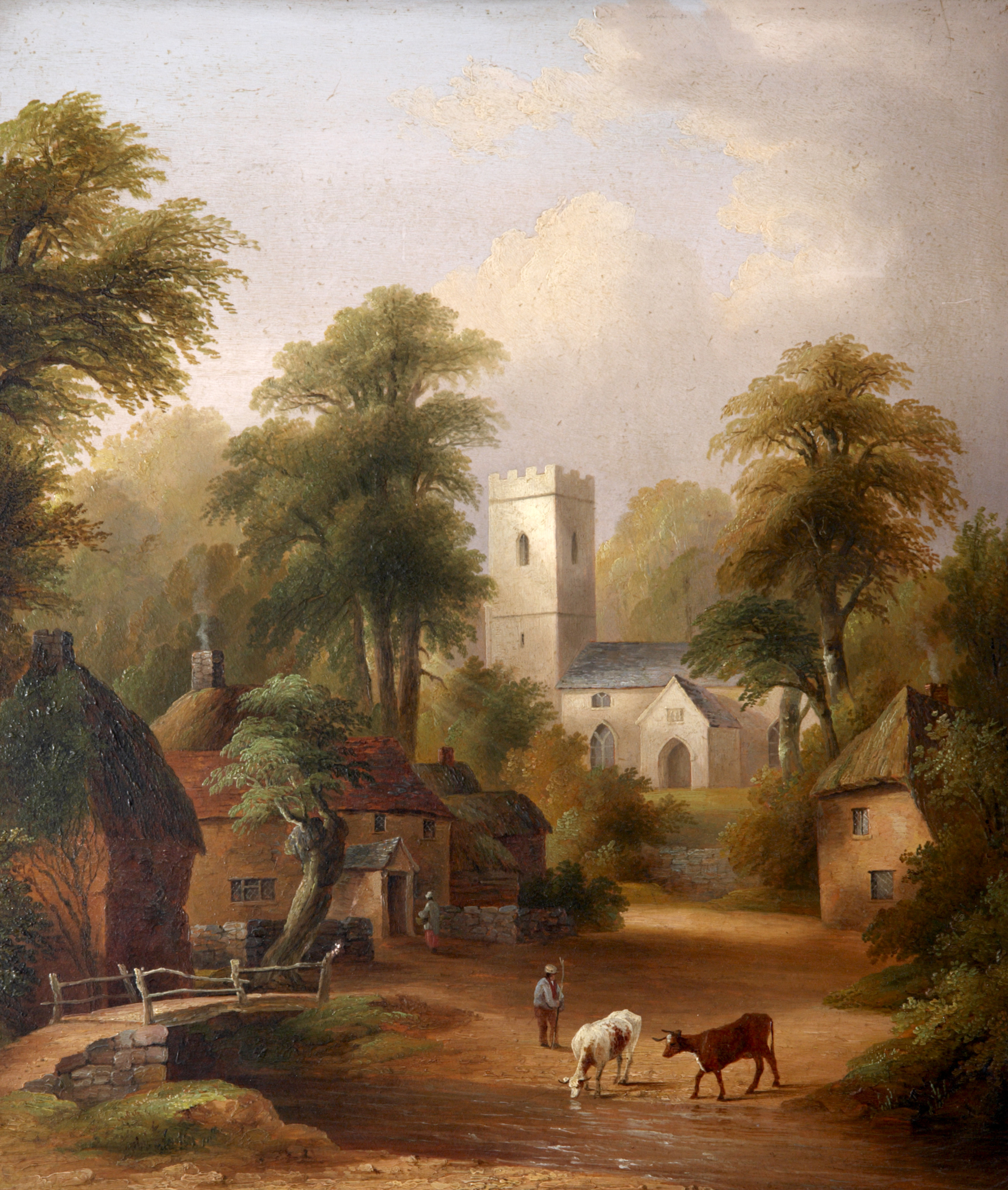
1867 painting of Littleham by John Wallace Tucker, depicting the parish church of St Margaret and St Andrew and Littleham Brook.

The ecclesiastical parish is now known as Littleham-cum-Exmouth. The original parish church dates back to the 13th century and is dedicated to St Margaret and St Andrew. Frances Nelson, wife of Lord Nelson, is buried in the churchyard. The newer Holy Trinity Church was built in 1824.

Between 1903 and 1967, Littleham railway station served the area as a stop on the Exmouth & Salterton Railway of the London and South Western Railway.

== Amenities ==
To the south of Littleham is Sandy Bay, with a large seaside caravan resort called Devon Cliffs, owned by Haven Holidays. It is also home to Littleham Cove.
