= Feniton railway station =

Railway station in Devon, England

Feniton
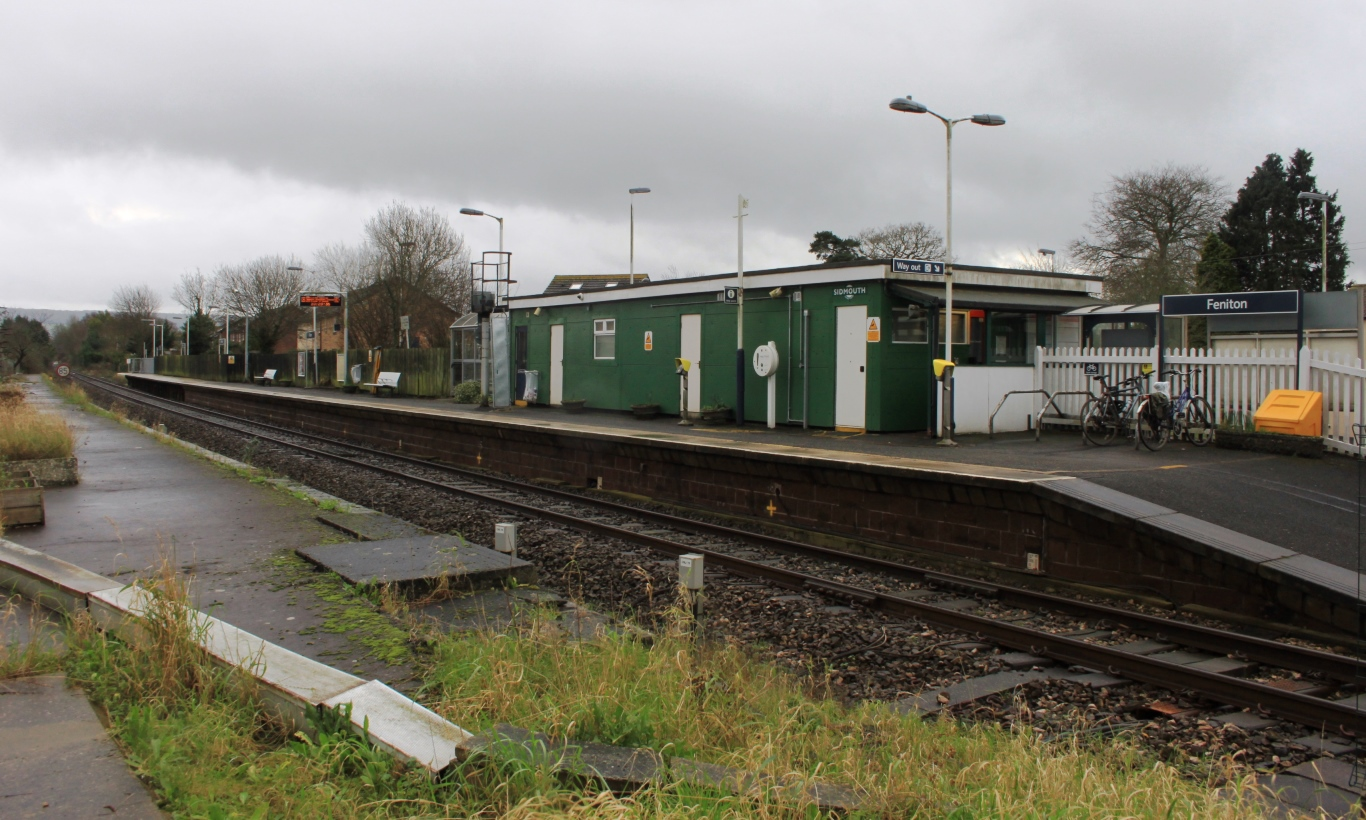

General information
- Location: Feniton, East Devon; England
- Coordinates: 50.786°N 3.285°W
- Grid reference: SY094993
- Manager: South Western Railway
- Platforms: 2 built; Operates with just 1 Eastbound disused)

Other information
- Station code: FNT
- Classification: DfT category E

History
- Original company: London and South Western Railway
- Pre-grouping: London and South Western Railway
- Post-grouping: Southern Railway

Key dates
- 19 July 1860: Opened as Feniton
- 1 July 1861: Renamed Ottery Road
- February 1868: Renamed Ottery St Mary
- 6 July 1874: Renamed Sidmouth Junction
- 6 March 1967: Closed
- 5 May 1971: Reopened as Feniton

Passengers
- 2021/22: ▲47,544
- 2022/23: ▲52,048
- 2023/24: ▲53,836
- 2024/25: ▲54,896
- 2025/26: ▲58,416
Location
Notes
- Passenger statistics from the Office of Rail and Road

Feniton railway station serves the village of Feniton in Devon, England. It was opened by the London and South Western Railway (LSWR) in 1860 but is now operated by South Western Railway which provides services on the West of England Main Line. It is 159 miles 24 chains (256.4 km) down the line from London Waterloo and is sited between Whimple and Honiton.

== History ==
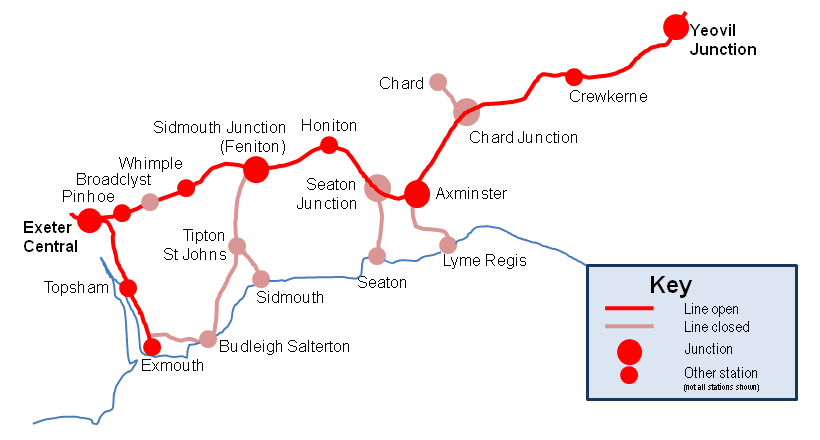
Local railway lines

The station was designed by William Tite and was opened by the LSWR on 19 July 1860, along with its Exeter Extension from Yeovil Junction to Exeter Queen Street. It was named Feniton after the nearest village, but less than a year later it was renamed (on 1 July 1861) as Ottery Road. In February 1868 this was changed again to Ottery St Mary. On 6 July 1874 a branch line to Sidmouth was opened and the station changed its name once more to become Sidmouth Junction, a name that it managed to retain for more than 90 years.

On 1 May 1897 a new line to Budleigh Salterton was opened and this was extended on 1 June 1903 to Exmouth. Although the junction for this line was at Tipton St John, Sidmouth Junction was the de facto junction as it was situated on the London main line. A third platform was provided to accommodate branch line trains; this was a terminal bay at the Yeovil end of the westbound platform. It was on this platform that the main two-storey building was situated.

A goods yard and goods shed was provided adjacent to the bay platform. This was closed on 6 September 1965. The following year saw the withdrawal of local stopping trains on the main line, but Sidmouth Junction remained open until 6 March 1967 when passenger services were withdrawn from the branch lines, after which it closed.

The station was reopened by British Rail on 5 May 1971, assuming the original Feniton name. A ticket office was erected in 1974 as the original building had been demolished while the station was closed. The platform was rebuilt and lengthened in 1992. The disused eastbound platform still stands but the goods yard site is now occupied by houses.

In 1974 the level crossing gates were replaced by lifting barriers, the level crossing box was abolished, and the barriers were operated from a panel within the station building. Then in March 2012, signalling and level crossing control was transferred to Basingstoke Area Signalling Centre.

== Facilities ==
The station has a ticket machine, a waiting room (open in the mornings only), a car park, cycle storage, a help point and a live departure board.

== Passenger volume ==
Passenger volume at Feniton
	2004–05	2005–06	2006–07	2007–08	2008–09	2009–10	2010–11	2011–12	2012–13	2013–14	2014–15	2015–16	2016–17	2017–18	2018–19	2019–20	2020–21	2021–22	2022–23	2023–24	2024–25
Entries and exits	57,541	55,341	59,872	61,653	66,644	60,048	64,490	68,468	66,958	66,394	70,534	74,294	69,078	71,972	63,808	53,724	17,456	47,544	52,048	53,836	54,896

The statistics cover twelve month periods that start in April.

== Services ==
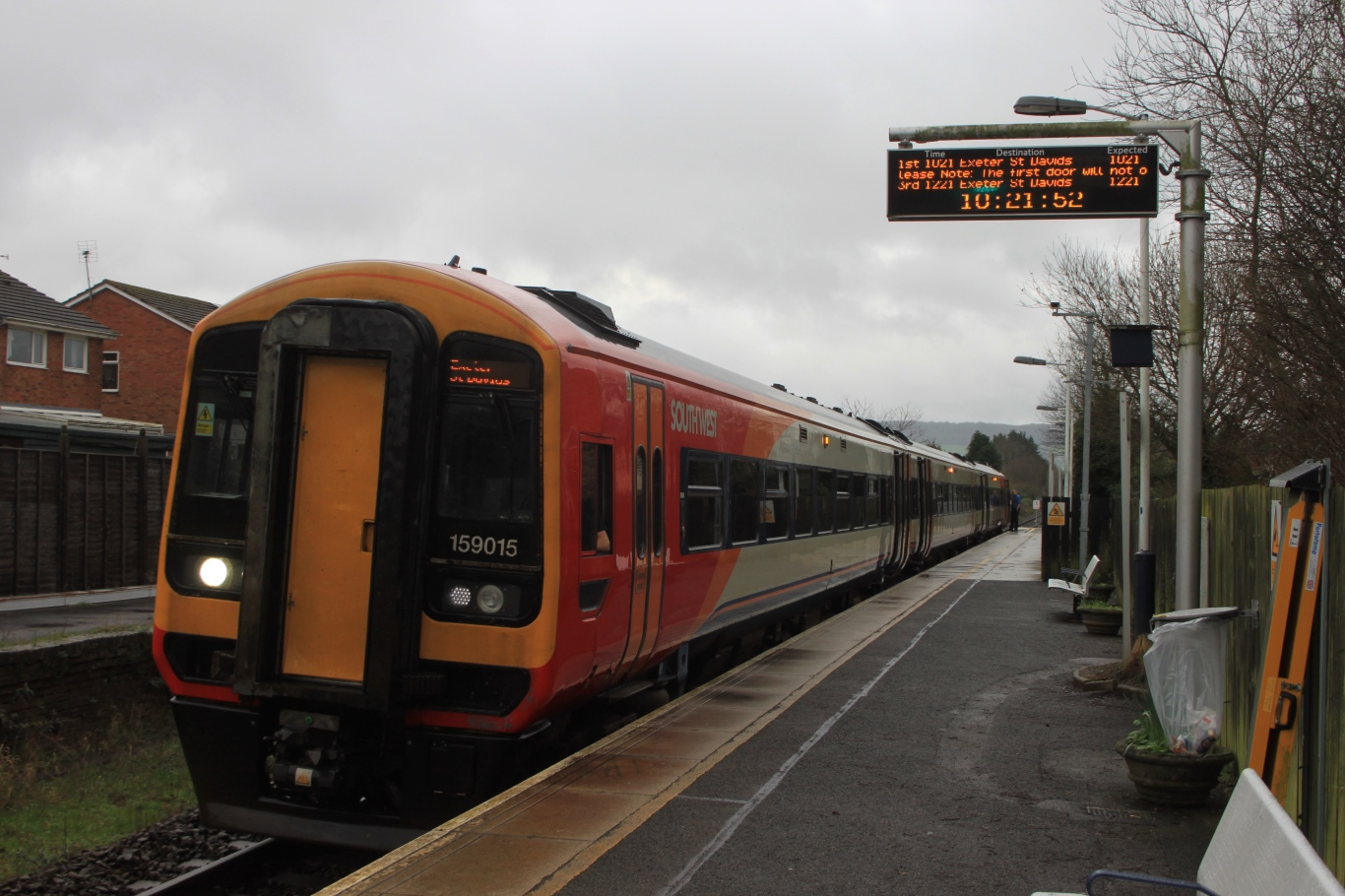
A South West Trains Class 159 with a service to Exeter St Davids

Off-peak, all services at Feniton are operated by South Western Railway.

The typical off-peak service in trains per hour is one train every two hours between Exeter St Davids and London Waterloo via Salisbury, increasing to hourly at peak times.

The station is also served by a single weekday peak hour service from Barnstaple to Axminster which is operated by Great Western Railway.

Due to the short platform at this station, passengers wishing to alight need to be in the front 3 coaches of the train as the platform can only take 3-car trains.

Preceding station	National Rail	Following station
Honiton	South Western Railway West of England Main Line	Whimple or Cranbrook
Honiton	Great Western Railway West of England Main Line Limited Service	Cranbrook
	Disused railways	
Ottery St Mary Line and station closed	British Rail; Southern Region: Sidmouth Railway; Budleigh Salterton Railway	Terminus

== See also ==
- Southern Railway routes west of Salisbury

== Bibliography ==
- Quick, Michael (2023) [2001]. Railway passenger stations in Great Britain: a chronology (PDF). version 5.05. Railway & Canal Historical Society.
