= East Budleigh railway station =

Disused railway station in Devon, England

East Budleigh
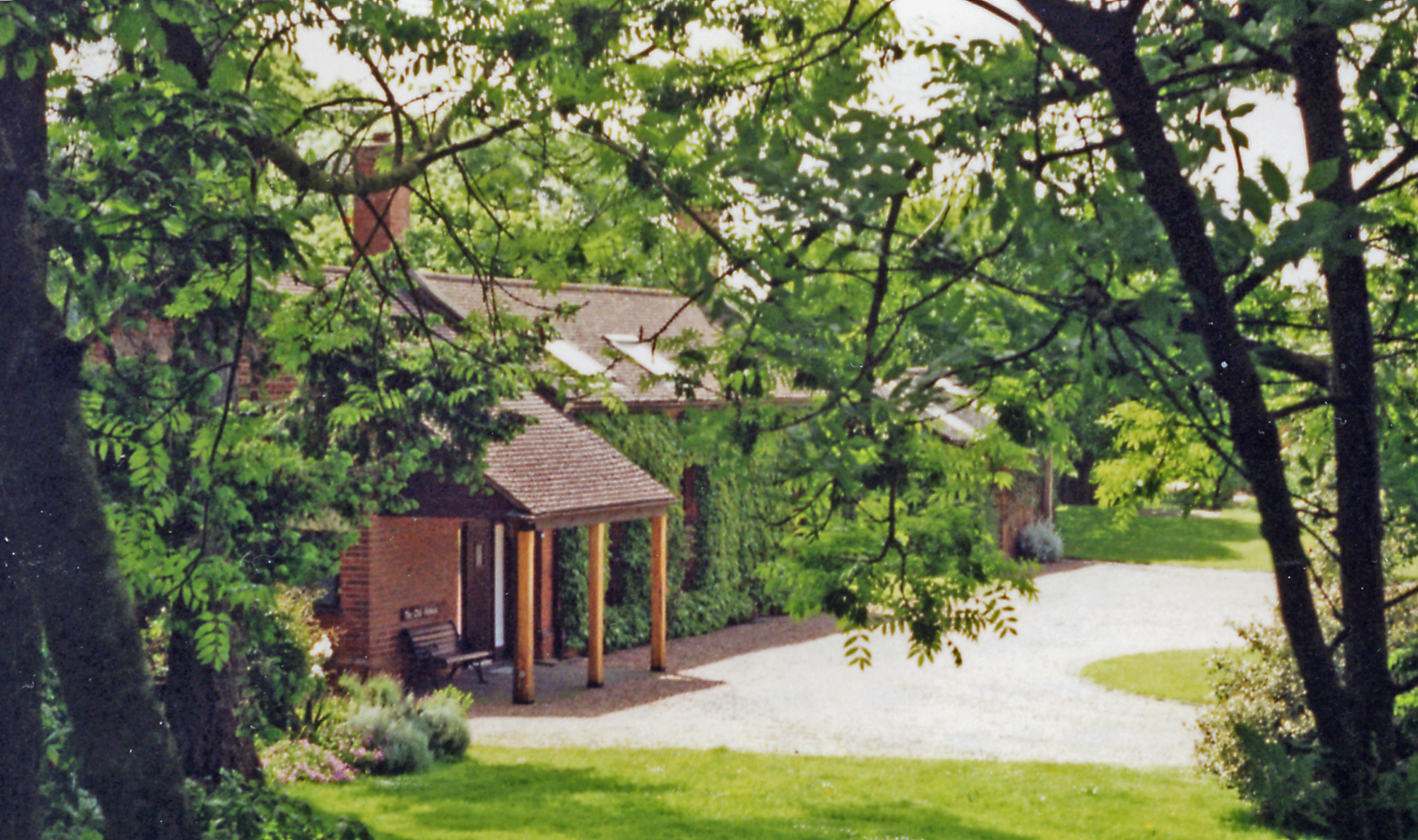
- Site of the station in 1996

General information
- Location: East Budleigh, East Devon; England
- Coordinates: 50.6589°N 3.3066°W
- Platforms: 1

Other information
- Status: Disused

History
- Original company: Budleigh Salterton Railway
- Pre-grouping: London and South Western Railway
- Post-grouping: Southern Railway

Key dates
- 15 May 1897: Opened
- 6 March 1967: Closed
Location

East Budleigh railway station is a closed railway station that served the villages of East Budleigh and Otterton in Devon, England.

== History ==
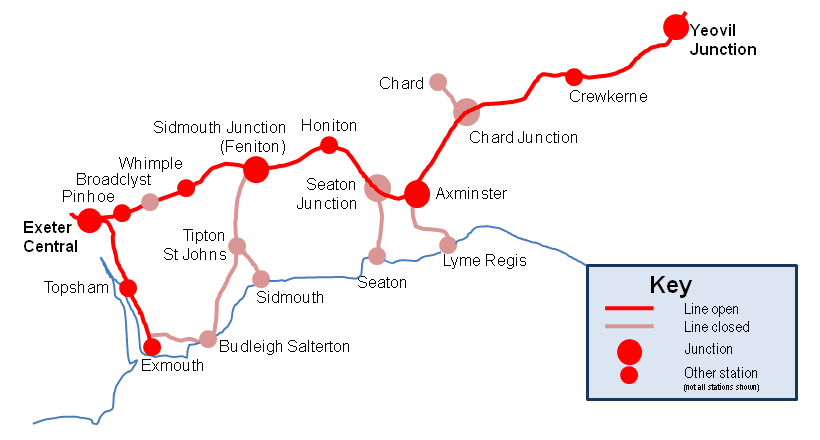
Local railway lines

It was opened as Budleigh on 15 May 1897 when the Budleigh Salterton Railway (BSR) opened the line from Tipton St Johns (on the Sidmouth Railway) to Budleigh Salterton.

The London and South Western Railway, which worked the BSR, did not name the station after the nearby village of Otterton to avoid confusion with its Otterham station on the North Cornwall line.

The station originally had a single platform with a passing loop to the south providing access to a goods siding with a cattle dock.

The station was renamed East Budleigh on 27 April 1898.

The station was host to a Southern Railway camping coach from 1936 to 1939. Two camping coaches were also positioned here by the Southern Region from 1954 to 1964.

The station was closed when the line closed on 6 March 1967.

== Present state ==
The station building and platform survive as private accommodation, with a few alterations.

Preceding station	Disused railways	Following station
Newton Poppleford; Line and station closed	British Rail; Southern Region; Budleigh Salterton Railway	Budleigh Salterton; Line and station closed

== Bibliography ==
- Grant, Donald J. (2017). Directory of the Railway Companies of Great Britain (1st ed.). Kibworth Beauchamp, Leicestershire: Troubador Publishing Ltd. ISBN 978-1-78803-768-6.
- Hurst, Geoffrey (1992). Register of Closed Railways: 1948-1991. Worksop, Nottinghamshire: Milepost Publications. ISBN 0-9477-9618-5.
- McRae, Andrew (1997). British Railway Camping Coach Holidays: The 1930s & British Railways (London Midland Region). Vol. Scenes from the Past: 30 (Part One). Foxline. ISBN 1-870119-48-7.
- McRae, Andrew (1998). British Railways Camping Coach Holidays: A Tour of Britain in the 1950s and 1960s. Vol. Scenes from the Past: 30 (Part Two). Foxline. ISBN 1-870119-53-3.
- Quick, Michael (2022) [2001]. Railway passenger stations in Great Britain: a chronology (PDF). version 5.04. Railway & Canal Historical Society. Archived from the original (PDF) on 25 November 2022.
- The Railway Clearing House (1970) [1904]. The Railway Clearing House Handbook of Railway Stations 1904 (1970 D&C Reprint ed.). Newton Abbot: David & Charles Reprints. ISBN 0-7153-5120-6.
