= Budleigh Salterton =

Town in Devon, England

Coordinates: 50°37′42″N 3°19′14″W

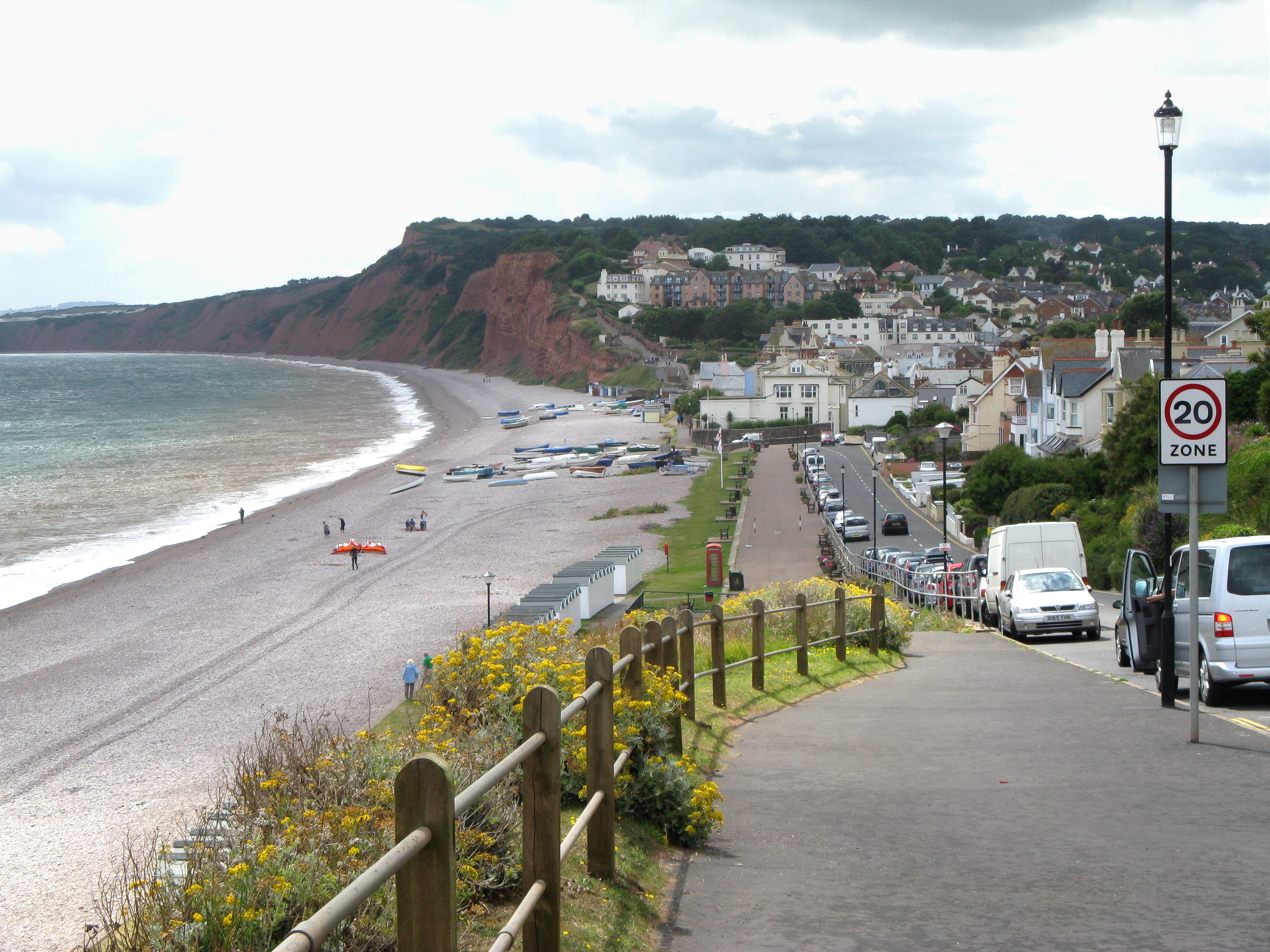
- The seafront looking west towards Exmouth. The red cliffs are around 250 million years old and form part of the Jurassic Coast World Heritage Site.

- Coat of arms

- Location within Devon
- Population: 5,240 (2021 census)
- OS grid reference: SY066818
- District: East Devon
- Shire county: Devon
- Region: South West
- Country: England
- Sovereign state: United Kingdom
- Post town: BUDLEIGH SALTERTON
- Postcode district: EX9
- Dialling code: 01395
- Police: Devon and Cornwall
- Fire: Devon and Somerset
- Ambulance: South Western
- UK Parliament: Exmouth and Exeter East

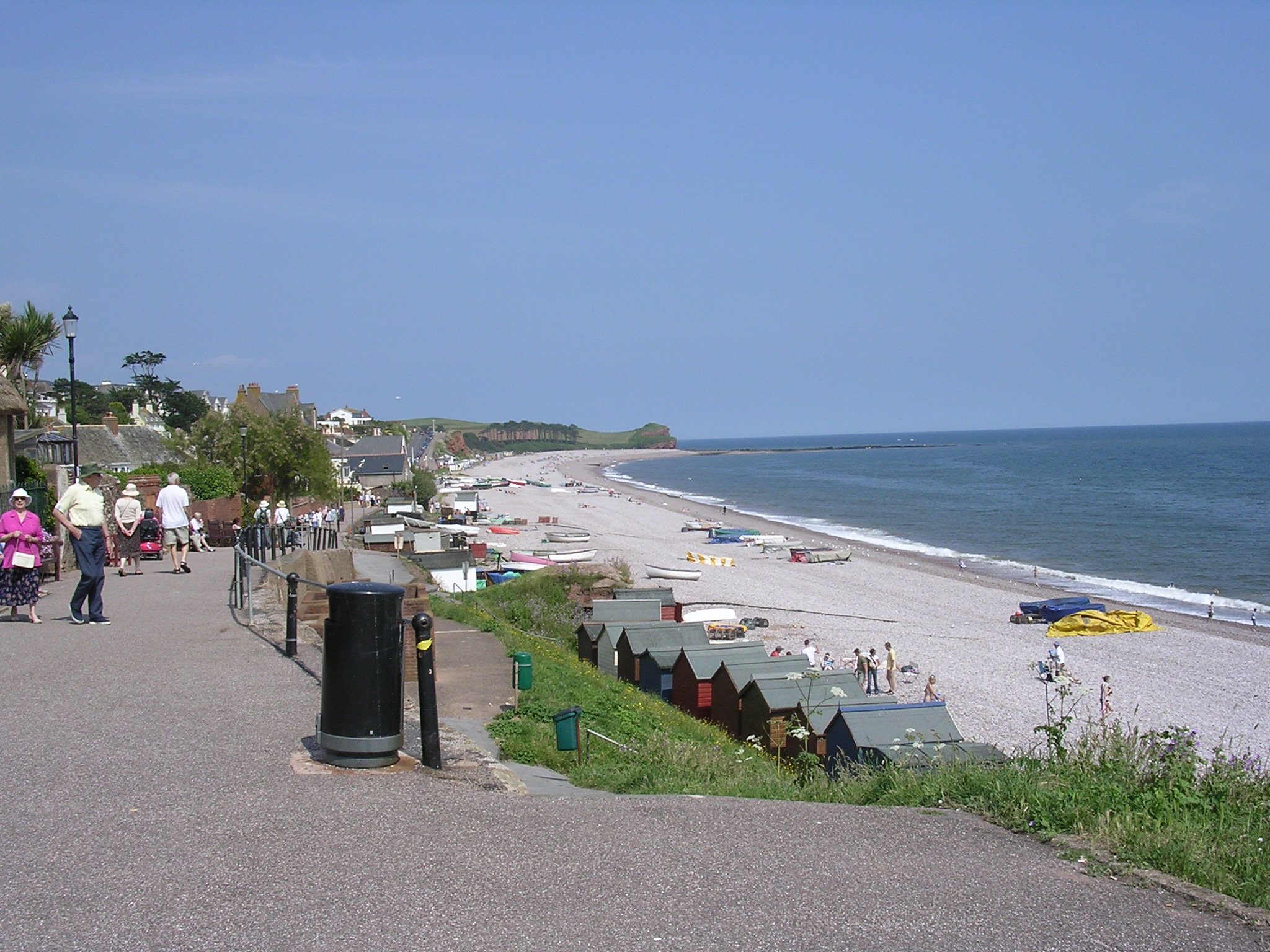
The sea front, looking east towards Sidmouth

Budleigh Salterton, commonly known locally as "Budleigh", is a seaside town on the coast in East Devon, England, approximately 15 miles (24 km) south-east of Exeter and 8 miles (13 km) east of Exmouth. The town had a population of 5,240 at the 2021 census.

It lies within the East Devon National Landscape (formerly designated as an Area of Outstanding Natural Beauty), and forms part of the Budleigh Salterton electoral ward. The ward had a population of 7,671 at the 2021 census.

== Geography ==
Budleigh Salterton lies at the mouth of the River Otter, where the estuary meets the sea at the town’s pebble beach. The river flows through a low-lying coastal plain before entering the English Channel.

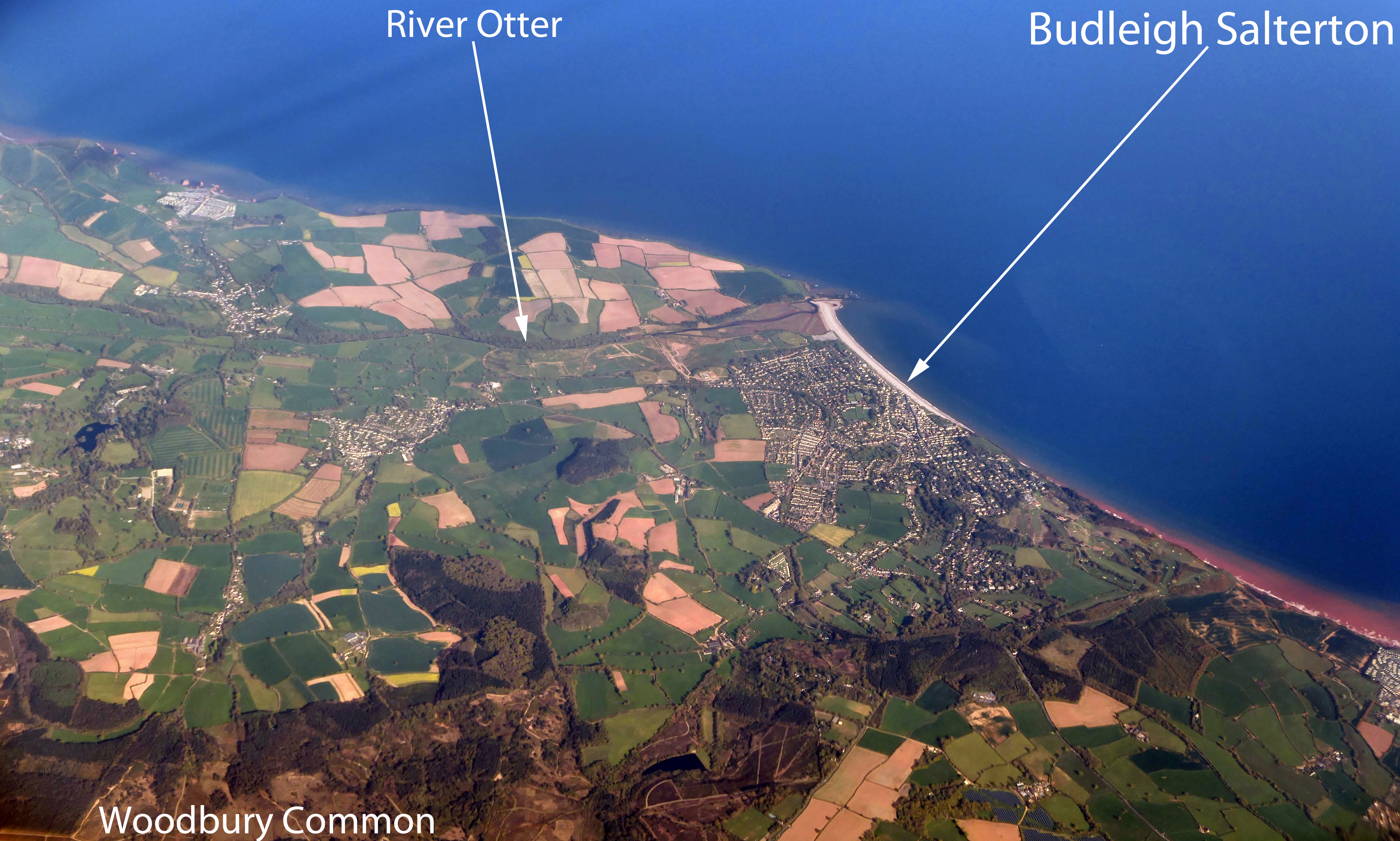
Aerial view of Budleigh Salterton and the surrounding countryside.

The South West Coast Path passes through the town, providing clifftop routes eastwards to Sidmouth and westwards to Exmouth.

== Geology ==
Budleigh Salterton forms part of the Jurassic Coast World Heritage Site, recognised for its geological exposures spanning the Triassic, Jurassic and Cretaceous periods.

The town is closely associated with the 'Budleigh Salterton Pebble Beds', a Triassic geological formation composed of well-rounded quartzite pebbles within a red sandstone matrix. These sediments were deposited approximately 250 million years ago in a high-energy fluvial environment and form part of the Permian–Triassic stratigraphy of south-west England.

The modern pebble beach is derived from erosion of these Pebble Beds and is characterised by its rounded flint and quartzite composition.

== Ecology ==
The River Otter estuary includes reed beds and grazing marsh that support a range of migratory and overwintering bird species. The area is designated as a Site of Special Scientific Interest due to its ecological and ornithological importance.

The estuary also contains saltmarsh and transitional habitats typical of relatively undisturbed south Devon coastal river systems. In recent years, sections of saltmarsh have undergone natural and assisted restoration following changes in flood defence management along the River Otter, allowing tidal processes to re-establish in parts of the lower estuary.

== History ==
Budleigh Salterton is recorded in the Domesday Book (1086) as part of the manor of Budleigh, held by the King. The wider area remained largely rural throughout the medieval period, with settlement based on agriculture and dispersed coastal holdings within the parish.

During the medieval and early modern periods, Budleigh Salterton remained a small fishing and farming settlement. The coastal environment and lack of major transport routes contributed to its relatively slow development compared with other south Devon towns.

=== 19th century development and tourism ===
The town developed significantly in the 19th century as seaside recreation and sea bathing became increasingly popular. The growth of Budleigh Salterton as a coastal resort was supported by improved regional transport links, including the opening of the Budleigh Salterton Railway in 1897, which connected the town to the wider London and South Western Railway network via Tipton St John and also provided interchange access towards Exmouth.

The railway was engineered as a lightly graded rural branch line and formed part of a wider network of coastal and inland connections in East Devon. Despite this improved accessibility, Budleigh Salterton remained smaller and less commercialised than nearby resorts such as Exmouth.

During the Victorian and Edwardian periods, the town saw the construction of villas, guesthouses, and small hotels, reflecting its growing popularity with visitors. The pebble beach and distinctive red sandstone cliffs also became noted features of the town’s identity, later contributing to its inclusion within the Jurassic Coast geological landscape designation.

The railway line was closed in 1967 as part of the Beeching closures.

== Governance ==
Budleigh Salterton is a civil parish within the district of East Devon and the county of Devon. Local government services are provided by East Devon District Council and Devon County Council.

At parish level, the town is represented by Budleigh Salterton Town Council, which is responsible for local amenities and community matters.

The town is part of the Exmouth and Exeter East constituency in the House of Commons of the United Kingdom.

== Demographics ==
At the 2021 census, the population of the Budleigh Salterton built-up area was 5,240, while the wider Budleigh & Raleigh ward had a population of 7,671.

Age structure of Budleigh Salterton Parish (2021 Census)
Age group	Percentage of population
0–17	~12%
18–64	~43%
65–74	~25%
75+	~20%

The age structure shows a population significantly older than the England average, with around 45% of residents aged 65 and over. The proportion of younger residents is correspondingly lower than national averages.

== Economy ==
Budleigh Salterton has a service-based economy, with tourism, retail, and local services forming the principal economic activities. The town’s coastal location and proximity to the Jurassic Coast contribute to seasonal visitor activity.

Tourism is largely associated with the town’s beach, coastal scenery, and access to walking routes including the South West Coast Path. Visitor activity is predominantly seasonal and focused on day trips and short stays rather than large-scale resort tourism.

A significant proportion of the population is retired, and this demographic profile supports demand for residential care, healthcare, and local service provision. As a result, health and social care form an important component of the local economy.

There is limited industrial or manufacturing activity in the town. Many residents commute to nearby employment centres, including Exmouth and Exeter, reflecting Budleigh Salterton’s role within the wider East Devon commuter belt.

== Education ==
Budleigh Salterton is served by Budleigh Salterton Primary School, which provides primary education for the town and surrounding area.

For secondary education, pupils typically attend schools in nearby towns such as Exmouth or Ottery St Mary, reflecting the town’s integration into wider East Devon school catchment areas.

== Recreation ==
The town includes a designated area for naturists. The naturist section is located at the western end of the beach and is informally recognised within the wider recreational use of the shoreline.

The beach is otherwise publicly accessible and used for walking, sea bathing, and access to the South West Coast Path. The relatively undeveloped nature of the coastline reflects the wider character of the East Devon coast.

== Culture and community ==
Fairlynch Museum is housed in a listed, thatched marine cottage orné dating from 1811. It interprets the history and geology of the Budleigh Salterton area and the wider East Devon coast, and opened as a museum in 1967. It also holds a local archive and a collection of period costume.

The town has a male-voice choir which performs at concerts and charitable events.

Budleigh Salterton hosts an annual classical music festival in the summer months, as well as a literary festival held in the autumn.

The town’s cultural activity is closely associated with its coastal setting and its role as a small residential and visitor destination within the East Devon area.

== Transport ==
Budleigh Salterton is located on the B3178 road, with the B3179 terminating on the western edge of the town.

The town is served by bus services linking it with Exmouth and Sidmouth, with less frequent services to Exeter.

The town was previously served by a railway station on the Budleigh Salterton Railway, which closed in 1967. The nearest railway station is now at Exmouth, approximately 5 miles (8 km) away.

Parts of the former railway route have been repurposed as walking and cycling paths connecting Exmouth and Budleigh Salterton.

== Sports ==
Budleigh Salterton is home to the East Devon Golf Club.

The town has a croquet club founded in the late 19th century, which also provides facilities for bowls and bridge. It is among the older croquet clubs in England.

Budleigh Salterton Association Football Club fields multiple teams, including a first team competing in the South West Peninsula League Division One East, as well as reserve, women’s and youth sides.

The town also has a cricket club and a rifle club, and there are recreational facilities for tennis, bowls, and other local sporting activities.

== Churches ==
The Church of England parish church of Budleigh Salterton is St Peter’s Church. The town originally had a chapel of ease serving the parish of All Saints, East Budleigh, but this was replaced as the settlement expanded. St Peter’s Church was built between 1891 and 1893 to a design by George Fellowes Prynne, and became the parish church in 1901.

The church was severely damaged during an air raid on 17 April 1942, including the loss of many stained glass windows made by Percy Bacon & Brothers. It was restored and reopened in 1953.

The parish is now part of the Raleigh Mission Community, which includes St Peter’s, Budleigh Salterton, All Saints, East Budleigh, and St Michael’s, Otterton.

The town also has a Roman Catholic church dedicated to St Peter, a Baptist church whose congregation dates to 1843, and the Temple Methodist Church, completed in 1904 to replace an earlier chapel founded in 1812 by the bookseller James Lackington, a supporter of John Wesley.

== Notable people ==
In birth order:

- James Lackington (1746–1815), bookseller and founder of Temple Methodist Church.
- Edward Capern (1819–1894), postman and poet known as the "Rural Postman of Bideford", is recorded in biographical sources as having spent part of his later life in south Devon, including the Budleigh Salterton area.
- Sir John Everett Millais (1829–1896), painter and founding member of the Pre-Raphaelite Brotherhood, is associated with East Devon in his later career, though no strong primary biographical sources confirm residence in Budleigh Salterton specifically.

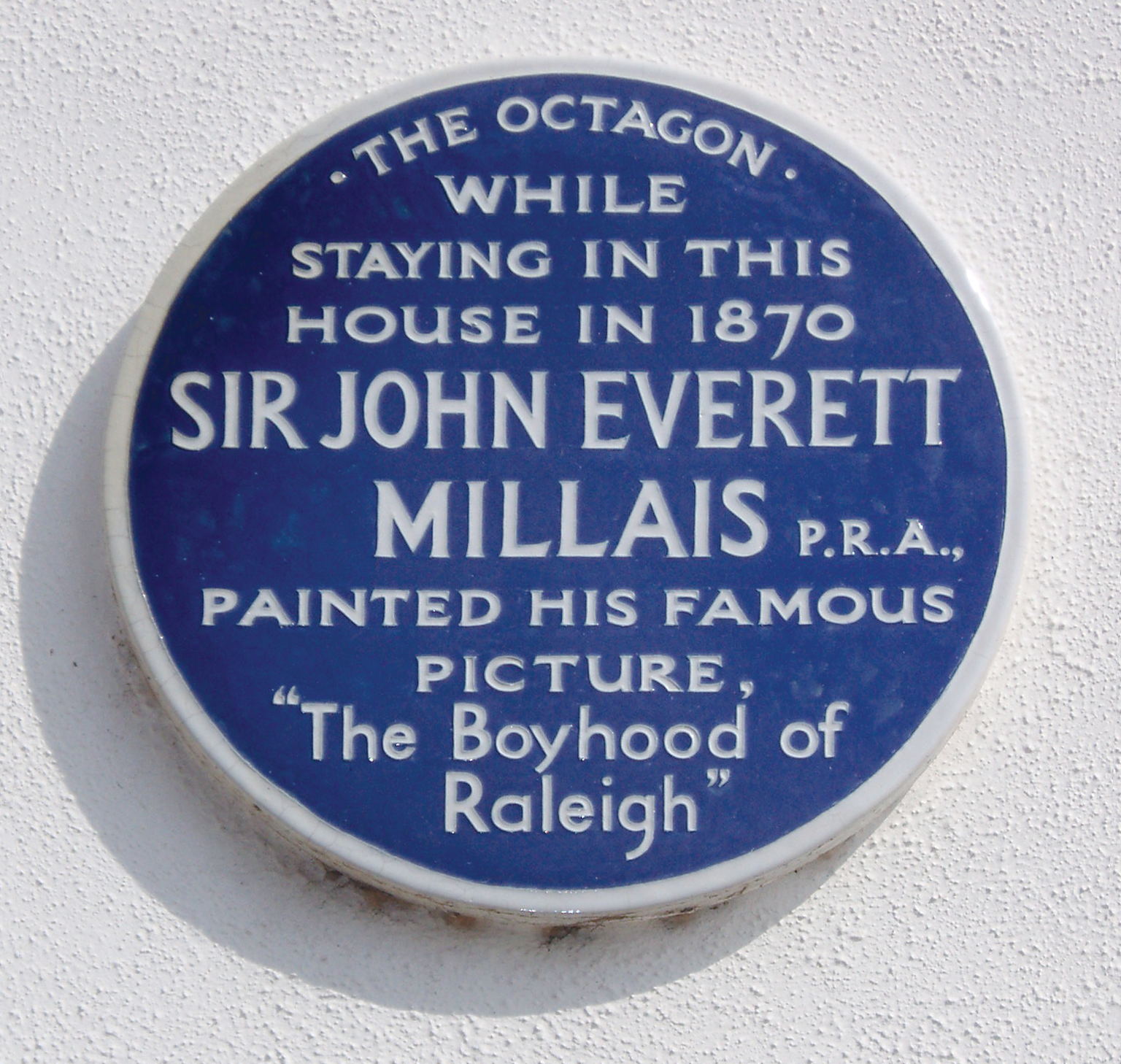
Blue plaque commemorating Sir John Everett Millais

- Hubert von Herkomer (1849–1914), German-born British painter and art professor, died at Budleigh Salterton in 1914.
- Charles Warrell (1889–1995), creator of the I-Spy children's book series, lived in the town from his retirement in 1956 until his death.
- V. C. Clinton-Baddeley (1900–1970), playwright, detective novelist and theatre historian, was born in Budleigh Salterton.
- Belinda Lee (1935–1961), British film actress, was born in Budleigh Salterton. Her father managed a hotel in the town.
- Dame Hilary Mantel (1952–2022), novelist, author of Wolf Hall and Bring Up the Bodies, lived in Budleigh Salterton.
