= Tipton St Johns railway station =

Railway station in Devon, England (1874–1967)

Tipton St John's
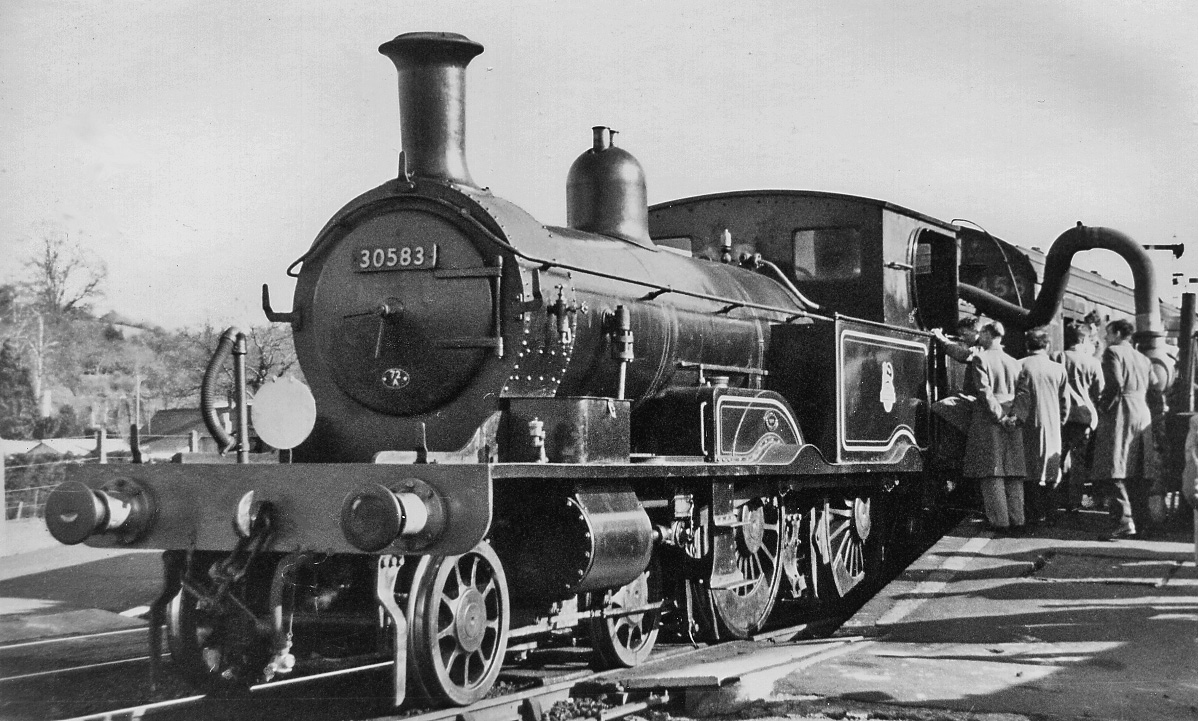
- EX-LSW 4-4-2T on Rail Tour in 1953

General information
- Location: Tipton St John, East Devon; England
- Coordinates: 50.7188°N 3.2892°W
- Platforms: 2

Other information
- Status: Disused

History
- Original company: Sidmouth Railway
- Pre-grouping: London and South Western Railway
- Post-grouping: Southern Railway

Key dates
- 6 July 1874: Opened as Tipton
- 2 January 1881: Renamed as Tipton St John's
- 6 March 1967: Closed
Location

Tipton St John's railway station is a closed railway station that served the village Tipton St John in Devon, England. It was opened in 1874 and later served as the junction for the Budleigh Salterton Railway, but was closed to passengers in 1967 due to the Beeching Axe.

== History ==
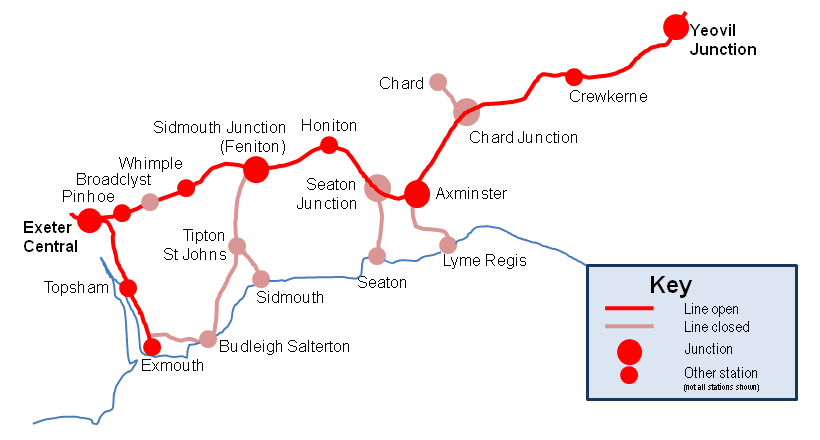
Local railway lines

The station was originally opened on 6 July 1874 as Tipton when the Sidmouth Railway opened between Sidmouth Junction (now Feniton) on the London and South Western Railway (LSWR) line from Yeovil Junction to Exeter Queen Street and terminated at Sidmouth.

The station originally had two platforms either side of a passing loop, there was one siding with a head shunt to the west, extending behind the station building.

The station was renamed Tipton St John's on 2 January 1881. The station expanded in 1897, when it became a junction as the Budleigh Salterton Railway opened the line to Budleigh Salterton. Additional sidings either side of the running line were provided, there was a signal box and a footbridge linking the platforms.

A camping coach was positioned here by the Southern Region from 1954 to 1964, and probably for some of the summers from 1948 to 1953. From 1961 a Pullman camping coach was here.

The station closed to passengers on 6 March 1967 and freight services were withdrawn from the line on 8 May 1967.

== Present state ==
The station building and platform remain as private accommodation known as station house.

Preceding station	Disused railways	Following station
Ottery St Mary; Line and station closed	BR Southern Region; Sidmouth Railway	Sidmouth; Line and station closed
Ottery St Mary; Line and station closed	BR Southern Region; Budleigh Salterton Railway	Newton Poppleford; Line and station closed
