= Sidmouth railway station =

Disused railway station in Devon, England

Coordinates: 50.6897°N 3.2455°W

Sidmouth
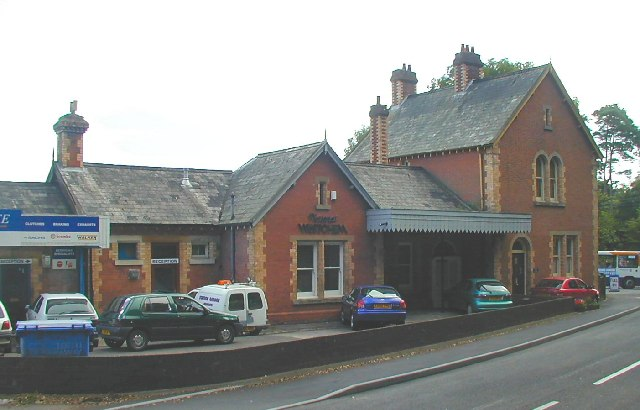
- Station House (formerly station)

General information
- Location: Sidmouth, East Devon; England
- Platforms: 2

Other information
- Status: Disused

History
- Original company: London and South Western Railway
- Post-grouping: Southern Railway

Key dates
- 6 July 1874: Station opens
- 6 March 1967: Station closes to passengers
- 8 May 1967: station closes for freight
Location

Sidmouth railway station was a railway station located in Sidmouth, Devon, England until its closure in 1967. The station is now a privately owned property at the top of Alexandria Road, Sidmouth. The line was part of the Southern Railway, a branch off the Salisbury to Exeter route (West of England Main Line) at Sidmouth Junction.

== History ==
The station opened on 6 July 1874, built and operated by the Sidmouth Railway Company to satisfy the needs of visitors to the resort.

The railway station was located 1 1/2 miles (2.4 km) away from the seafront and town centre.

Initially there were seven trains per day, but this increased to 24 in the 1930s. Passenger numbers remained viable well into the 1950s, but rail service rationalisation in the 1960s significantly reduced the frequency of train services. The consequent reduction in passenger numbers led inevitably to closure of the branch line; passenger services ceased on 6 March 1967 and freight services continued up to the line closure on 8 May 1967. The railway track was lifted shortly after this.

There were two platforms: one could hold five coaches, and the other seven. Occasionally a longer train would arrive, and would need to be split between the platforms.

The goods yard was located directly next to the passenger station; goods traffic was always light and consisted mainly of agricultural goods and coal for the nearby gasworks.

== The station today ==
The building's railway heritage is still clear, as can be seen from the photograph of the front of the building which was the original entrance to the ticket office and waiting rooms. Inside the building there remains part of the platform and the ornate metal roof supports. The site has been completely redeveloped with a builders merchant built on the goods yard and an industrial estate on the passenger lines; a housing development (Bulverton Park, Bulverton) has been built on the trackbed to the north of the station.

Since the closure of this station, Sidmouth's nearest railway station is Honiton railway station, 9 miles (14 km) away.

Preceding station	Disused railways	Following station
Tipton St Johns; Line and station closed	British Rail; Southern Region; Sidmouth Railway	Terminus
