= Littleham railway station =

Former railway station in Devon, England

Littleham
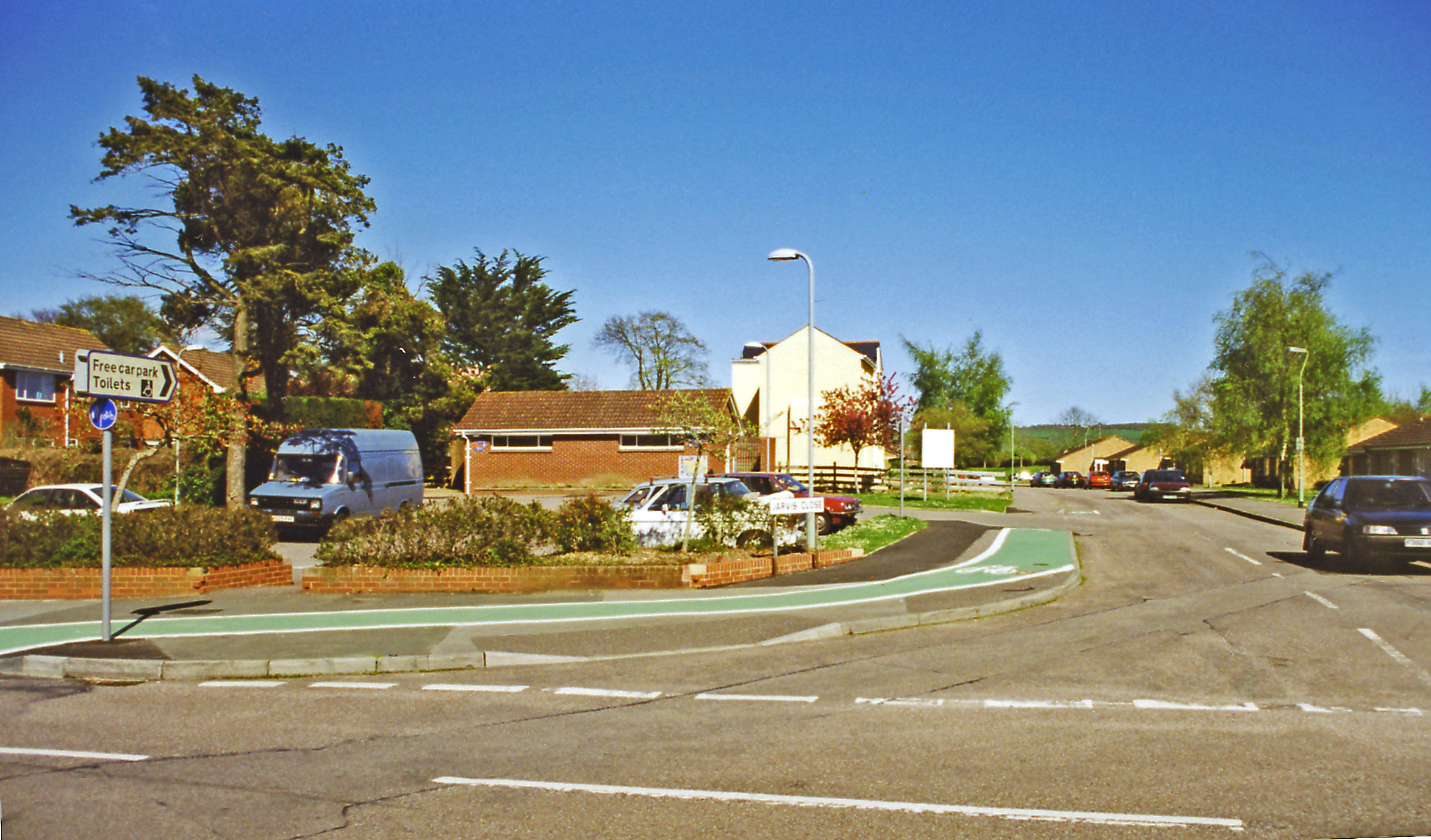
- Littleham station site

General information
- Location: Littleham, East Devon; England
- Coordinates: 50.6240°N 3.3868°W
- Platforms: 2

Other information
- Status: Disused

History
- Original company: London and South Western Railway
- Post-grouping: Southern Railway

Key dates
- 1 June 1903: Opened
- 6 March 1967: Closed
Location

Littleham railway station served the village of Littleham, in Devon, England between 1903 and 1967. It was on the Budleigh Salterton Railway between Tipton St Johns to Exmouth.

== History ==
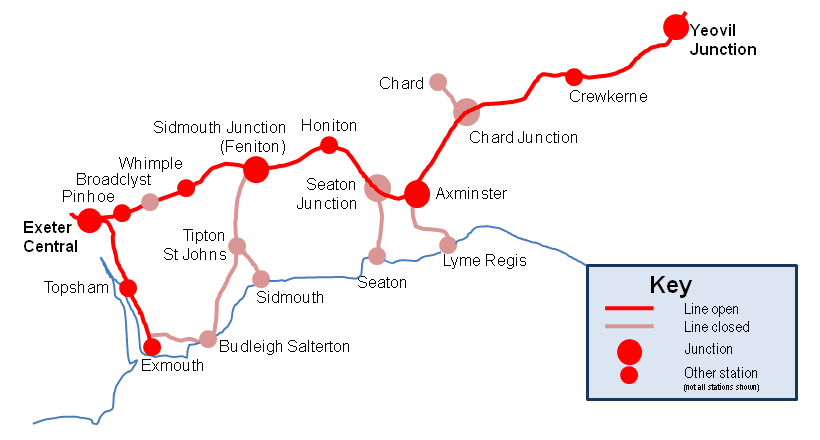
A historical map of local railway lines

Littleham station was opened on 1 June 1903 by the London and South Western Railway, when it opened the extension of the Budleigh Salterton Railway from Budleigh Salterton to Exmouth.

It had two platforms on either side of a passing loop and there was a signal box and a goods yard to the south of the station. The goods yard was capable of handling most goods including live stock and was equipped with a two-ton crane.

The station was host to a Southern Railway camping coach from 1937 to 1939. Three camping coaches were positioned here by the Southern Region from 1954 to 1960; four Pullman camping coaches in 1962 were reduced to two for 1963 and 1964.

The station was closed when the line closed on 6 March 1967.

Preceding station	Disused railways	Following station
Budleigh Salterton; Line and station closed	British Rail; Southern Region; Budleigh Salterton Railway	Exmouth; Line closed, station open

== The site today ==
Only the stationmaster's house remains as a private dwelling; the rest of the site has been redeveloped as road and housing.
