= Ottery St Mary railway station =

Disused railway station in Devon, England

Ottery St Mary

General information
- Location: Ottery St Mary, East Devon; England
- Coordinates: 50.7489°N 3.2874°W
- Platforms: 2

Other information
- Status: Disused

History
- Original company: Sidmouth Railway
- Pre-grouping: London and South Western Railway
- Post-grouping: Southern Railway

Key dates
- 1874: Opened
- 6 March 1967: Closed for passengers
- 8 May 1967: Closed for freight
Location

Ottery St Mary railway station is a closed railway station that served the town of Ottery St Mary, in Devon, England. It was opened in 1874 on the Sidmouth Railway, but was closed in 1967 due to the Beeching Axe.

== History ==
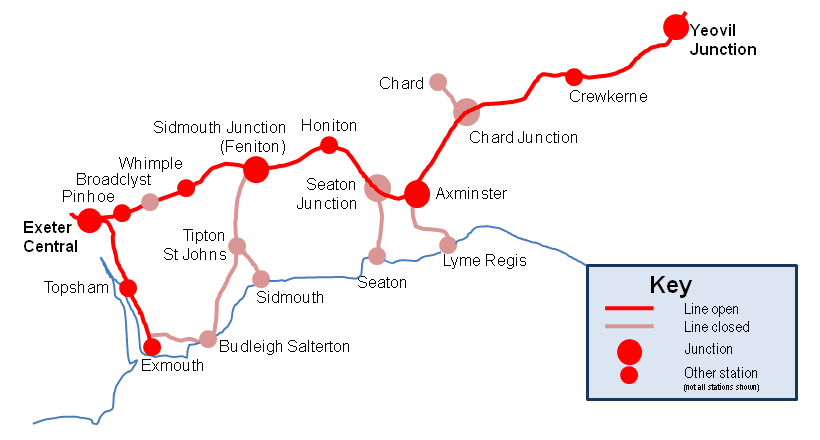
Local railway lines

The station originally opened as Ottery St Mary town, probably to distinguish from Sidmouth Junction, which was originally named Ottery St Mary and Ottery road.

Passenger and freight services were withdrawn in 1967.

== Present state ==
The station building is now a youth club. The remaining site is now an industrial estate.

Preceding station	Disused railways	Following station
Sidmouth Junction; Line closed, station open	British Rail; Southern Region; Sidmouth Railway	Tipton St Johns; Line and station closed
