= St Margaret and St Andrew's Church, Littleham, Exmouth =

Church in Devon, England

St Margaret and St Andrew's Church, Littleham
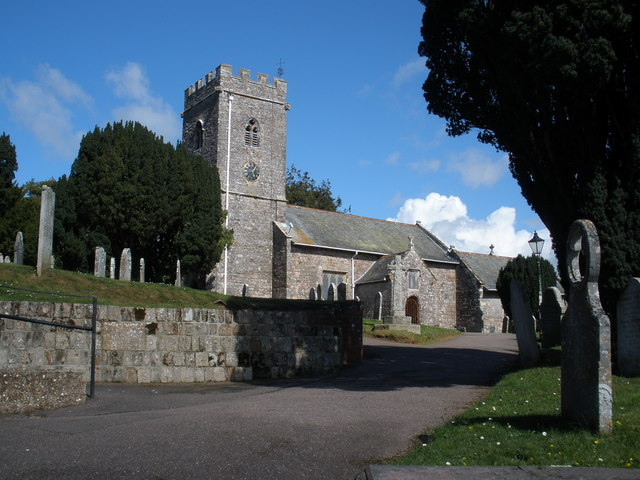
- St Margaret and St Andrew's Church, Littleham
- St Margaret and St Andrew's Church, Littleham
- 50°37′23.87″N 3°22′25.56″W
- OS grid reference: SY 02909 81296
- Location: Littleham, Exmouth
- Country: England
- Denomination: Church of England
- Website: exmouthcoastalchurches.org.uk

Administration
- Diocese: Diocese of Exeter
- Archdeaconry: Exeter
- Deanery: Aylesbeare

St Margaret and St Andrew's Church, Littleham, Exmouth is a Grade II* listed parish church in the Church of England in Littleham, Exmouth.

== History ==
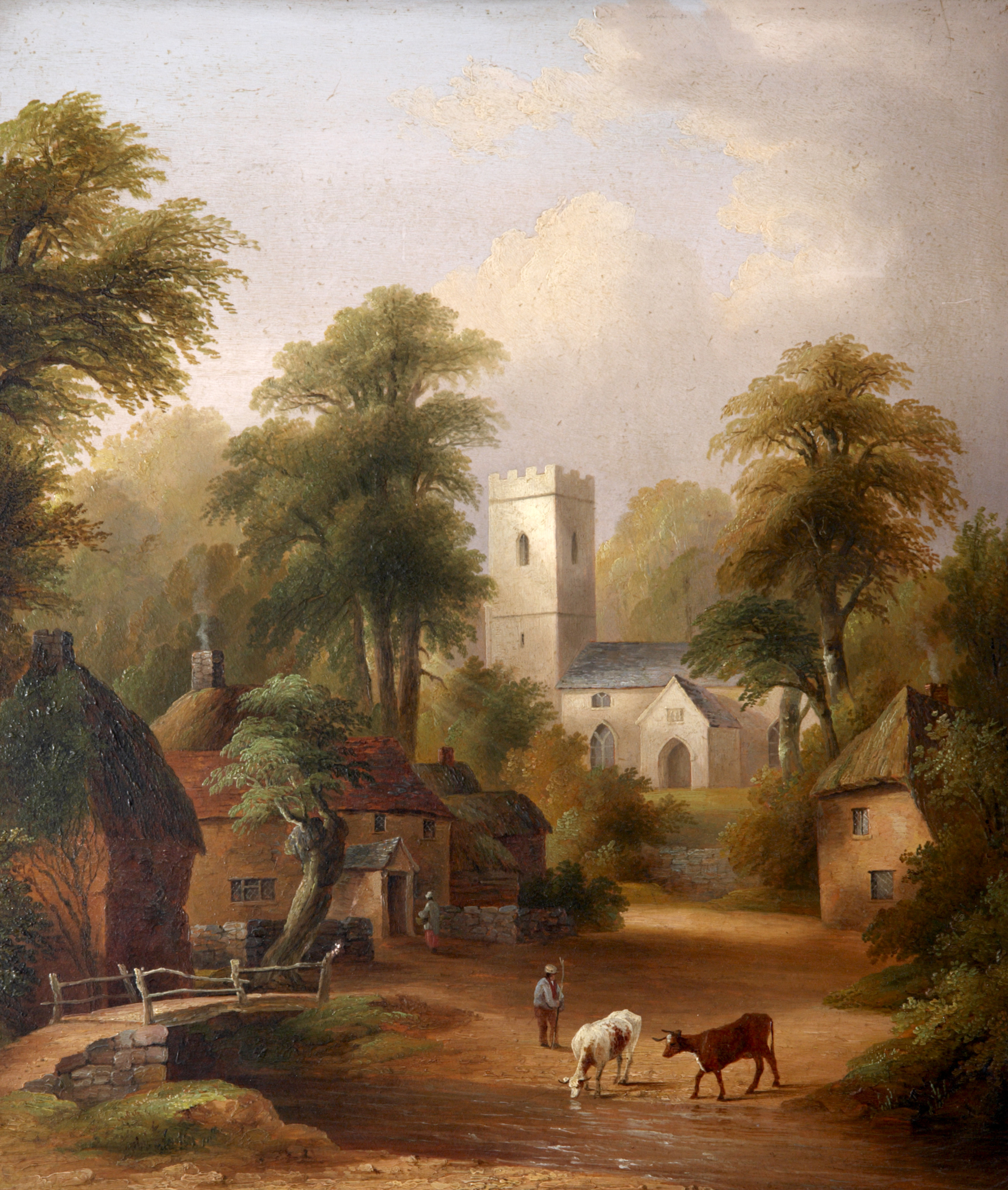
1867 painting of Littleham by John Wallace Tucker, depicting the parish church of St Margaret and St Andrew and Littleham Brook.

The church is 13th century. The Drake family home was at Prattshayes, Maer Lane, and they paid for the North Aisle, known as Drakes Aisle, to be added in the 16th century. The church was heavily restored between 1883 and 1884 by Robert Medley Fulford. During this restoration some 15th century glass was discovered which depicts St Roche (patron saint of plague sufferers), Archangel Michael vanquishing the serpent and Christ indicating his wounds. These fragments were set into plain quarries in a window in the north aisle. The south aisle windows are by Percy Bacon & Brothers.

Frances Nelson, wife of Lord Nelson, is buried in the churchyard, as is Admiral of the Fleet Sir Fairfax Moresby, whom Port Moresby, the capital of Papua New Guinea, is named after.

The church is united in a single parish with Holy Trinity Church, Exmouth.

== Organ ==
The organ is by Norman and Beard. A specification of the organ can be found on the National Pipe Organ Register.
