= Newton Poppleford railway station =

Disused railway station in Devon, England

Coordinates: 50.7010°N 3.2911°W

Newton Poppleford

General information
- Location: Newton Poppleford, East Devon; England
- Platforms: 1

Other information
- Status: Disused

History
- Original company: Budleigh Salterton Railway
- Pre-grouping: London and South Western Railway
- Post-grouping: Southern Railway

Key dates
- 1 June 1899: Opened
- 6 March 1967: Closed
Location

Newton Poppleford railway station is a closed railway station that served the village of Newton Poppleford in East Devon, England. The station was opened by the Budleigh Salterton Railway on 1 June 1899 and closed by British Railways on 6 March 1967.

== History ==
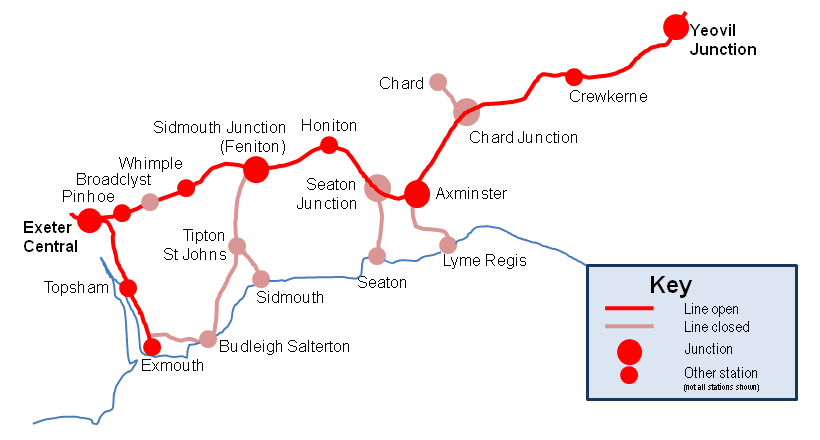
Local railway lines

The station was opened as a small station on the Budleigh Salterton Railway.

The station was host to a Southern Railway camping coach from 1935 to 1939. A camping coach was also positioned here by the Southern Region from 1954 to 1964.

Goods facilities were withdrawn in 1964 and the station was downgraded as a halt. The station was completely closed in 1967.

== Present state ==
The station and the bridge over the A3052 road have both since been demolished, with no tangible evidence remaining.

Preceding station	Disused railways	Following station
Tipton St Johns; Line and station closed	British Rail; Southern Region; Budleigh Salterton Railway	East Budleigh; Line and station closed

== Bibliography ==
- McRae, Andrew (1997). British Railway Camping Coach Holidays: The 1930s & British Railways (London Midland Region). Vol. Scenes from the Past: 30 (Part One). Foxline. ISBN 1-870119-48-7.
- McRae, Andrew (1998). British Railways Camping Coach Holidays: A Tour of Britain in the 1950s and 1960s. Vol. Scenes from the Past: 30 (Part Two). Foxline. ISBN 1-870119-53-3.
- Quick, Michael (2022) [2001]. Railway passenger stations in Great Britain: a chronology (PDF). version 5.04. Railway & Canal Historical Society. Archived from the original (PDF) on 25 November 2022.
