= Tipton St John =

Village in Devon, England

Coordinates: 50.718063°N 3.287241°W

- Location within Devon
- OS grid reference: SY092917
- District: East Devon
- Shire county: Devon
- Region: South West
- Country: England
- Sovereign state: United Kingdom
- Post town: SIDMOUTH
- Postcode district: EX10
- Police: Devon and Cornwall
- Fire: Devon and Somerset
- Ambulance: South Western
- UK Parliament: Honiton and Sidmouth

Tipton St John is a village in the civil parish of Ottery St Mary in the English county Devon. It has a population of around 350. The village is built on rising ground overlooking the River Otter.

== Railway ==
Between the village and the river lies the site of the former Tipton St John's railway station, closed in 1967. The station was the junction between the Sidmouth Railway and the Budleigh Salterton Railway from 1897.

== Facilities ==
The village has a pub called the Golden Lion and had a post office until 2008, when it was closed. The village primary school has 97 students and 16 staff and is administered by Devon County Council. The village also has a Scout group 1st Tipton St John Scouts, which has included Beavers, Cubs, Scouts and Explorers.
