= Budleigh Salterton railway station =

Disused railway station in Devon, England

Budleigh Salterton
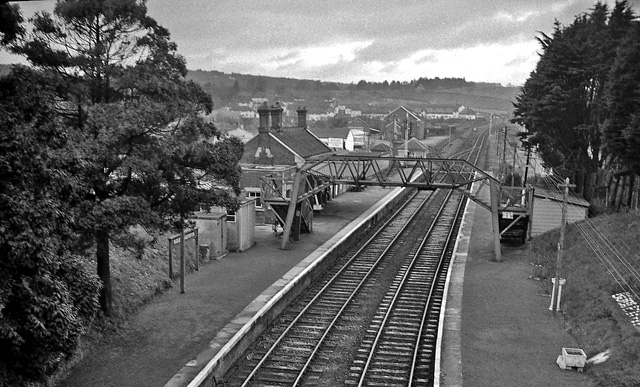

General information
- Location: Budleigh Salterton, East Devon; England
- Coordinates: 50.6342°N 3.3268°W
- Platforms: 2

Other information
- Status: Disused

History
- Original company: London and South Western Railway
- Post-grouping: Southern Railway

Key dates
- 15 May 1897: Opened as Salterton
- 27 April 1898: renamed
- 6 March 1967: Closed
Location

Budleigh Salterton railway station is a closed railway station that served the town of Budleigh Salterton in Devon, England. It was opened by the London and South Western Railway (LSWR) in 1897 but was closed to passengers in 1967 due to the Beeching Axe.

== History ==
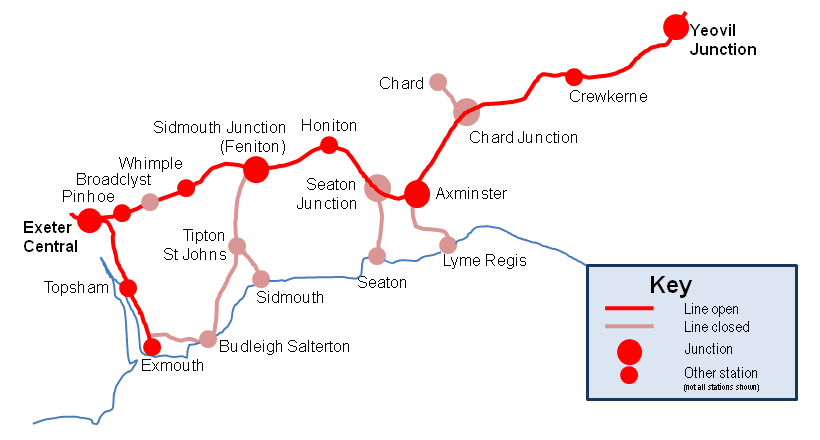
Local railway lines

The station was originally opened as Salterton, a terminus on the Budleigh Salterton Railway. The station was expanded in 1903 when the line was extended to Exmouth, which formed a loop.

Passenger services were withdrawn on 6 March 1967, when the Sidmouth Junction to Exmouth line was closed to all traffic (goods traffic had already been withdrawn in 1964).

== Present state ==
The track was subsequently lifted by 1969, but the station site remained derelict but intact until the late 1970s. It was then cleared and redeveloped for housing - as such, no trace remains today.

| Preceding station | Disused railways | Following station |
|---|---|---|
| East Budleigh; Line and station closed | British Rail; Southern Region; Budleigh Salterton Railway | Littleham; Line and station closed |
