= Holy Trinity Church, Exmouth =

Church in Devon, England

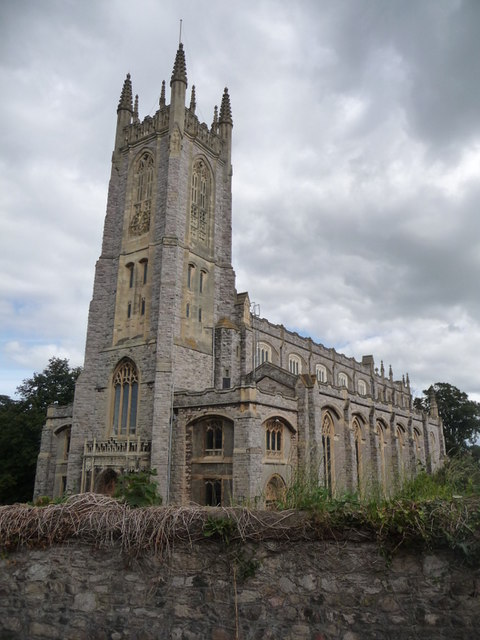
- Holy Trinity Church, Exmouth
- Holy Trinity Church, Exmouth
- 50°37′1.31″N 3°24′42.80″W
- OS grid reference: SY 00211 80659
- Location: Exmouth
- Country: England
- Denomination: Church of England
- Website: littlehamcumexmouth.org.uk

Architecture
- Groundbreaking: 1824
- Completed: 1825
- Construction cost: £13,000

Administration
- Diocese: Diocese of Exeter
- Archdeaconry: Exeter
- Deanery: Aylesbeare

Holy Trinity Church, Exmouth is a Grade II* listed parish church in the Church of England in Exmouth.

== History ==
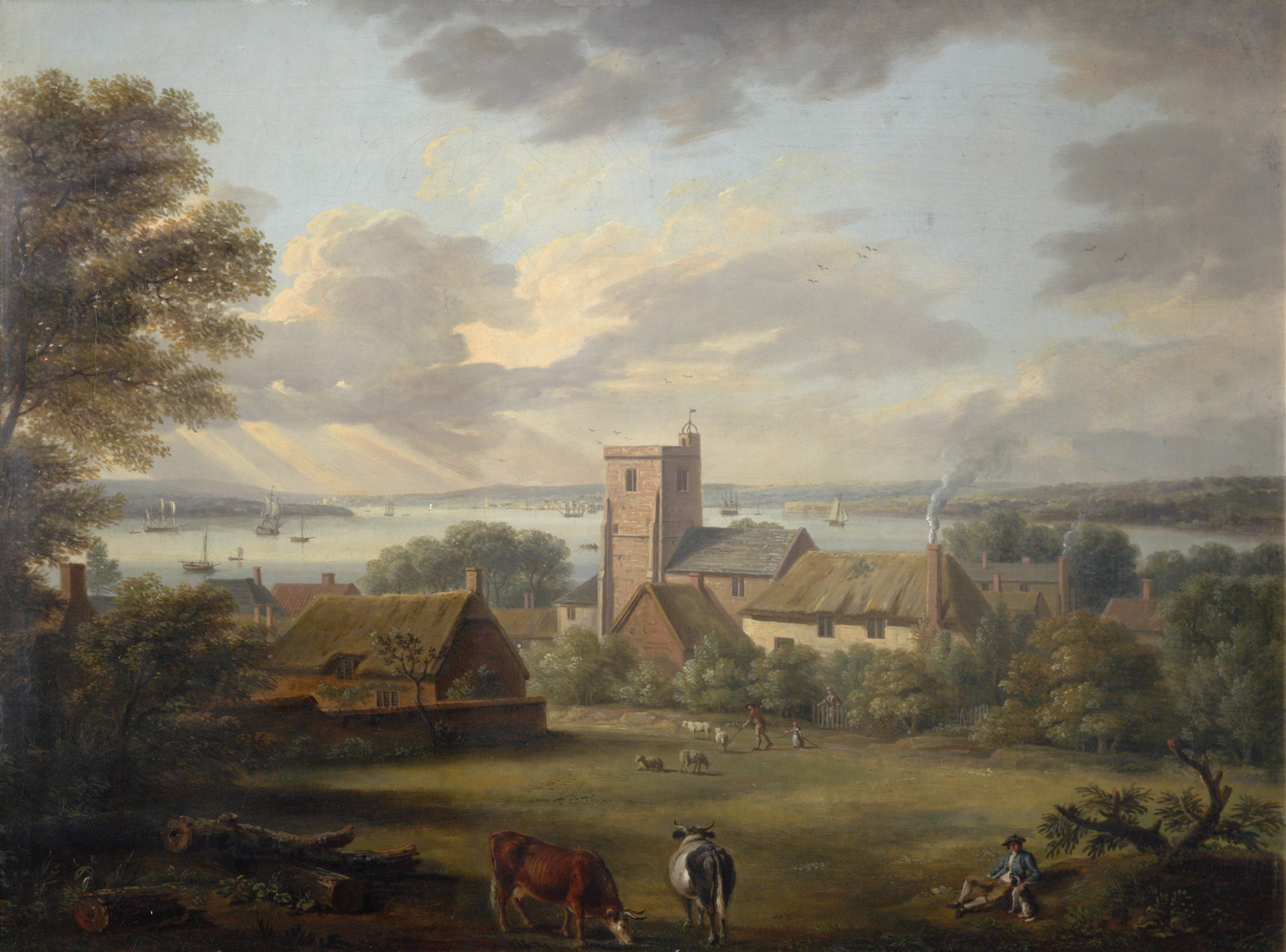
Holy Trinity Church Exmouth by Coplestone Warre Bampfylde, 1771

The church was built between 1824 and 1825 by John Rolle, 1st Baron Rolle at the cost of £13,000. The chancel was added by Lady Rolle in 1856. It was described by the Building News and Engineering Journal in May of 1916 as, "a sample of the worst type of so-called Gothic churches built about 1830, and consisted of a brick and stucco building, with columns constructed partly in stone and partly in cast-iron, cement-moulded arches, with clerestory above, and a flat lath-and-plaster, imitation-groined roof. By the turn of the 20th century the church had fallen into disrepair and was poorly maintained, so John Rolle's nephew, Mark Rolle, commissioned a total re-modelling between 1905 and 1907, appointing Devon Architect George Halford Fellowes Prynne to carry out the works.

In February 1942 German aircraft dropped three bombs which exploded in the area of The Beacon. One bomb, at 1 Bicton Place to the north west of the church tragically killed five people. A great deal of the glazing in the north and south of the nave, much of which had been executed by Percy Bacon & Brothers, was badly damaged. Only the east window and those in the Lady Chapel on the east side of the north transept survived intact.

The church is united in a single parish with St Margaret and St Andrew's Church, Littleham, Exmouth.

== Organ ==
The organ from the original church was expanded in 1878 by H.P. Dicker, and was restored in 1909. This was rebuilt and expanded in 1953 by John Compton. A specification of the organ can be found on the National Pipe Organ Register.
