= Frances Nelson, Viscountess Nelson =

Wife of Horatio Nelson (1758–1831)

The Right Honourable The Viscountess Nelson
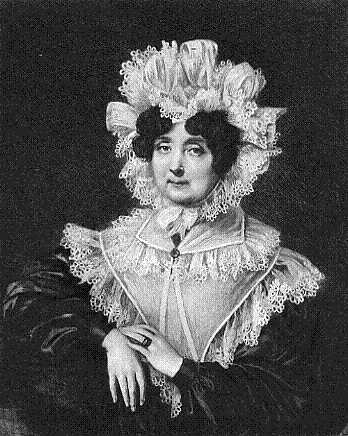
- Born: Frances Herbert Woolward; 2 December 1758; Nevis, British Leeward Islands, British Empire
- Died: 4 May 1831 (aged 72); Harley Street, London, England, UK
- Resting place: St Margaret and St Andrew's Church, Littleham, Exmouth, Devon, England, UK
- Other name: Frances Nisbet
- Spouses: Josiah Nisbet (m. 1779; died 1781) Horatio Nelson (m. 1787; died 1805)
- Children: 1

Frances Nelson, Viscountess Nelson, Duchess of Bronte (Note: Title in the nobility of Sicily.) (née Frances Herbert Woolward, formerly Nisbet; 1758 – 4 May 1831) was the wife of Horatio Nelson, the British naval officer who won several victories over both the French and Spanish during the French Revolutionary and Napoleonic Wars.

Born to wealthy parents on Nevis, she was orphaned at 21, and married a doctor, Josiah Nisbet. The couple returned to England, UK, but her new husband died there, and Frances returned to Nevis to live with her uncle, a prominent politician of the island. There she met Horatio Nelson, and married him in 1787. The couple moved to England, and Fanny established a household and cared for her husband's elderly father while Nelson was at sea. She was, by all accounts, a devoted wife, but in time Horatio met Emma Hamilton while serving in the Mediterranean, and the two embarked in a highly public affair. Fanny became estranged from her husband, who refused all contact with her through to his death at the Battle of Trafalgar in 1805. Despite this, Fanny remained devoted to his memory for the rest of her life.

== Family and early life ==
Frances, also known by her nickname as "Fanny" was born on the Caribbean island of Nevis in the Lesser Antilles in 1758, and baptized as Frances Herbert Woolward at the St. George's Church in May 1761. The Woolward family were the highest and most powerful members of the British colonial elite: her mother, Mary Herbert/Woolword, was one of three sisters of John Richardson Herbert, a descendant of the courtier Phillip Herbert, fourth Earl of Pembroke, and Mary and John's uncle had been President of the Council of Nevis position until his death in 1768. Frances father, William Woolward, was a senior judge on Nevis, and a partner in the firm of Herbert, Morton and Woolward. The Woolwards lived in comfort, and Fanny herself owned a black slave named Cato.

Fanny's mother died while Fanny was still a child and her father succumbed to tetanus in February 1779, at the age of 53. Fanny inherited most of her father's possessions, but was forced to sell most of them to creditors. She raised a tablet to her parents' memory in the local church, and on 28 June 1779 married the 31-year-old physician Dr Josiah Nisbet.

Josiah had connections with the political elite of the island, and was probably fairly wealthy. The couple moved to England and lived briefly in the close at Salisbury Cathedral. Josiah Nisbet became seriously ill shortly after arriving in England and died on 5 October 1781, leaving Fanny with their seventeen-month-old child Josiah, but with no other provision. Fanny raised a plaque in her dead husband's memory at the St. Lawrence Church in Stratford Sub Castle, near Salisbury, and spent some time in England acting as the guardian of the children of another Nevis planter, John Pinney. Pinney returned to England in 1783 and did not recognise his children, prompting Fanny to exclaim "Good God! Don't you know them? They are your children!" Pinney's wife was so surprised that she set her headdress alight on a nearby candle.

== Return to Nevis ==
Fanny and her infant son returned to Nevis and lived with her uncle, John Richardson Herbert, at his house Montpelier. Herbert was by now himself President of the Council of Nevis, and one of the frequent guests to his house was a young naval captain who was stationed off the island, Horatio Nelson.

The widowed Fanny was described as young and pretty, while her availability and position as likely to inherit a substantial portion of her uncle's estate made her an attractive match for Nelson. In addition to this she painted watercolours, embroidered, and spoke excellent French. Nelson's friend Prince William Henry wrote that she seemed "pretty and sensible", while William Hotham, then serving as a midshipman aboard HMS Solebay, recorded that she was "pretty, attractive, and a general favourite." Another midshipman reported that though she had "some beauty, and a freshness of countenance not common in that climate", her intellect was distinctly unremarkable.

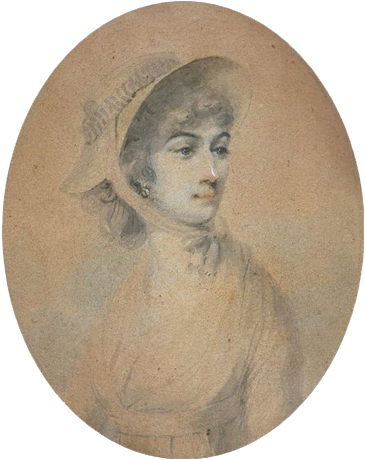
Miniature of Frances "Fanny" Nelson, watercolour on paper, painted in 1798 by Daniel Orme, the year of her husband's victory at the Nile

Nelson made frequent visits to Nevis after meeting Fanny for the first time, and by June 1785 had decided to ask her to marry him. By August Nelson had proposed, and Fanny had accepted, but there was still the question of obtaining the blessing of the relatives, and of raising money. Fanny's uncle promised them money on his death but could give them little in the short term; Nelson's relations also could not provide material support in the immediate future. By early 1786, Nelson had been moved to Barbados, where he engaged in legal struggles with the prize courts and other distractions, though he wrote often to Fanny on Nevis. He was able to return to Nevis in early 1787 while touring the islands with Prince William Henry, and there he determined to marry Fanny.

== Marriage ceremony ==
Nelson and Frances were married at the Montpelier Estate on the island of Nevis on 11 March 1787. The marriage was performed by the clerk and rector of the church of Saint John Figtree Parish, William Jones. A number of officers from Nelson's ship were present, as was Nelson's cousin, midshipman Maurice Suckling, while the ship's company sent a gift of a silver watch. Prince William Henry gave the bride away, and signed as a witness. Nelson pronounced himself entirely satisfied with his decision, drawing up a new will that made his new wife the sole beneficiary, and writing to his friend William Locker that he was 'morally certain she will continue to make me a happy man for the rest of my days'.

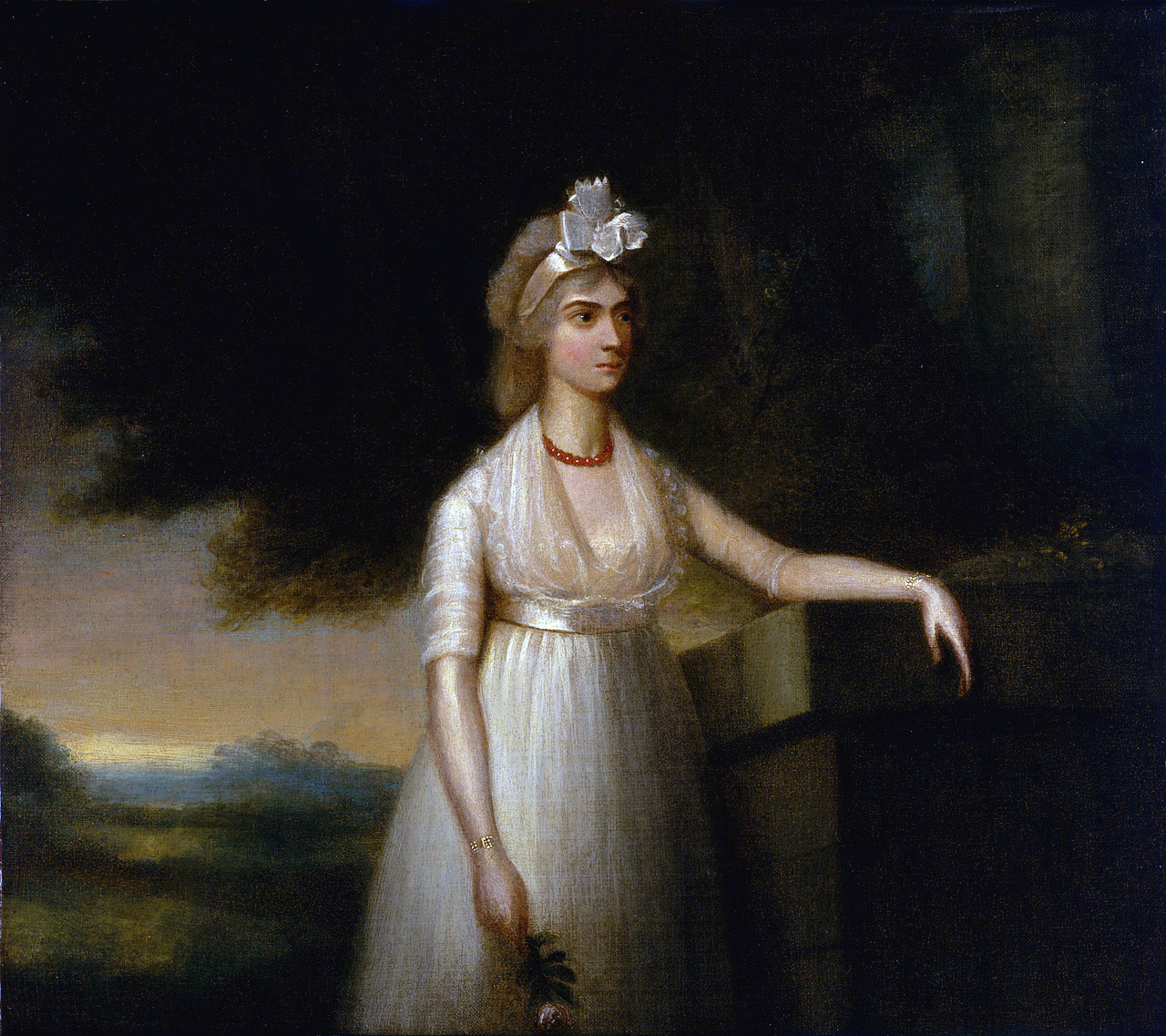
Frances Nelson, 1st Viscountess Nelson, a portrait of the British school, c. 1800

The day after Nelson's marriage to Frances, Nelson's friend and colleague Thomas Pringle wryly remarked that the navy had lost its 'greatest ornament', so expressing his concern that a wife got in the way of a successful naval career. Prince William Henry wrote to Samuel Hood saying 'He is in for it now. I wish him well and happy, and that he may not repent the step he has taken.' Nelson returned to England in July at the completion of his West Indies service, with Frances following later.

== Settling in England ==
The couple initially visited Horatio's relatives in Norfolk, before finally stopping at his old home in Burnham Thorpe to introduce Fanny to his father, the Reverend Edmund Nelson. The elderly Edmund was initially reluctant to meet his new daughter-in-law, but the two quickly became good friends, and Edmund moved out of the parsonage in late 1790 to give the couple space to establish a home. The couple lived happily together at this stage, though Horatio was frustrated by his failure to obtain employment in the navy, and by the discovery that he and Fanny could not conceive a child of their own. The outbreak of war with France in 1793 finally brought Nelson a ship to command, and he took his stepson Josiah Nisbet with him as a midshipman when he commissioned the 64-gun HMS Agamemnon. Fanny stayed at home and cared for Horatio's ageing father, writing letters to her husband and son.

She saw little of her family during the long periods that kept them at sea, and became ever closer with Edmund, taking trips with him to Somerset in the winter. She managed her husband's financial affairs while he was at sea, and kept up relations with the Nelsons in Norfolk. Her husband's achievements were a source of pride, but also worry to her. His actions at the Battle of Cape St Vincent in 1797 made him a popular hero, but terrified Fanny that he might be killed in some heroic act. She wrote him a letter begging him not to repeat such antics, and to leave them to captains, now that he had been promoted to rear-admiral. Instead he went on further expeditions, leading from the front, and lost most of his right arm at the Battle of Santa Cruz de Tenerife later in 1797. Horatio returned to Fanny a broken man, sick and in pain from the stump, and resolved to settle in England with his wife.

== Replaced by Lady Hamilton ==
Fanny helped treat Horatio's wound, and on his recovering and returning to sea in 1798, she returned to the domestic life. The defeat of the French fleet at the Battle of the Nile brought her husband back into public attention. However, he had by now met Emma, Lady Hamilton, the wife of the British ambassador to the Italian Naples, Sir William Hamilton. Fanny and Horatio gradually became estranged as Horatio commenced an extramarital affair with Emma, who came to despise Fanny. In letters to Nelson's relatives, Lady Hamilton referred to Fanny as that 'vile Tom Tit', while Josiah Nisbet was called a 'squinting brat'. Lady Hamilton also declared that Horatio's father Reverend Edmund Nelson had been taken in by 'a very wicked, artful woman', who had conspired to turn him against his son. Meanwhile, Nelson grew increasingly cold and distant toward Fanny, while his trysts with Lady Hamilton became more and more the subject of gossip. As time passed, Nelson began to hate even being in the same room as his wife. Events came to a head around Christmas 1800, when, according to Nelson's solicitor, Fanny issued an ultimatum to her husband. Nelson replied:

I love you sincerely but I cannot forget my obligations to Lady Hamilton or speak of her otherwise than with affection and admiration.

The two never lived together again after this.

Heartbroken, Fanny wrote letters begging her husband to end his relationship with Lady Hamilton and return to her. Nelson, however, returned them unopened. Fanny was taken in by Reverend Edmund Nelson, and she spent most of her time with him in Bath, while her husband's open cohabitation with Lady Hamilton scandalised polite society. Edmund Nelson remained especially horrified by the breakdown of his son's marriage, and wrote to Horatio on occasion to rebuke him, both for adultery and abandonment of his wife.

== Battle of Trafalgar; Death ==
Fanny Nelson fell ill in 1805, the year of her husband's death at Trafalgar, but recovered. From then on she was in indifferent health. She had moved to Paris, France for a time to live with her son, where her eldest grandchild, also named Fanny, recalled her good nature and her devotion to her husband's memory. She would often kiss a miniature of him, once telling the younger Fanny 'When you are older little Fan, you may know what it is to have a broken heart.' Fanny Nelson returned to England and settled at Exmouth, first at The Beacon (commemorated by a blue plaque), and later at Louisa Place.

In 1830, her son Josiah died, and Lady Nelson returned to live in London. She died at Harley Street, London, on 4 May 1831 and was buried beside her son in the churchyard of St Margaret and St Andrew, Littleham, Devon.

== Bibliography ==
- Hibbert, Christopher (1994). Nelson A Personal History. Basic Books. ISBN 978-0-201-40800-3.
- Oman, Carola (1987). Nelson. London: Hodder & Stoughton. ISBN 978-0-340-40672-4.
- Sugden, John (2004). Nelson - A Dream of Glory. London: Jonathan Cape. ISBN 978-0-224-06097-4.
- White, Collin (December 2003). "The Wife's Tale: Frances, Lady Nelson and the break-up of her marriage". Journal for Maritime Research. 5 (1): 121–142. doi:10.1080/21533369.2003.9668331. S2CID 161384767.
