= Budleigh Salterton Railway =

Disused railway line in Devon, England

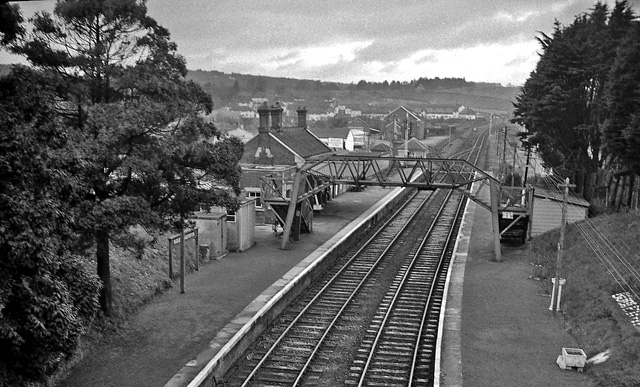
- Budleigh Salterton Station in 1964

Overview
- Locale: Devon, England

History
- Opened: 15 May 1897
- Closed: 27 January 1964 (freight); 6 March 1967 (passengers)

The Budleigh Salterton Railway was a single track branch railway line that ran from a junction on the Sidmouth Railway at Tipton St Johns to Exmouth via four intermediate stations: Newton Poppleford, East Budleigh, Budleigh Salterton, and Littleham. There were passing loops at Littleham and Budleigh Salterton.

== History ==
Sidmouth and Budleigh-Salterton Railway Act 1863
- Act of Parliament
- Parliament of the United Kingdom
- Long title: An Act for incorporating a Company for making a Railway from the Sidmouth Railway, near Tipton, to Budleigh-Salterton; and for other Purposes.
- Citation: 26 & 27 Vict. c. ccxxxiv

Dates
- Royal assent: 28 July 1863

Text of statute as originally enacted

From the beginning of the proposals for the Sidmouth Railway, promoters in the town of Budleigh Salterton had been putting forward schemes for an extension to their town from Tipton or from Sidmouth itself, and also from Exmouth. Exmouth had gained its own railway, the Exmouth Branch railway, direct from Exeter in 1861. One such scheme was put forward to extend from a junction at Tipton to Budleigh Salterton and through to Exmouth, getting an act of Parliament, the Sidmouth and Budleigh-Salterton Railway Act 1863 (26 & 27 Vict. c. ccxxxiv), although Sidmouth itself had not got a railway at that date. The scheme came to nothing, and a number of abortive schemes followed. In one case in 1893 the Exmouth Dock Company opposed the bill on the basis that they derived £500 annual income from the conveyance of goods (by coastal shipping) from Exmouth to Budleigh Salterton.

Budleigh Salterton Railway Act 1894
- Act of Parliament
- Parliament of the United Kingdom
- Long title: An Act for incorporating the Budleigh Salterton Railway Company and for other purposes.
- Citation: 57 & 58 Vict. c. c

Dates
- Royal assent: 20 July 1894

Text of statute as originally enacted

Finally the Budleigh Salterton Railway was incorporated by the Budleigh Salterton Railway Act 1894 (57 & 58 Vict. c. c) on 20 July 1894, with powers to build a line from Tipton (later Tipton St Johns) on the Sidmouth Railway to Budleigh. The connection at Tipton gave access to the L&SWR's London to Exeter main line at Sidmouth Junction, and no direct connection towards Exmouth was included in the proposals, perhaps in response to the Exmouth Dock Company's opposition.

The London and South Western Railway (L&SWR) was to operate the line, taking 60% of receipts (plus certain minor fixed costs). The contractors Lucas and Aird proceeded with the construction, and notwithstanding the loss of two temporary bridges when the River Otter was in flood during 1896, construction was completed early.

Major F. Marindin of the Railway Inspectorate passed the line for opening when he visited on 10 April 1897.

The line was constructed to full main line standards with 82 lb/yd steel rails and creosoted softwood sleepers. Signalling was only provided at Salterton, the terminus, and by the Sidmouth Railway company at the junction at Tipton.

The line accordingly opened on 15 May 1897, with stations at Budleigh and Salterton. There were eight passenger trains each way, one of them mixed, and one goods train.

Budleigh was renamed East Budleigh, and Salterton was renamed Budleigh Salterton on 27 April 1898. Newton Poppleford station opened on 1 June 1899.

=== Closure ===
Major reduction in the services along the line in the 1960s led to a corresponding decrease in usage. The line closed to freight traffic on 27 January 1964 and to passengers on 6 March 1967.
