= Sidmouth Railway =

Disused railway line in Devon, England

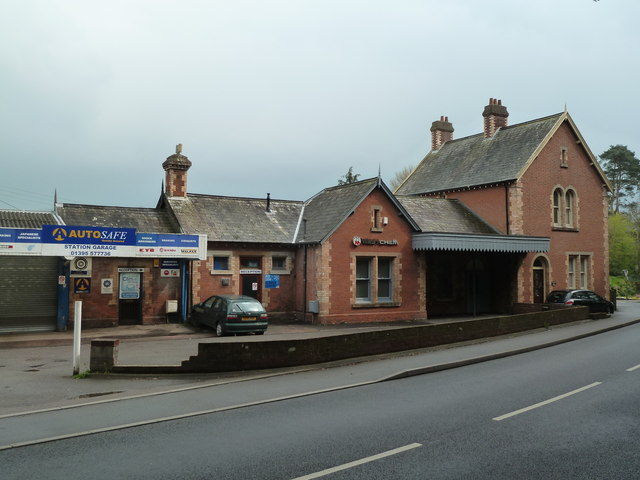
- Former railway station in Sidmouth

Overview
- Status: Disused
- Locale: Devon, England
- Termini: Sidmouth Junction; Ottery Road Station (Feniton)

Service
- Type: Light rail
- Operator: London and South Western Railway

History
- Opened: 6 July 1874
- Closed: 6 March 1967 (passenger); 8 May 1967 (freight)

The Sidmouth Railway was a railway branch line that ran from a junction at Feniton to Sidmouth, connecting the resort to the main line network.

== History ==
The London and South Western Railway (L&SWR) opened a main line from Yeovil to Exeter on 18 July 1860, giving a through route from London. The rugged terrain of the south-east Devon coastline meant that the railway passed some distance to the north of Sidmouth; the nearest station was Feniton, nine miles away. There had been a number of railway schemes put forward over the previous decade or so to serve Sidmouth directly but they had come to nothing.

=== Planning ===
==== Sidmouth Railway and Harbour ====
Sidmouth Railway and Harbour Act 1862
- Act of Parliament
- Parliament of the United Kingdom
- Long title: An Act for making a Railway and Harbour in the County of Devon, to be called the Sidmouth Railway and Harbour, and for other Purposes.
- Citation: 25 & 26 Vict. c. ccxxxvii
- Territorial extent: United Kingdom

Dates
- Royal assent: 7 August 1862
- Commencement: 7 August 1862 (Note: The Acts of Parliament (Commencement) Act 1793.)
- Repealed: 31 January 2013
Other legislation
Repealed by	Statute Law (Repeals) Act 2013

Status: Repealed

Sidmouth Railway and Harbour Act 1867 (Note: Section 1.)
- Act of Parliament
- Parliament of the United Kingdom
- Long title: An Act to enable the Sidmouth Railway and Harbour Company to make certain Deviations in their authorized Line; and for other Purposes.
- Citation: 30 & 31 Vict. c. cv
- Territorial extent: United Kingdom

Dates
- Royal assent: 20 June 1867
- Commencement: 20 June 1867
Other legislation
Repealed by	Statute Law (Repeals) Act 2013

Status: Repealed

Text of statute as originally enacted

On 18 December 1861, London promoters held a meeting for the purpose of forming a company to build a railway branch line to Sidmouth and a harbour there. The "Sidmouth Railway and Harbour Company" obtained an act of Parliament, the Sidmouth Railway and Harbour Act 1862 (25 & 26 Vict. c. ccxxxvii), on 7 August 1862 with a share capital of £120,000 and authorised loan capital of £40,000. Subscriptions were slow to be taken up, and the contractor Shrimpton complained that he was unable to make progress, as the engineer, H. H. Bird, had not supplied adequate plans. Further difficulties arose when it emerged that the company had secretly divided the share issue into two classes, and calls were only being made to one of the classes. Finally it was shown that the company had unsupported liabilities of £20,000, over three-quarters of which were due to the contractor Shrimpton.

Undertakings were given to resolve the matter, but the company foundered in 1869.

==== Sidmouth Railway ====
Sidmouth Railway Act 1871
- Act of Parliament
- Parliament of the United Kingdom
- Long title: An Act to authorise the construction of a Railway in Devonshire, to be called "The Sidmouth Railway;" and for other purposes.
- Citation: 34 & 35 Vict. c. lxviii
- Territorial extent: United Kingdom

Dates
- Royal assent: 29 June 1871
- Commencement: 29 June 1871

Status: Current legislation

Text of statute as originally enacted

The trustees of the Balfour family now launched a scheme for a Sidmouth Railway, and this got its act of Parliament, the Sidmouth Railway Act 1871 (34 & 35 Vict. c. lxviii), on 29 June 1871, with share capital of £66,000 and borrowing powers of £22,000. The line was to be constructed under the arrangements for a light railway, and an agreement was made with the L&SWR for 50% of receipts if over £4,000, with an option for the L&SWR to purchase the railway.

The share issue was successful and a tender for construction of the line was awarded to R. T. Relf of Okehampton for £35,000. Possibly learning from the delays encountered in constructing the neighbouring Seaton Branch Line, there was a penalty clause for late completion of the work. Nonetheless, Relf got into difficulties, asking the company for extra payment as he found that he had under-priced the station work, designs for which had not been completed at the time of tendering. The directors made a small allowance to him, and he sued for the balance, but he lost his case. However the railway was complete by July 1874. Col. F. H. Rich of the Railway Inspectorate of the Board of Trade duly made the inspection and passed the line for opening. It opened on Monday 6 July 1874.

=== Early operation ===
On the opening day there was no formal ceremony to mark the event, although celebrations took place through the first week.

The branch was single track. The junction station on the main line at Feniton had been called Ottery Road (Note: The station had had several different names since opening.) immediately prior to the opening, but the name was changed to Sidmouth Junction on the day of opening of the branch line. Sidmouth trains used a bay platform on the down (south) side of the station, and they left the bay in an eastwards direction. On leaving the station, the line curved round to the south falling at 1 in 110 and then 1 in 53, followed by flattish gradients to Ottery St Mary, 2 miles 78 chains from Sidmouth Junction; there was a crossing loop. Just before the next station the line crossed the river Otter on a 55-yard viaduct, then entering Tipton, at 5 miles 8 chains, also equipped with a crossing loop. The name was changed to Tipton St John on 1 February 1881.

Leaving Tipton the line now climbed at 1 in 45 for two miles to Bowd Summit, then falling at 1 in 54 for a mile to Sidmouth station, at 8 miles 23 chains. The station was some considerable distance from the sea front.

When the line opened, the passenger train service comprised seven trains each way six days a week, taking 28 to 30 minutes for the journey. After the opening of the Budleigh Salterton Railway the train frequency on the northern half of the original Sidmouth railway naturally increased. By 1909 the service had approximately doubled, with trains on Sundays also. Sidmouth was not an industrial town, so goods services mainly brought inwards agricultural supplies, building materials and coal for domestic purposes and for the gasworks at Sidmouth.

The branch was worked by staff and ticket at first, with Tyers electric train tablet system being introduced in 1904. The very steep gradients meant that special precautions had to be imposed for the operation of goods trains over the line.

Locomotive power initially was restricted to those suitable for use on light railways, and this is thought to include Beattie 2-4-0 well tanks. In later years the M7 0-4-4T class came to dominate. When the West Country light pacific 21C110 was to receive its name Sidmouth at a naming ceremony, it visited Sidmouth for the purpose on 27 June 1946, but the class was normally banned until after 1951.

Tipton was renamed Tipton St John's on 1 February 1881.

=== Attempted takeover ===
In 1894 the L&SWR, which was operating the line, offered to purchase it outright for £70,050 but this was refused by the company. However, in 1922, just before the Grouping of the railways in Great Britain, a share swap was arranged, effectively ending the independent existence of the Sidmouth Railway company.

=== Later operation ===
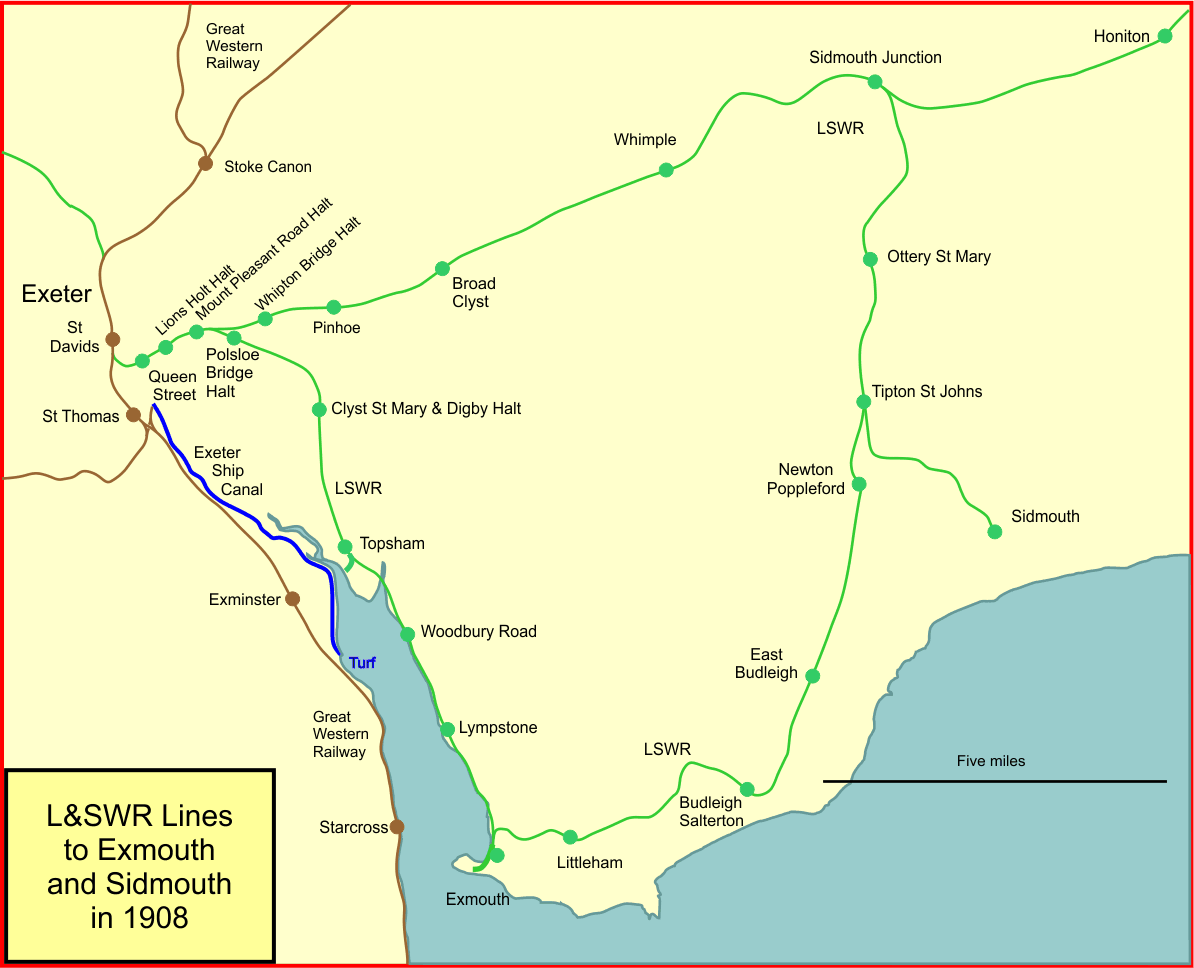
Exmouth and Sidmouth branches in 1908

From the opening of the Exmouth and Salterton section, the L&SWR was now operating the small network served from Sidmouth Junction: to Sidmouth and to Exmouth, forking at Tipton. The L&SWR later purchased the Budleigh Salterton line, and this became effective on 1 January 1911.

The section from Sidmouth Junction to Sidmouth has been described above; from Tipton St John's towards Exmouth the line fell at 1 in 50—the contrary gradients viewed from Tipton platform looking south were startling—then easing to 1 in 360 and then level beyond Newton Poppleford, falling again at 1 in 100 for a while. Moderate gradients followed as far as East Budleigh (originally plain Budleigh) after which the line climbed at 1 in 50 for 1½ miles, then after Knowle cutting falling again at 1 in 50 until the Salterton Road overbridge approaching Exmouth.

From 1914 a number of Waterloo to Exmouth express trains were routed via Tipton. The lines became very busy in the first decades of the twentieth century, with ten trains each way per day on the Budleigh Salterton line. Matters were especially busy at Tipton St John's where Waterloo trains divided and joined (for Sidmouth and Exmouth respectively), with as many as 50 train movements per day.

From 1927 there was a service from Nottingham via the Somerset and Dorset line and Templecombe.

In the summer of 1938 there were eleven trains each way daily between Sidmouth and Sidmouth Junction and five each way between Sidmouth and Tipton St Johns; and five trains between Tipton St Johns and Exmouth, three of which originated from or ran to Sidmouth, and the other two to or from Sidmouth Junction. Three trains each way ran through to or from Exeter. There were three trains with through coaches from or to Waterloo (four more on Saturdays, with a Derby train as well).

Through coaches were discontinued in 1964 except on summer Saturdays, as the local trains were diesel multiple units.

The lines closed to passenger traffic on 6 March 1967 and to freight on 8 May that year.

In January 2019, Campaign for Better Transport released a report identifying the line was listed as Priority 2 for reopening. Priority 2 is for those lines which require further development or a change in circumstances (such as housing developments).
