= LYM =

LYM or Lym may refer to:

- Lanyang Museum, a museum in Taiwan
- Lebanese Youth Movement, a far-right militia in the Lebanese Civil War
- Local Yokel Media, online marketplace in Connecticut, United States
- Lubell–Yamamoto–Meshalkin inequality, in combinatorial mathematics
- River Lym, south-west England
- Worldwide LaRouche Youth Movement, part of America's LaRouche political organization

== Transport codes ==
- Key Lime Air, airline based in Denver, United States (ICAO code)
- Lympne Airport, airport in Kent, England (IATA code)
- Lympstone Village railway station, Devon, England (National Rail station code)

== See also ==
- Lim (disambiguation)
- Lymm, Cheshire, England, a village
