= Lim =

Lim or LIM may refer to:

== Name ==
- Lim (Korean surname), a common Korean surname
- Lim (Chinese surname), Hokkien, Hakka, Teochew and Hainanese spelling of the Chinese family name "Lin"
- Poon Lim (1918–1991), formerly missing person at sea
- Adrian Lim (1942-1988), Singaporean rapist
- Lim Kimya (1951/1952–2025), Cambodian and French politician
- Liza Lim (born 1966), Australian classical composer
- Christina Lim, Australian electrical engineer

== Abbreviations ==
- Lanes in metres, a unit of measure for vehicle ferries
- LIM College (Laboratory Institute of Merchandising), New York City, US
- Linear induction motor
- Logical Information Machines, Chicago, US software company
- LIM domain, a protein-protein interaction domain
- Lotus-Intel-Microsoft, the alliance responsible for the Expanded Memory Specification (EMS)
- Line Insulation Monitor, also known as Insulation monitoring device

== Places ==
- Jorge Chávez International Airport (IATA airport code LIM), Lima, Peru
- Lim (Croatia), a bay and a valley
- Lim (river), in Montenegro, Albania, Bosnia and Herzegovina and Serbia
- River Lim, Dorset, England
- Lim Island or Adır Island, Lake Van, Turkey
- Lim, Bắc Ninh, a township in Vietnam

== Others ==
- A symbol for the limit (mathematics) operator
- Lim (musical instrument), a Bhutanese flute
- Lim dynasty, Bronze Age Amorite dynasty

== See also ==
- Lymm, a village in Cheshire, England
- Lympne (pronounced 'Lim'), a village in Kent, England
