= Fire Beacon Hill =

Local Nature Reserve in East Devon, England

Coordinates: 50.701°N 3.330°W

Fire Beacon Hill is a Local Nature Reserve in East Devon, England. It is registered as Common land and known as Harpford Common. Sidmouth Town Council are the current owners, and are responsible for the management of the site.

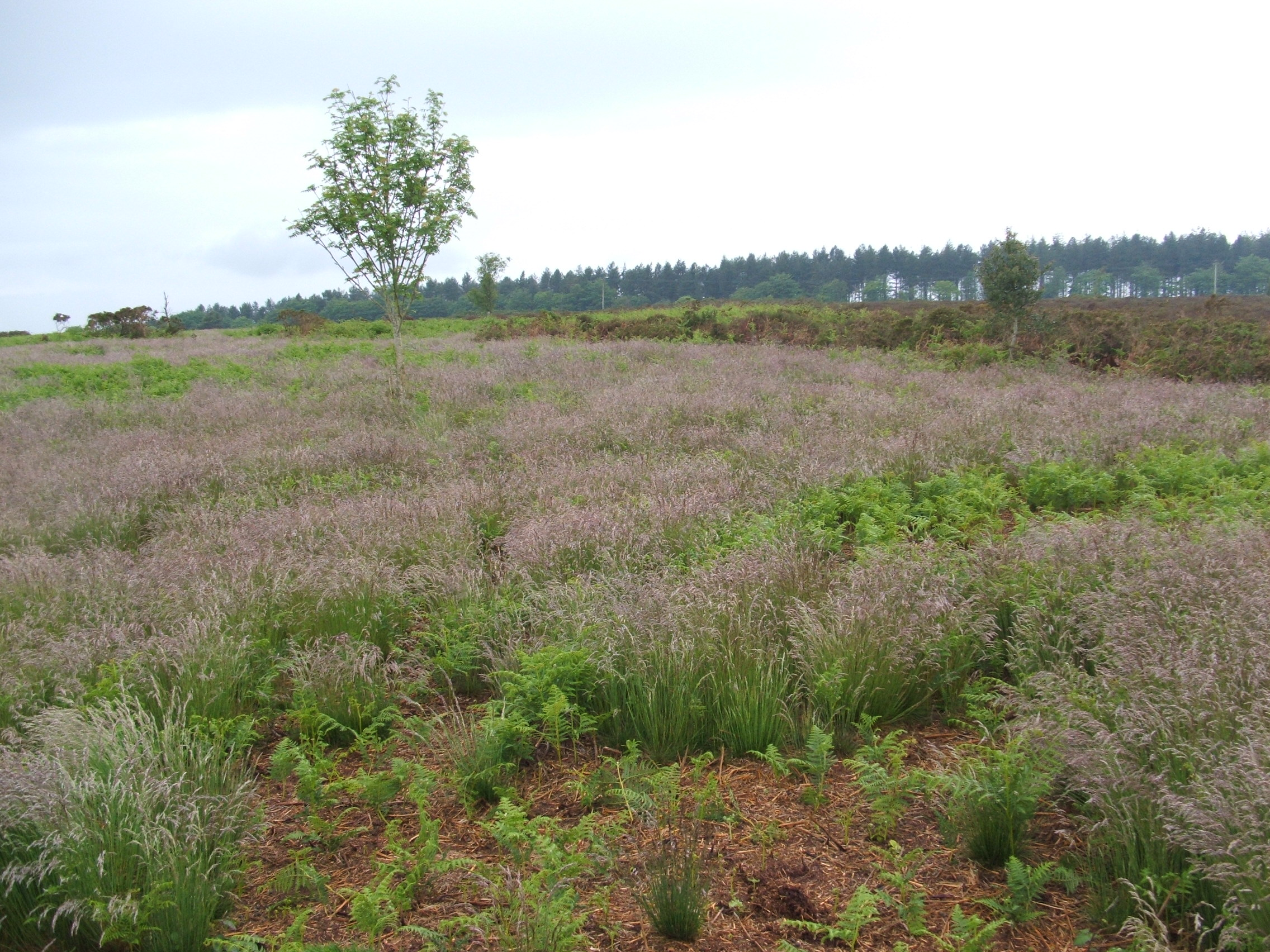
Purple moor grass at the top of the hill with heather and gorse to the right

== Geology ==
The site is part of the East Devon dissected plateau, composed of calcareous upper greensand capped by clay, Flints and chert, and overlying Keuper marls.

The north part of the site is 225 metres above sea level and the ground slopes steeply to the south down to 150 metres.

== Ecological features ==
The site contains

- Lowland heath a rare biodiversity action plan habitat
- Wet woodland also a rare BAP habitat
- Ling Calluna vulgaris - the most common species of heather. 4 Corolla (flower petals) and Calyx unlike Erica which are bell shaped
- Bell heather Erica cinerea - leaves in whorls of 3
- Cross leaved heath Erica tetralix - leaves in whorls of 4
- European gorse
- Western gorse Ulex gallii - Lower growing and more spreading than European Gorse
- Bristle bent Agrostis curtisii - fine leaves, grows in tufts
- Purple moor grass Molinia caerulea - a BAP habitat species
- Bracken Pteridium aquilinum - threatens to dominate the areas where it is found
- Common bluebell
- Sheep sorrell Rumex acetosella
- Bramble Rubus fruticosus
- Foxglove Digitalis purpurea
- Some recolonising by heath bedstraw Galium saxatile, bilberry Vaccinium myrtillus, tormentil Pontentilla erecta, and heath milkwort Polygala serpyllifolia
- Alder, beech, birch, holly Ilex aquifolium, hazel Corylus avellana, oak Quercus robur, willow
- Grayling (butterfly)
- Yellowhammer
- Dartford warbler - as a Mediterranean bird, it can be found in the heather and gorse as these offer relatively warm microclimates for them.
- European stonechat - can be found on the tops of bushes.
- Common raven
- Linnet - favours low down thorny bushes and scrub, with good supply of small-sized seed
- Eurasian bullfinch-nests in tall hedges more than 4 metres high and wide, and prefers fruit seed
- European nightjar - nests on the ground and is well camouflaged. Waving a white handkerchief is said to attract them.
- Common buzzard
- Adder Vipera berus- mates mid-May and gives birth between July and October
- Common lizard Lacerta vivipara
- Fox Vulpes vulpes, badger Meles meles, roe deer Capreolus capreolus
- Deer grass Muhlenbergia rigens

== Historical ==
- Fire Beacon Hill was the site of one of the beacons set up to warn Elizabethan London of the approaching Spanish Armada
- It was part of open heathland that once stretched from Honiton to Sidmouth. The rest of the land was taken for conifer plantations. The site is now seen by environmental organisations as a potential seed bank and species reservoir for future heathland restoration and re-creation projects.
- An apple tree can be found on the southern side. Fruit trees were used as landmarks as far back as Saxon times.
- Fire Beacon Hill was described in the Journals of the Reverend John Swete, who travelled through it on horseback in 1795. He describes for example a hedgerow of beech, which is now a remnant in the form of a few trees.
- In June 1993 a balloon crashed into a power line above the site. The resulting intense fire sterilised the soil.

== Public recreation and access ==
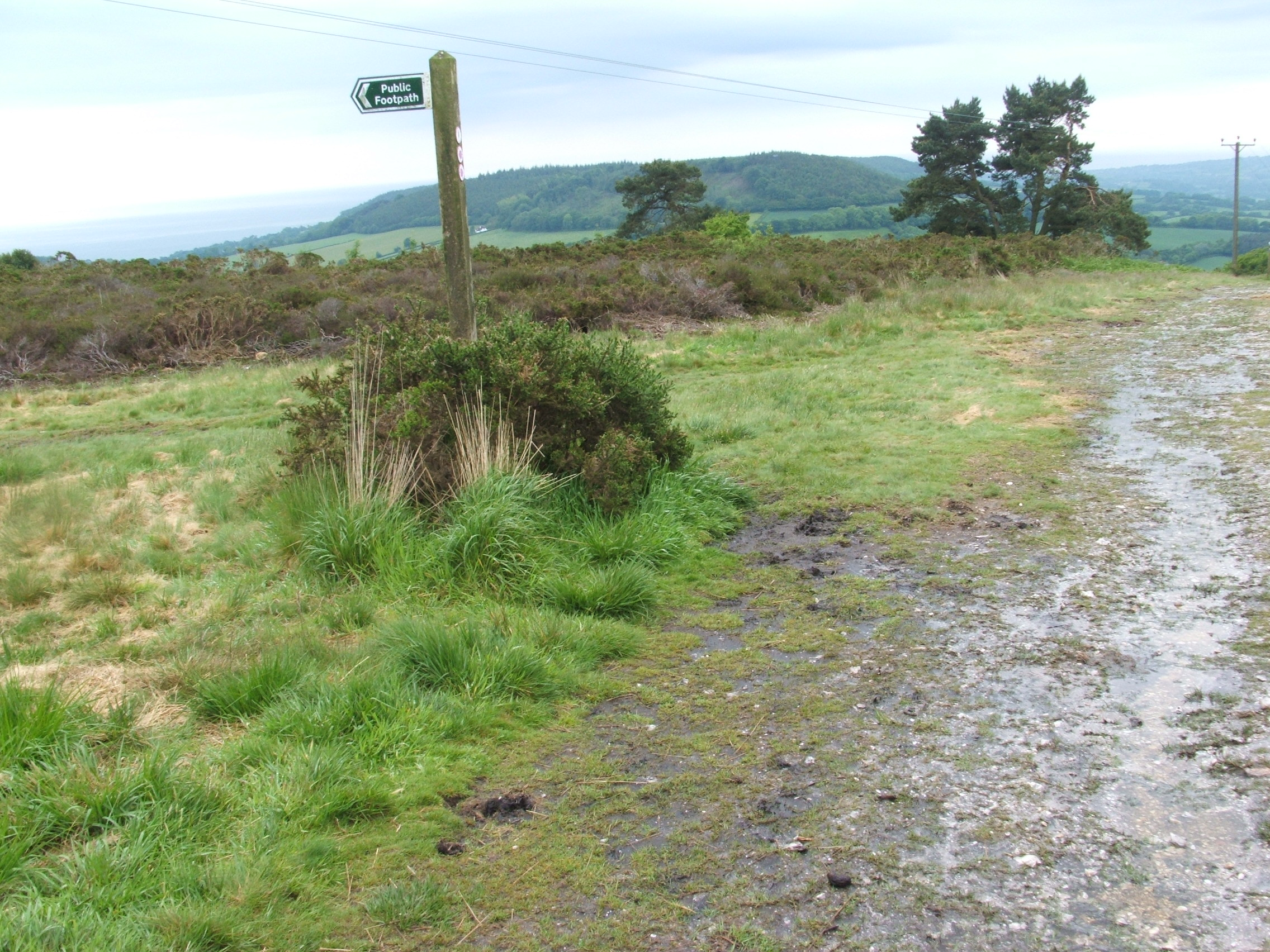
East Devon way and footpath running through the site

The site is open to the public and is used for recreation and education. Being on top of a hill near the Jurassic coast (one of the World Heritage Sites), the fine views give the site a high aesthetic appeal.

The East Devon Way footpath runs from north to south across the site.
