= Lowland heath =

Lowland heath is a Biodiversity Action Plan habitat as it is a type of ancient wild landscape. Natural England's Environmental Stewardship scheme describes lowland heath as containing dry heath, wet heath and valley mire communities, usually below 250 metres (820 ft) in altitude, on acidic soils and shallow peat, typically comprising heathers, gorses, fine grasses, wild flowers and lichens in a complex mosaic. Heathers and other dwarf shrubs usually account for at least 25% of the ground cover. By contrast, upland heath, which is above 300 metres (980 ft) in altitude, is called moorland, Dartmoor being an example.

== Characteristics ==
Lowland heath occurs on a range of acidic pH < 5, impoverished soils that are often sandy and free draining, characteristically podsols. There are no deep-burrowing earthworms so soil profile boundaries are sharp. There is often a thick litter layer on top of slow-decaying leaf litter. The habitat is susceptible to drought in summer due to its freely draining nature. As many of the plants are waxy, fire is a hazard. A plant-animal association has adapted to these harsh conditions.

There are three types of lowland heath according to their location and climate conditions: wet (impervious rocks/clay preventing water drainage), dry (well-drained), and humid (between the two types). Wet heaths contain more different species than dry, such as sphagnum mosses and carnivorous plants (Drosera, Pinguicula).

== Development ==
Some 80% of lowland heath has been lost since 1800, with the UK holding a fifth of the world's remaining stock. Pollen grain carbon dating has indicated that it has existed in the UK for 14,000 years as the ice-caps retreated. As the weather warmed, trees became established and replaced the tundra heath.

But 5000 years ago, humans began to clear forests, and heathland re-established on acid, sandy soils. Its area is thought to have peaked around the 16th century. From then onwards agricultural and transport technology improved, allowing nutrients to be put back into the soil, non-heathland type crops to grow, or the heath was simply no longer managed as in the past.

Heathland succession moves from grasses and bracken to gorses and heather, and finally to woodland (birch, pine and oaks).

Heaths are man-made. Heathland was originally wooded with rich soil. As the woods were removed, the soils eroded and leached; especially nitrogen easily leaches away.

== Indicators ==
- Heathers – (Ling) (Calluna vulgaris) is dominant on moorland; the flowers are pale purple, the plant branches extensively, the leaves are in opposite pairs (not whorls); and are oily in order to prevent water loss. Their mycorrhizal fungus, Hymenoscyphus ericae, is unusual in being able to degrade soil humic materials, giving the plant access to immobilised nutrients. Bell heather, Erica cinerea, flowers in mid-July, and is crimson-purple; its leaves are dark green in whorls of three leaves. Cross-leaved heath, Erica tetralix, can be found in wetter patches. It has rose-pink flowers with a nodding, drooping head at the end of the shoot, less dense than bell heather. The leaves are arranged as a cross of four, are greyish with hairs, and are curled downward – the hairs trap moisture. The plants shut down in summer and grow more in winter. Heathers have a six-year pioneer phase, which is the time they take to form a bush. The bush grows until it is about 25 years old, when the centre starts to have gaps due to less vigorous growth. Mosses/bryophytes start to colonise this area due to the humid conditions. The plant begins to degenerate after 30 years.
- Gorse – Ulex europeaus flowers throughout the year but peaks in the spring. Western gorse (Ulex gallii) is smaller and flowers mid-July to mid-August on the more exposed areas. Dwarf gorse or furze (Ulex minor) flowering in late summer, is found locally on Dorset and Sussex lowland heaths. Gorses are part of the pea family and have nitrogen-fixing ability due to their symbiotic association with bacteria.
- Bracken – Pteridium aquilium is a fern, but is a serious weed due to its deep tough rhizomes. It was formerly cut and used as bedding. Sometimes it was burnt for ash lime.
- Grasses – Purple moor grass Molinia caerulea is found in wet locations and is edible when young; fescues Festuca spp and bristle bent are found in dry locations.
- No mammals
- Many insects.

Typical animal species found in lowland heath are:

- Snakes and reptiles. In the UK the smooth snake is only found on heaths in Dorset. The sand lizard is a heath species as well, but is also found on sand dunes.
- Birds – Dartford warbler, European stonechat, European nightjar, Eurasian hobby (feeds on insects and birds), tree pipit, and Eurasian wren.

== Structure ==
An ideal heathland includes vegetation of various heights and structures, scattered trees and scrub, some bare ground, wet heaths, ponds, water and bogs.

The cover of dwarf shrubs should be between 25% and 95% with at least two frequent species. There must be a range of age classes of heather present, with cover of young heather between 10 and 15%, cover of old heather between 10 and 30%, cover of undesirable species (bracken, injurious weeds, invasive nonnative plants) must be less than 10%; and the cover of trees/scrub must be less than 15%.

== Threats ==
Threats to heathland include changes in farmland; afforestation; fire; lack of management (overgrowth), for example scrub and bracken encroachment; housing development; quarrying; nutrient enrichment (often dog faeces); pine and silver birch, which readily establish and shade the surrounding vegetation; ploughing; and predatory cats (urban heathland sites).

== Management ==
Options include cutting trees (such as for firewood), using grazing animals to control vegetation and regrowth, controlling scrub, making sure there is an age range, and trying to incorporate the requirement of individual species.

There is a UK Biodiversity Action Plan with a target of restoring 58,000 hectares (140,000 acres) of lowland heathland and recreating a further 6,000 hectares (15,000 acres). In addition, grants are available in England under Natural England's Environmental Stewardship scheme.

== UK lowland heath ==
Lowland Heath can be found in the UK in Devon, Hampshire, Dorset (mainly found here), Sussex (some), Kent (some), Surrey (some), Lincolnshire (some), County Durham (some), Cornwall, Norfolk, Nottinghamshire, Merseyside, Cheshire and Suffolk.

East Devon locations are Gittisham Common, Woodbury Common, Mutter's Moor, Aylesbeare Common, Pebblebed Heaths, Trinity Hill, Venn Ottery Common, Bystock Pools, Fire Beacon Hill, Hartridge Common, Offwell Heath, Hense Moor.

Staffordshire has areas of lowland heath at Cannock Chase and Wetley Moor, both of which are Sites of Special Scientific Interest.

Areas of lowland heath within Greater London survive across several commons and open spaces, including Wimbledon Common, Hampstead Heath, Richmond Park and parts of Mitcham Common. At Mitcham Common, areas of lowland heath and acid grassland occur within a mosaic of habitats, particularly within the golf course. In 2007, conservation work at the Mill House area aimed to restore sections of lowland heath. Mitcham Common is designated a Site of Metropolitan Importance for Nature Conservation.
