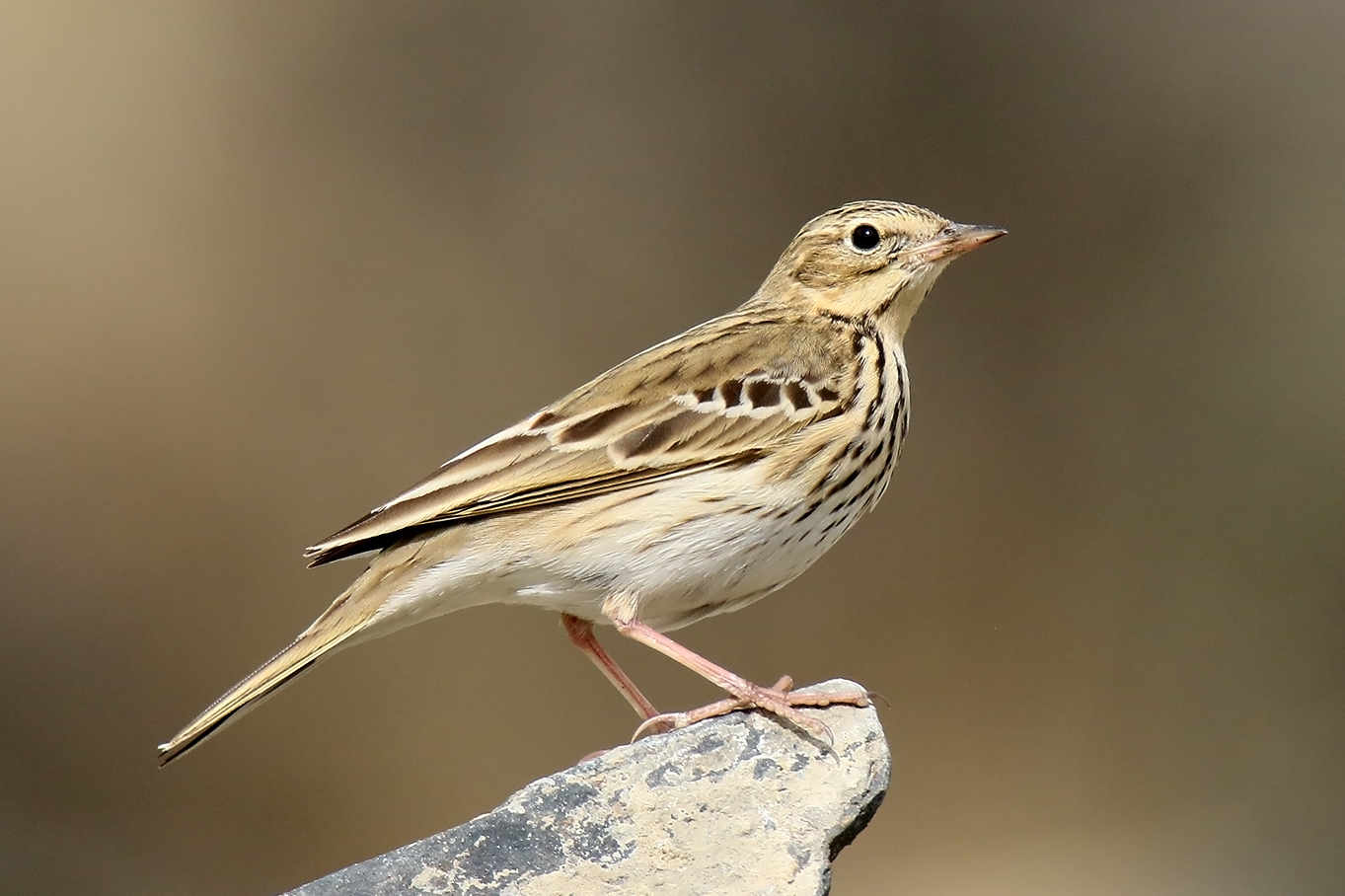
- in Gilgit-Baltistan, Pakistan

Conservation status
- Least Concern (IUCN 3.1)

Scientific classification
- Kingdom: Animalia
- Phylum: Chordata
- Class: Aves
- Order: Passeriformes
- Family: Motacillidae
- Genus: Anthus
- Species: A. trivialis

Binomial name
- Anthus trivialis (Linnaeus, 1758)
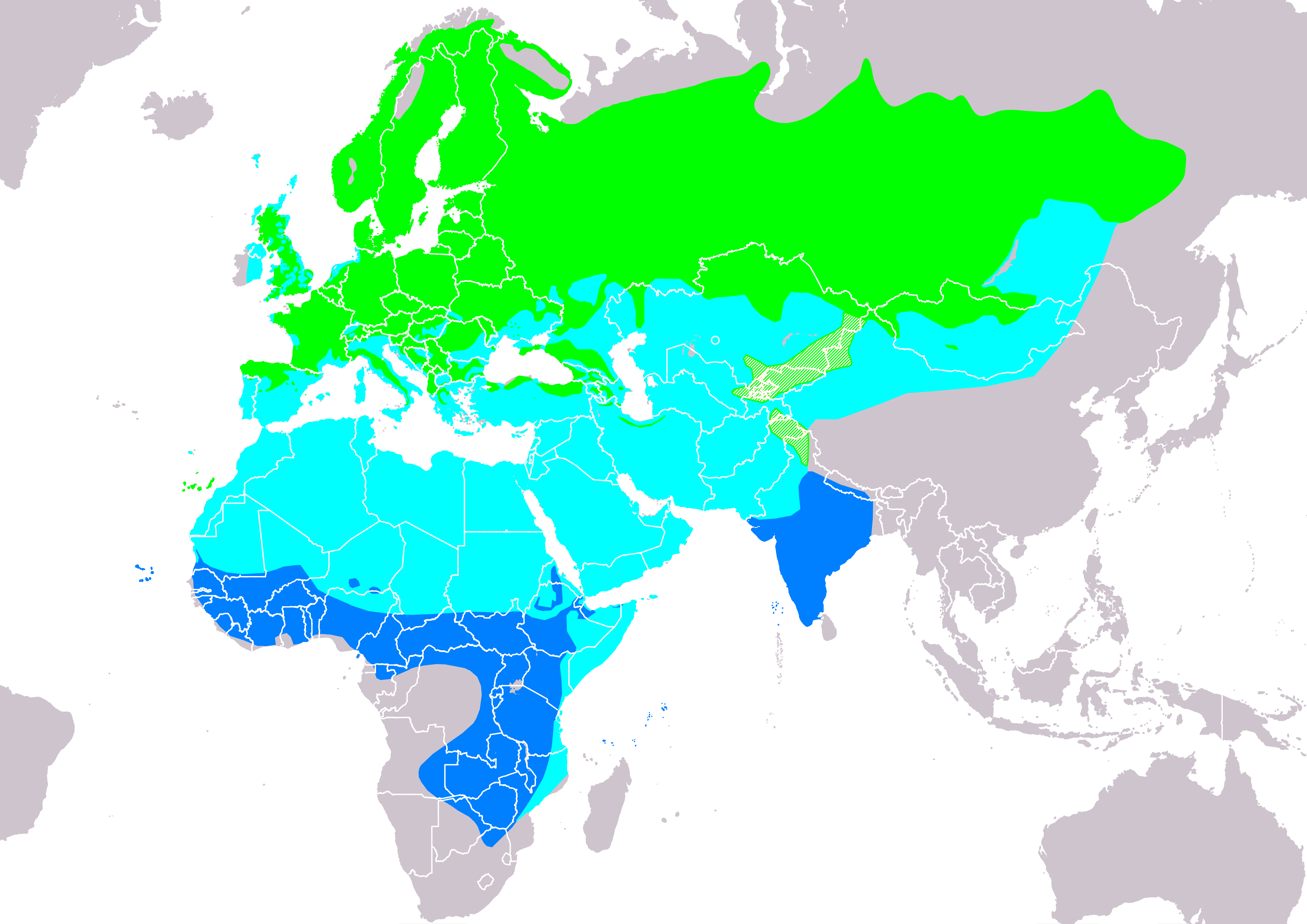
- Range of A. trivialis Breeding Non-breeding Passage

Synonyms
- Alauda trivialis Linnaeus, 1758

Audio
- Song, recorded Devon, England

= Tree pipit =

Species of bird

The tree pipit (Anthus trivialis) is a small passerine bird that breeds throughout most of Europe and the Palearctic as far east as the East Siberian Mountains. It is a long-distance migrant, migrating in winter to Africa and southern Asia. The scientific name is from Latin: anthus is the name of a small bird of grasslands, and the specific trivialis means "common".

The breeding habitat is open woodland and scrub. The nest is placed on the ground and usually 4–6 eggs are laid. This species is insectivorous like its relatives, but will also eat seeds.

== Taxonomy ==
The tree pipit was formally described by the Swedish naturalist Carl Linnaeus in 1758 in the tenth edition of his Systema Naturae under the binomial name Alauda trivialis. Linnaeus noted that the species occurred in Sweden. The specific epithet trivialis is Latin meaning "common" or "ordinary" from Latin trivium meaning "public street". The tree pipit is now placed in the genus Anthus that was introduced in 1805 by the German naturalist Johann Matthäus Bechstein.

Two subspecies are recognised:

- A. t. trivialis (Linnaeus, 1758) – breeds across Europe to southwest Siberia, north Iran and Turkey, east Kazakhstan, southcentral Siberia, Mongolia and northwest China; winters in India and Africa. Includes proposed subspecies sibiricus.
- A. t. haringtoni Witherby, 1917 – breeds in northwest Himalayas; winters in central India

== Description ==
This is a small pipit that resembles the meadow pipit. It is an undistinguished looking species, with brown stripes above and with black markings on white underparts and buff breast below. It can be differentiated from the slightly smaller meadow pipit by its heavier bill and greater contrast between its buff breast and white belly. Tree pipits are more likely to perch in trees.

The call is a strong spek, unlike the weak call of its relative. The song flight is unmistakable. The bird rises a short distance up from a tree, and then parachutes down on stiff wings, the song becoming more drawn out towards the end.

== Life cycle ==
- mid-September to mid-April: lives in sub Saharan Africa
- mid April to beginning of May: migrates and arrives in countries such as the United Kingdom
- beginning of May to August: breeding season, two broods
- August to mid September: flies back to Saharan Africas

== Distribution and habitat ==
The tree pipit breeds in habitats with a wooded component, including lowland heath and coppice. It is most common in open woodland bordering on moorland or in open structured oak woodland – hence the need for heavy thinning to create a gappy structure. It prefers medium-sized trees with a low canopy, where there is low-growing scrub and brambles less than 2 metres high, so that horizontal visibility is relatively good. It likes a mosaic of grass and bracken, but not heavily grazed short turf, so light to moderate grazing is preferred.

== Behaviour ==
=== Breeding ===
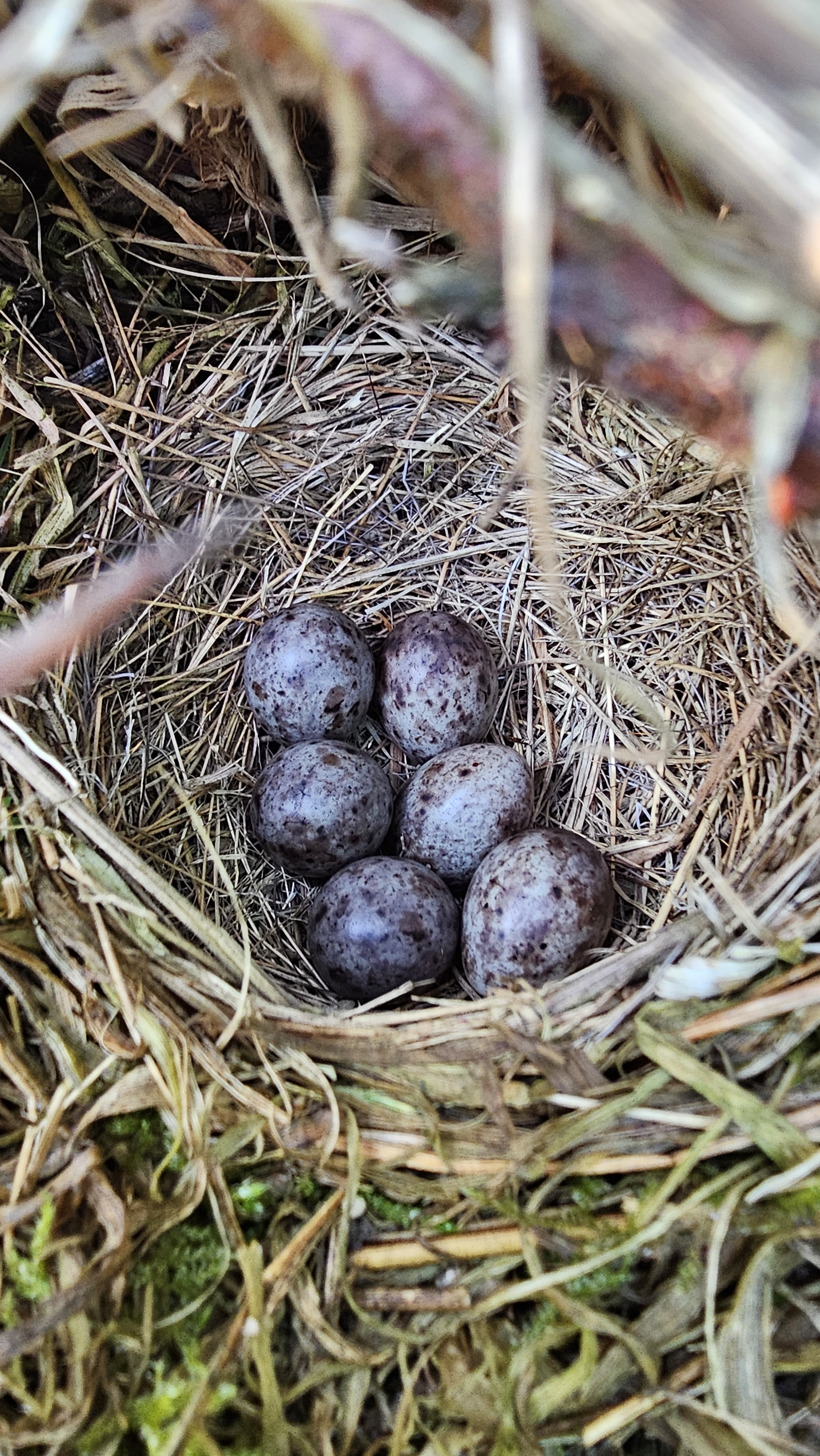
A tree pipit nest found in clearfell habitat, Northern England, holding a clutch of six eggs of the darker variation.

Tree pipits nest on the ground amongst grass or heather tussocks. The nest is built by the female. The clutch of 4 to 6 eggs is incubated by the female. The eggs hatch after 12–14 days. The chicks are fed by both parents and leave the nest after 12–14 days. The nests are sometimes parasitized by the common cuckoo (Cuculus canorus).

=== Feeding ===
Tree pipits mainly eat invertebrates, typically insects, but will also eat some plant material. They mostly forage on the ground.

== Gallery ==
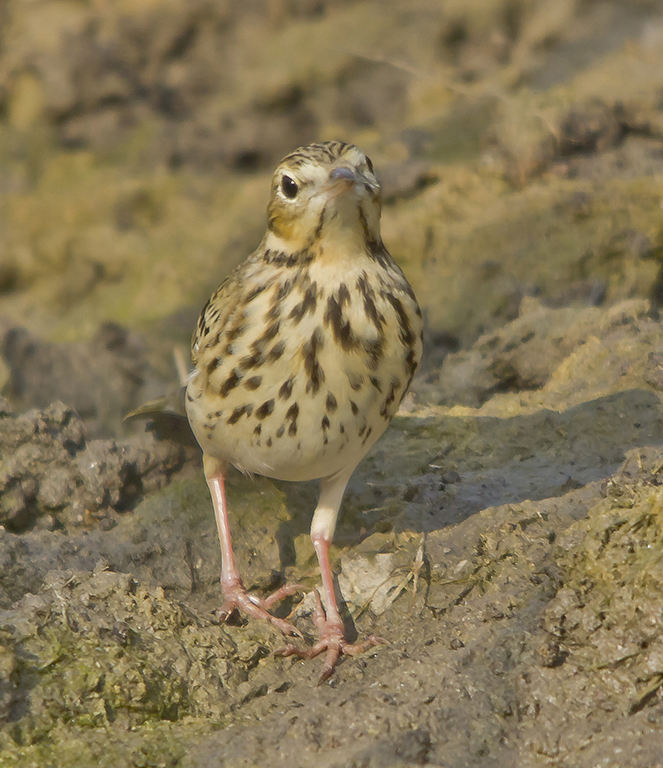
At Rajkot

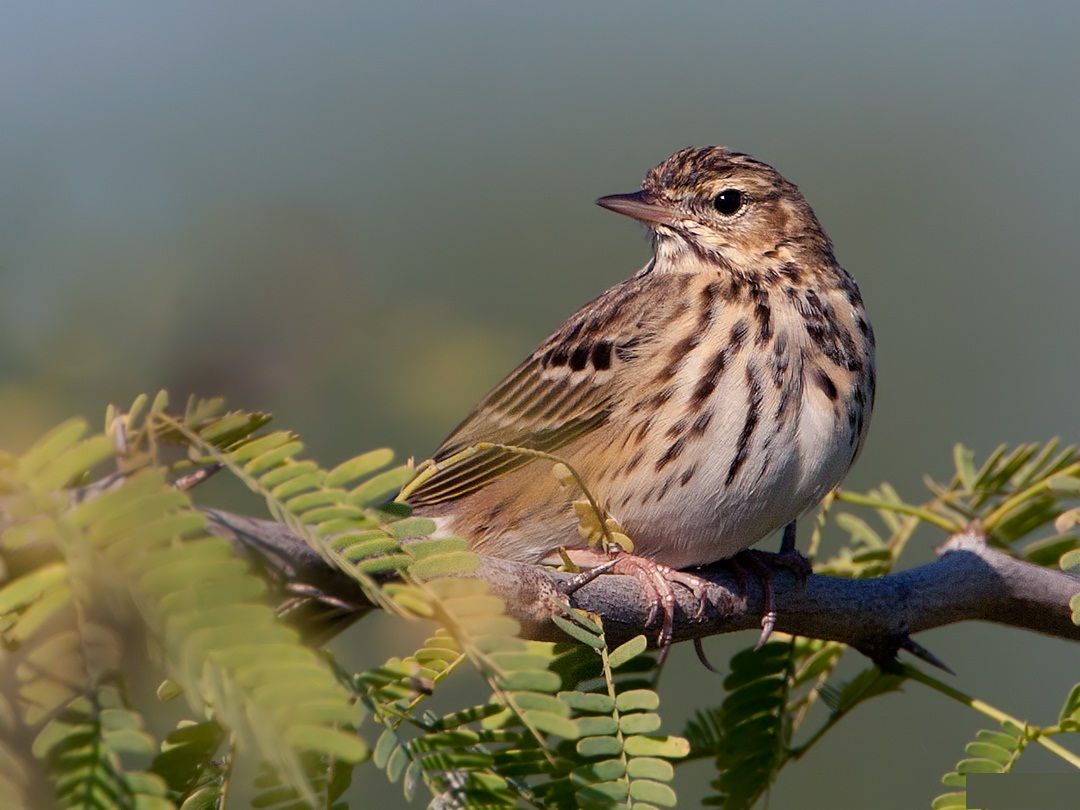
In India

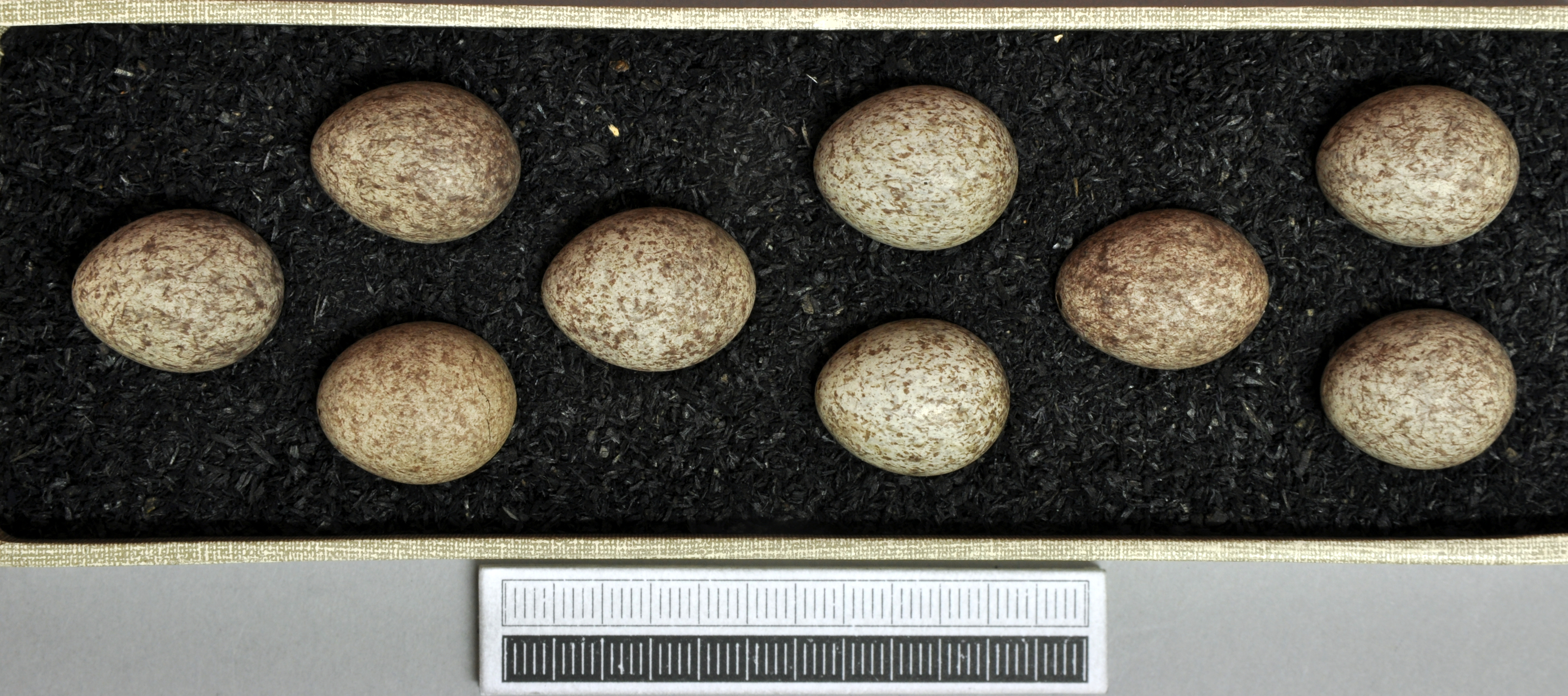
Eggs, Collection Museum Wiesbaden, Germany

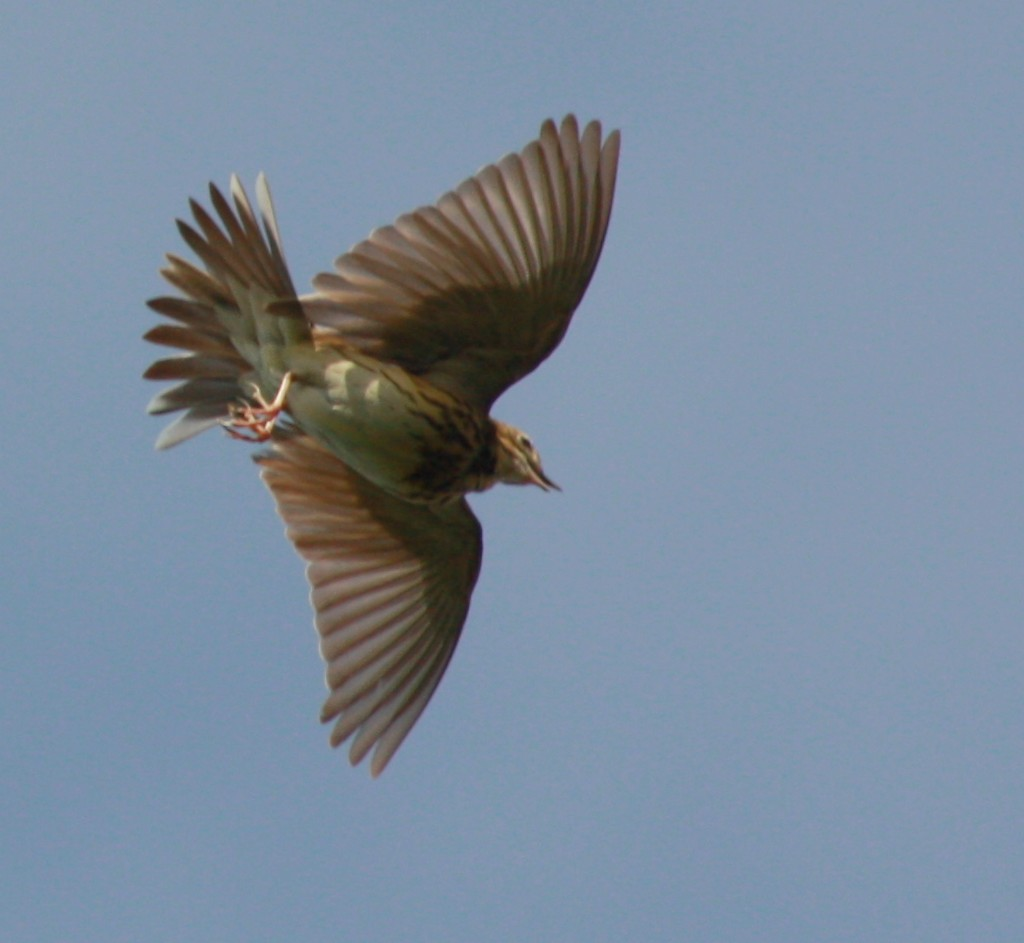
In flight

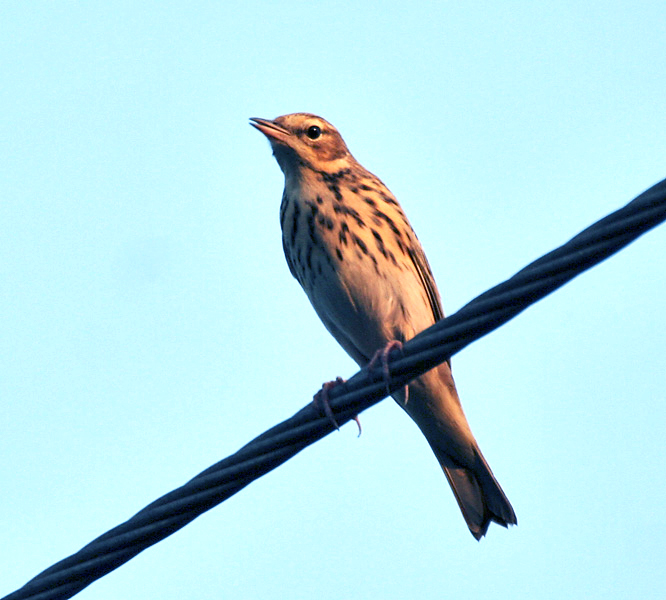
In Gujarat, India

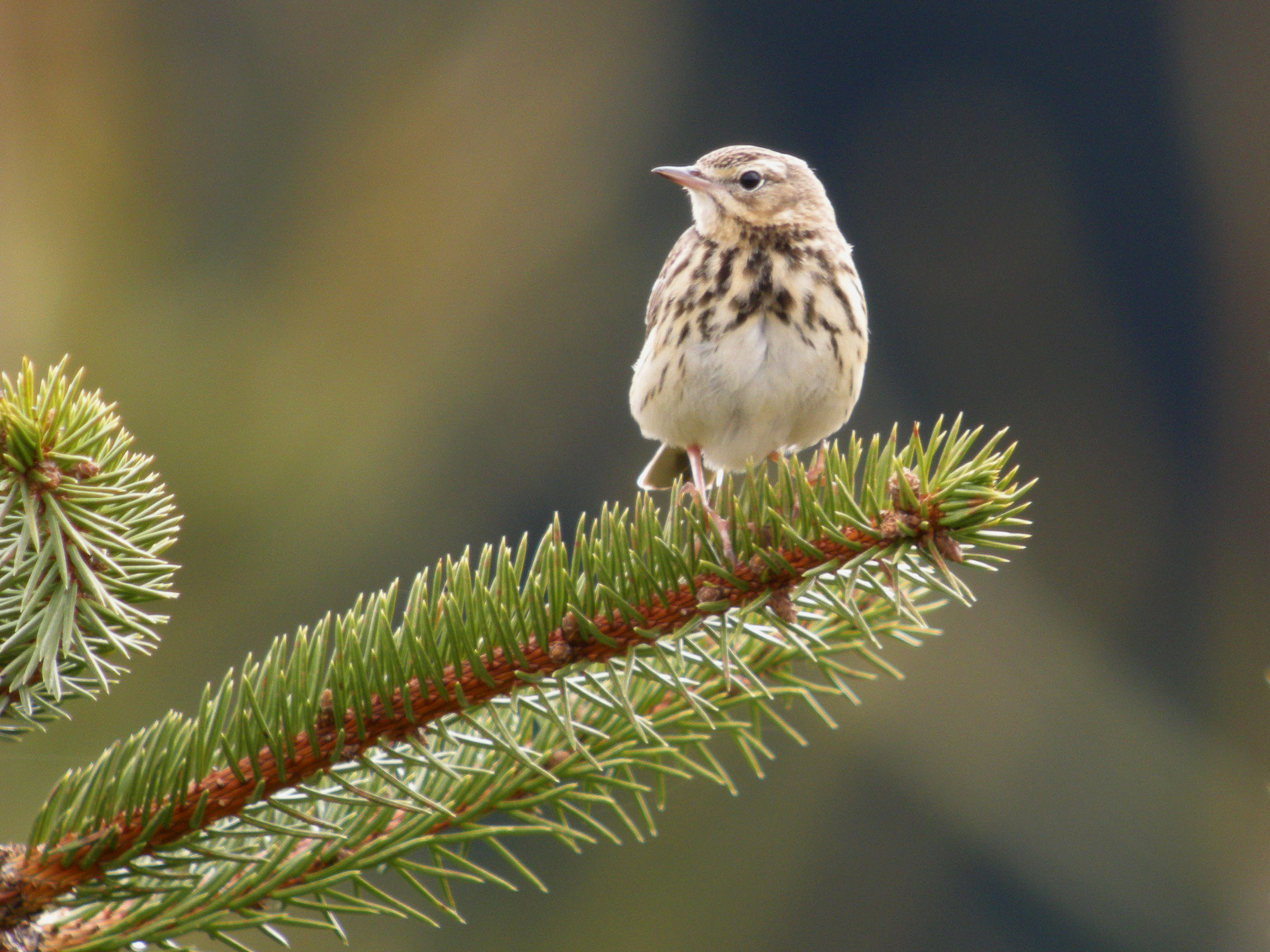
In Belgium

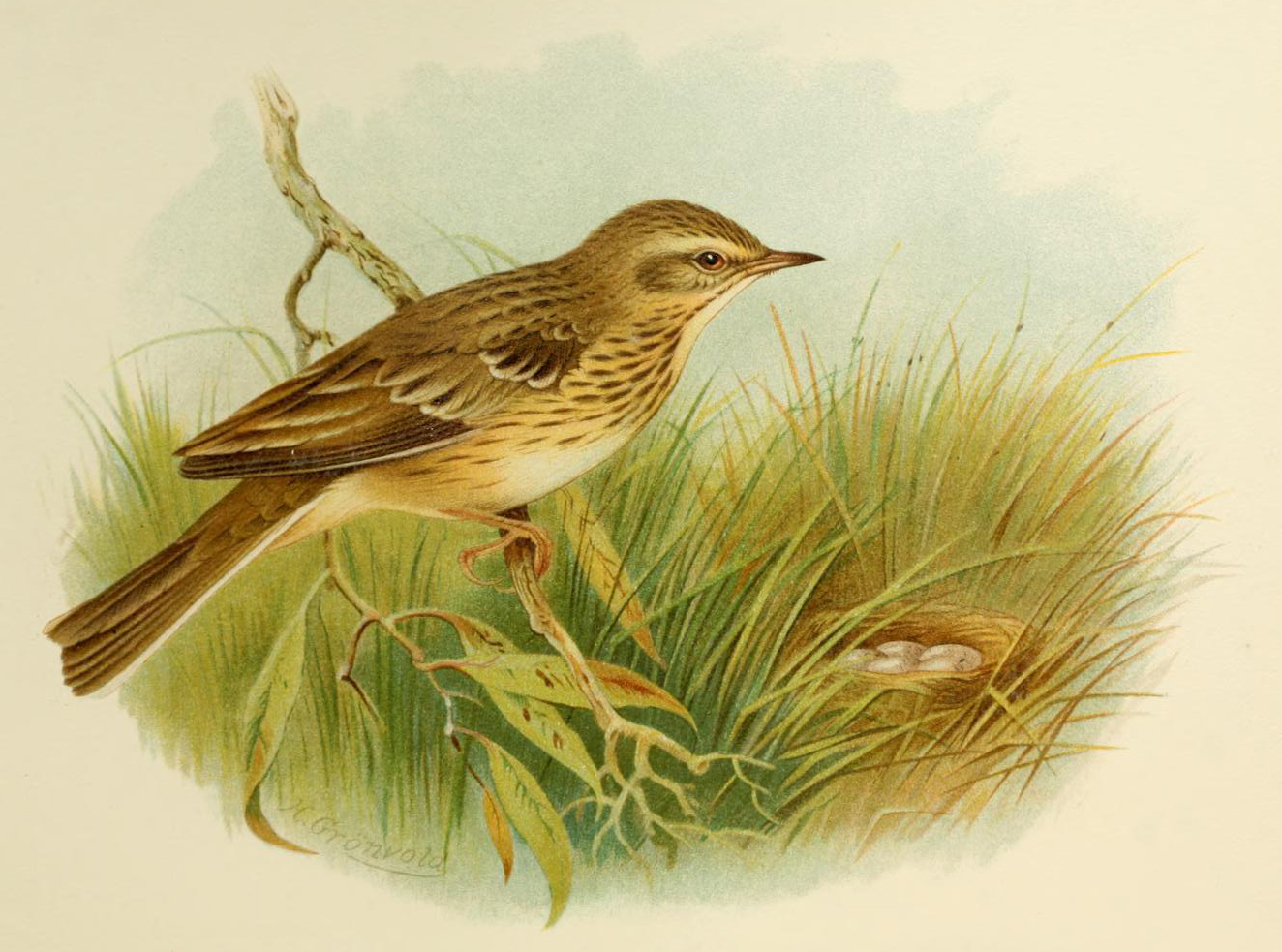
Historical illustration from 1907–1908 by Henrik Grönvold

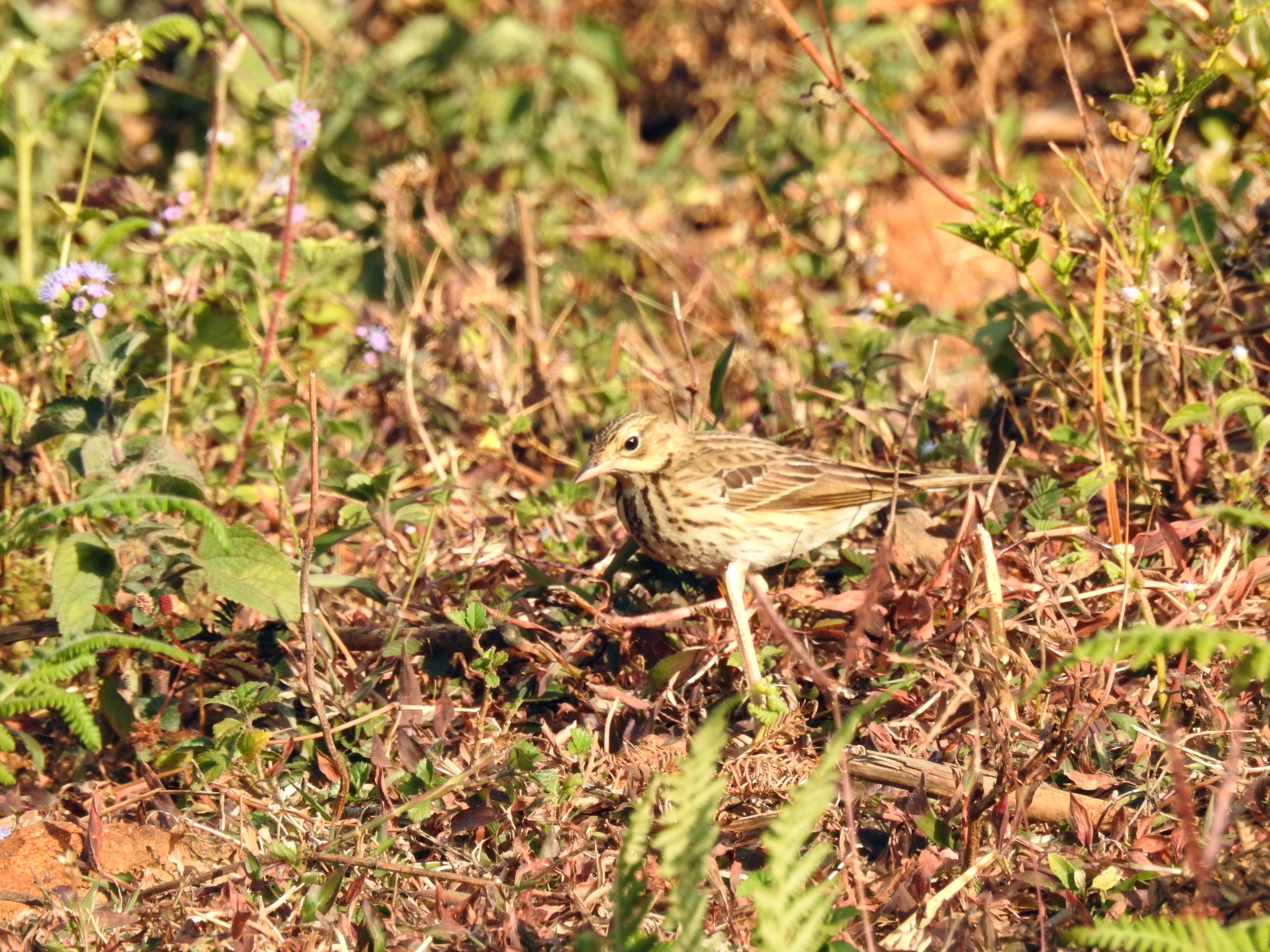
Tree pipit wintering in Anamalai Hills, India

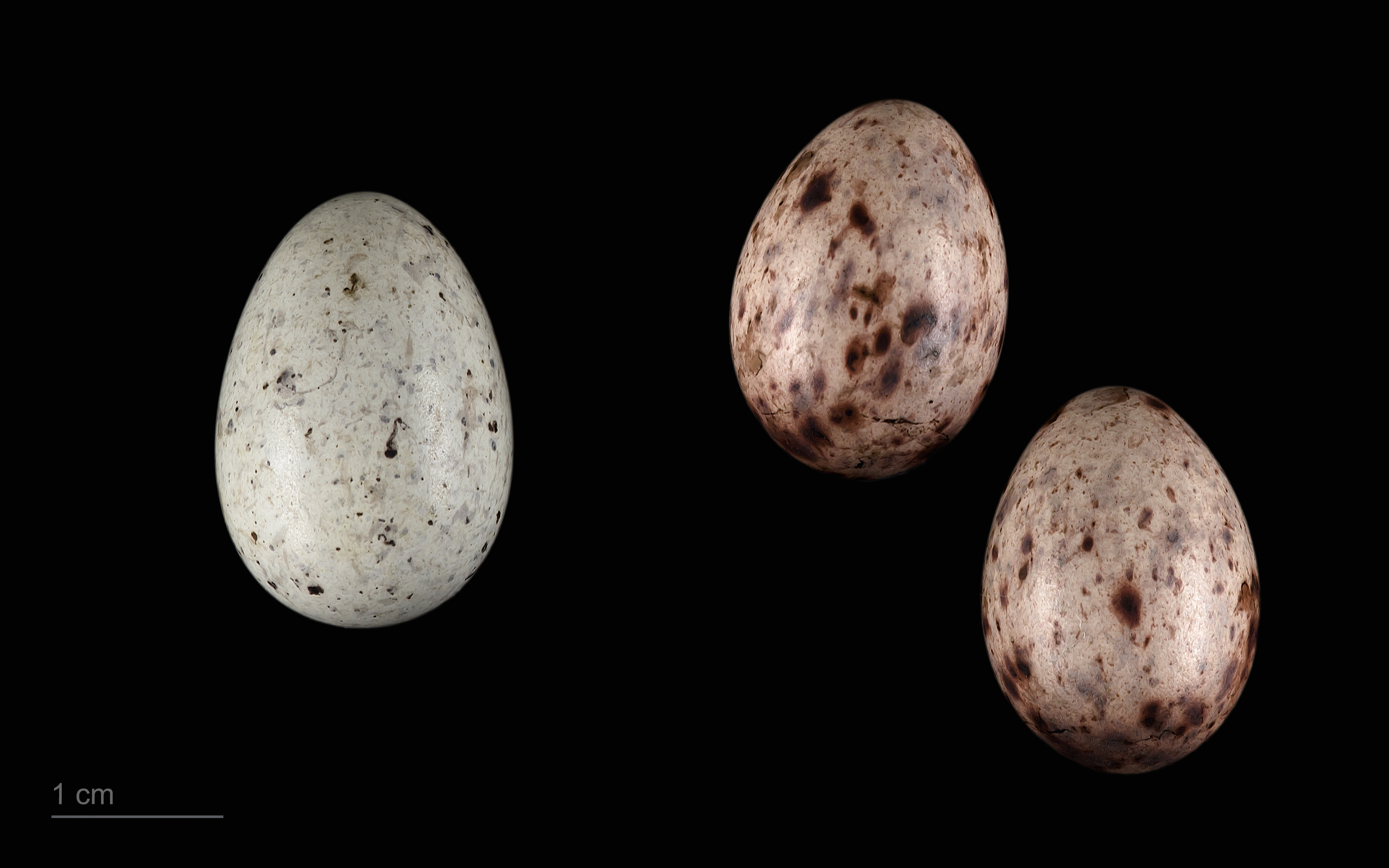
Cuculus canorus canorus in a clutch of Anthus trivialis - MHNT

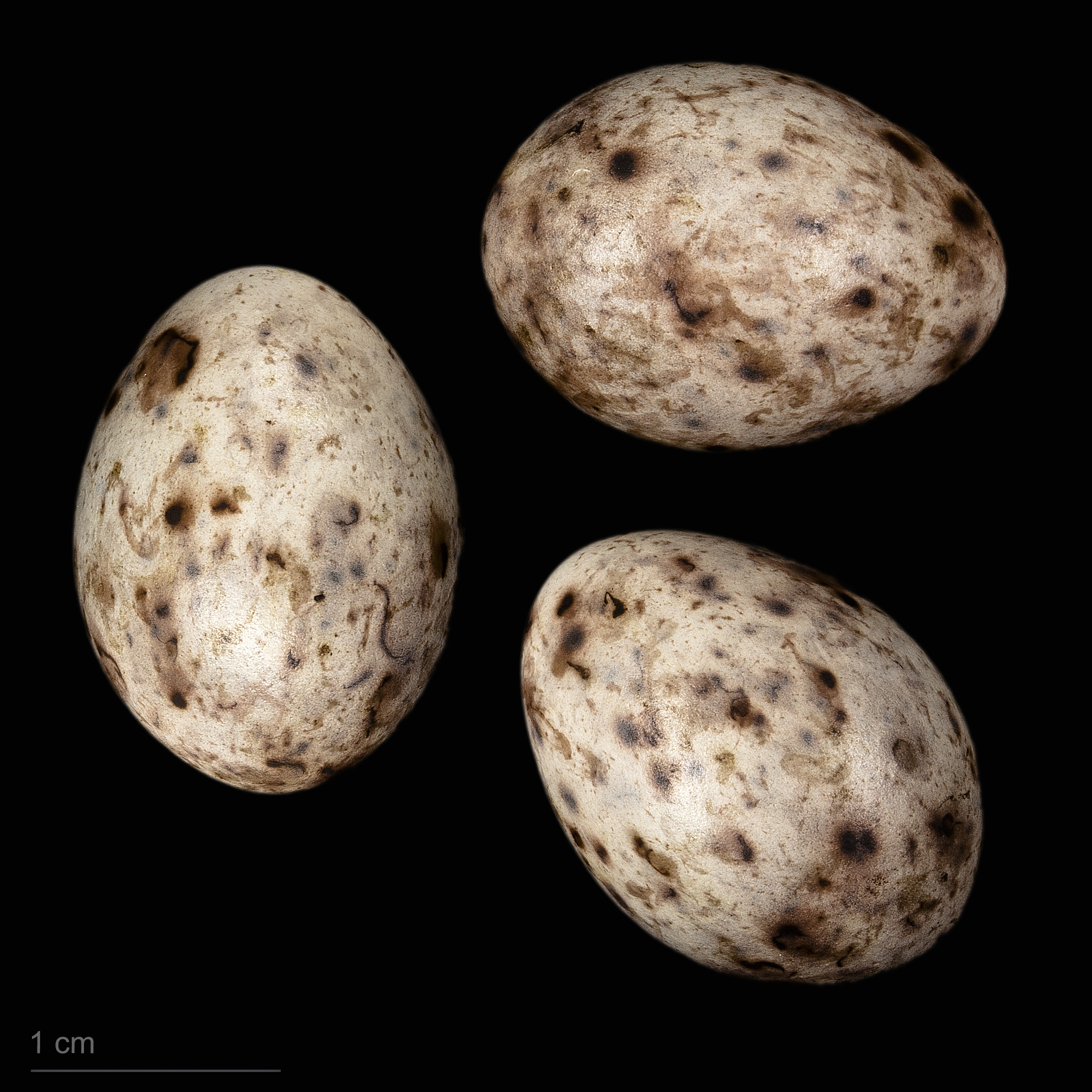
Anthus trivialis trivialis - MHNT
