= East Devon Way =

38-mile footpath in south-west England

Coordinates: 50.707°N 3.096°W

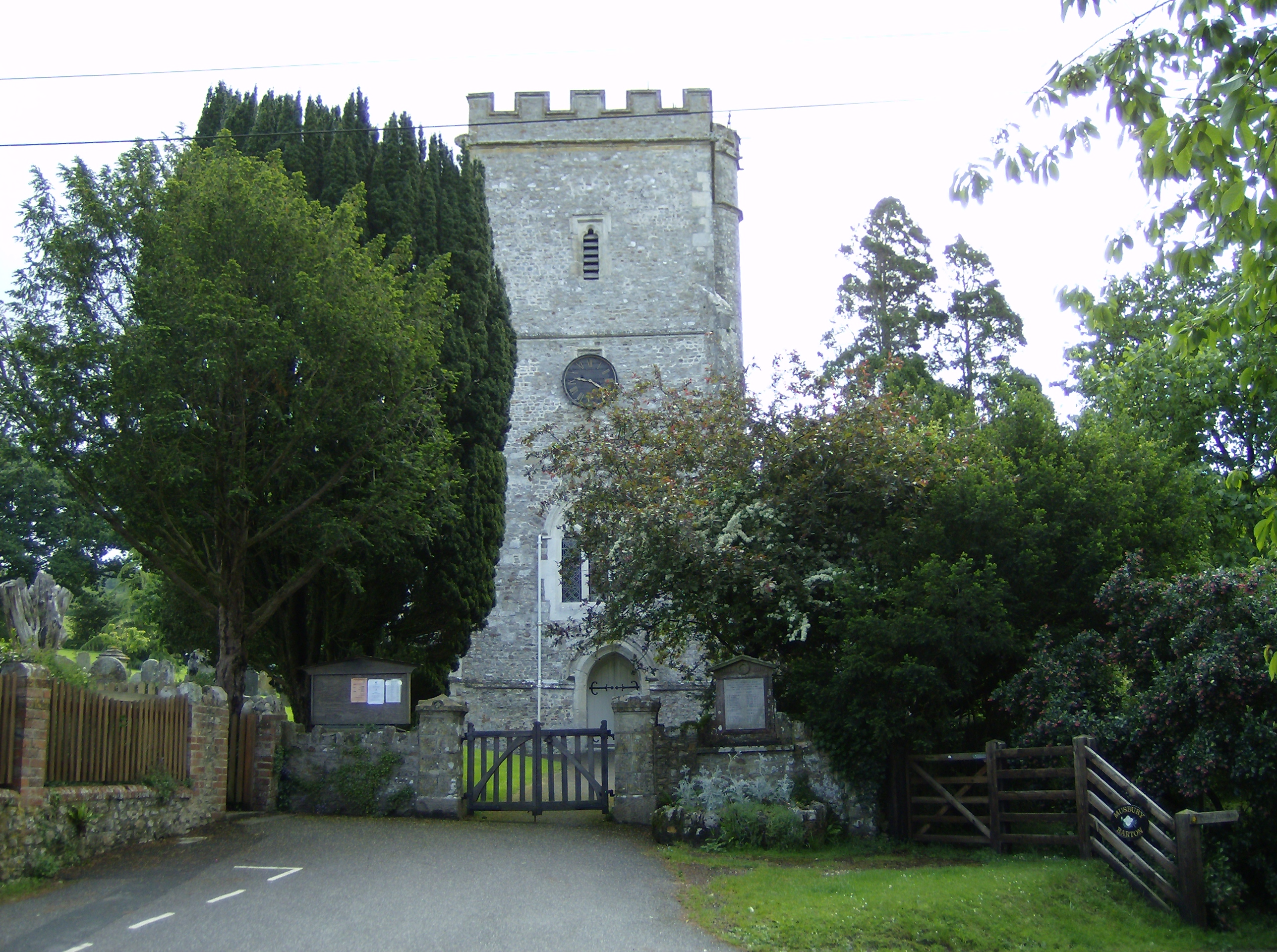
- The church at Musbury lies near the trail
- Length: 38 mi (61 km)
- Location: South West England
- Designation: UK National Trail
- Trailheads: Exmouth, Devon; Lyme Regis, Dorset
- Use: Hiking

The East Devon Way is a long-distance footpath in England. It runs for 38 miles (61 km) between Exmouth in East Devon and Lyme Regis in Dorset.

Landscapes seen on the path include estuary, high open commons, woodlands and river valleys. The route includes some fairly steep climbs but is generally not challenging.

The path runs inland but links with the South West Coast Path at both ends. There is rail access to Exmouth via branch line from Exeter and buses serve both ends of the route.

== Landscape features ==
- The Jurassic Coast, a 95-mile (153 km) long World Heritage Site
- River Axe
- River Lym
- River Coly
- River Exe estuary
- River Otter
- River Sid
- The Cobb breakwater and fossils at Lyme Regis

== Places ==
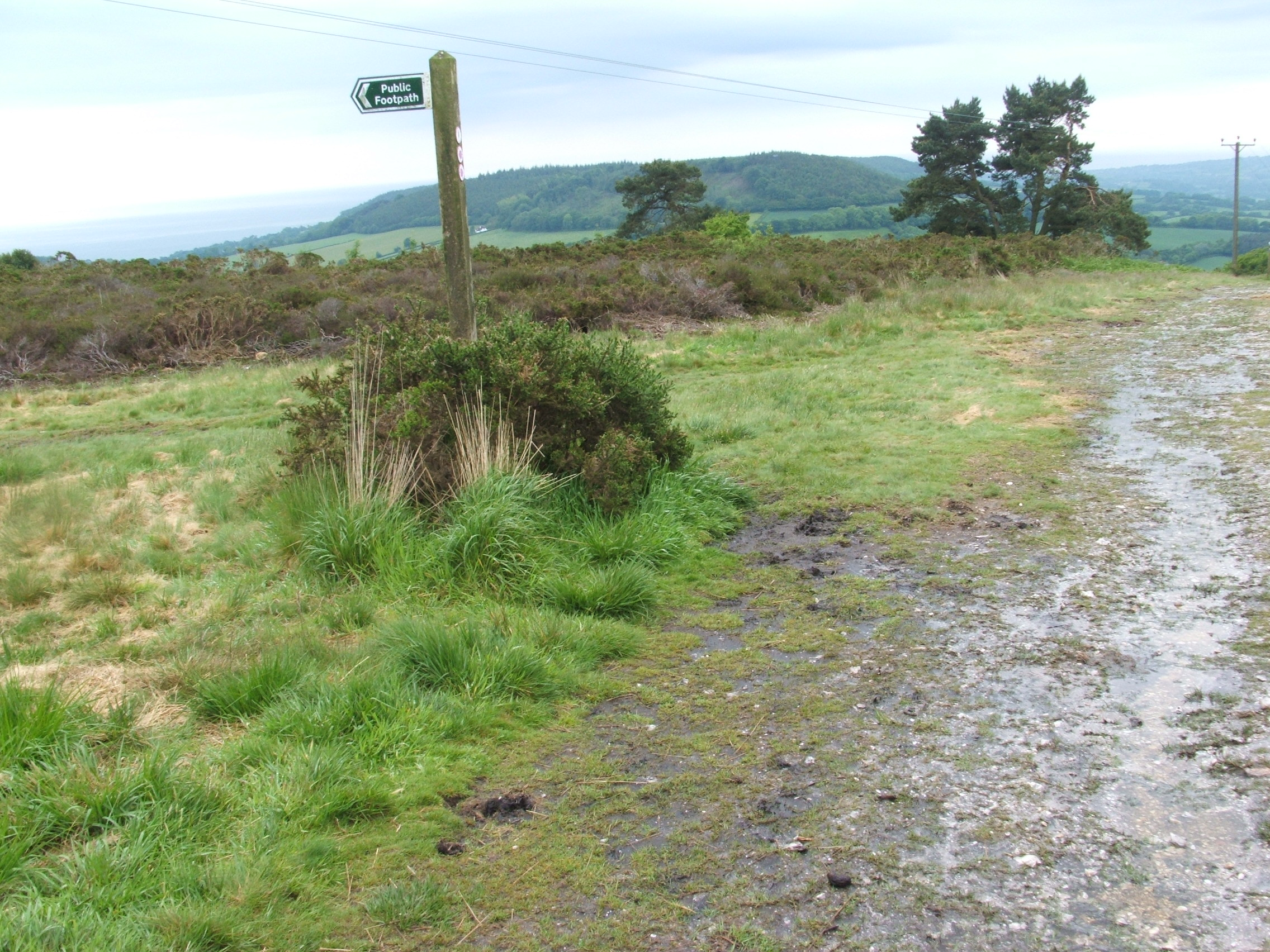
East Devon way and footpath running through the Fire Beacon Hill site

- Exmouth
- Newton Poppleford
- Sidbury
- Colyton
- Musbury
- Uplyme
- Fire Beacon Hill
