= Logical Information Machines =

Logical Information Machines, Inc.
- Industry: Software
- Founded: 1988; 38 years ago in Chicago, Illinois
- Founder: Tony Kolton
- Defunct: 2009; 17 years ago
- Fate: Acquired by Morningstar, Inc.

Logical Information Machines, Inc. (LIM) was a software company based in Chicago, Illinois, United States. It marketed Historis, a time series database and the Market Information Machine (MIM), a database that is built around Historis, and includes data and a near-English query language.

The Market Information Machine (MIM) was invented in 1988 by Tony Kolton, President and CEO of LIM, Danette Chimenti, LIM Director of Strategic Research and Ruben Gamboa, LIM Senior Technical Consultant. Danette sits on the board of directors and Ruben is on the Technical Advisory Board for LIM.

Historis, unlike a relational database, is optimized and designed to handle the large storage issues and fast data retrieval speeds required by time-series data (real-time, intraday, daily, weekly, monthly).

In December 2009, Morningstar, Inc. announced that it had agreed to buy LIM for $50.5 million.

== See also ==
- Time series database
