= Raymond's Hill =

Village in Devon, England

Coordinates: 50.7624°N 2.9682°W

- Location within Devon
- Population: 726
- OS grid reference: SY325965
- Shire county: Devon
- Region: South West
- Country: England
- Sovereign state: United Kingdom
- Post town: AXMINSTER
- Postcode district: EX13
- Dialling code: 01297
- Police: Devon and Cornwall
- Fire: Devon and Somerset
- Ambulance: South Western
- UK Parliament: Honiton and Sidmouth

Raymond's Hill is a village and residential area off the A35 road in Devon, England, right on the border with the county of Dorset. It is about 2 miles (3.2 km) southeast of Axminster in East Devon, and about 3 miles (4.8 km) northwest of Charmouth in Dorset.

The housing is of low density and moderate value, and is surrounded by a forest and heathland protected by the District Council.

In 2002 the local MP Hugo Swire presented a 2,225 signature petition to Parliament on behalf of the residents, calling for a roundabout to be constructed at the accident blackspot at the junction of the A35 road and the B3165 at the Hunters Lodge Inn, Raymond's Hill which has claimed many lives.

In 2004, the Highways Agency completed a safety improvement scheme including new signs, red anti-skid surfacing and two traffic islands, though no roundabout has been installed.

In September 2013, two months after a series of car accidents in which two people were killed, local MP Neil Parish held an inquiry into the same blackspot, and vowed to ensure that the Highways Agency improved the junction.
