= River Lym =

River in Dorset, England

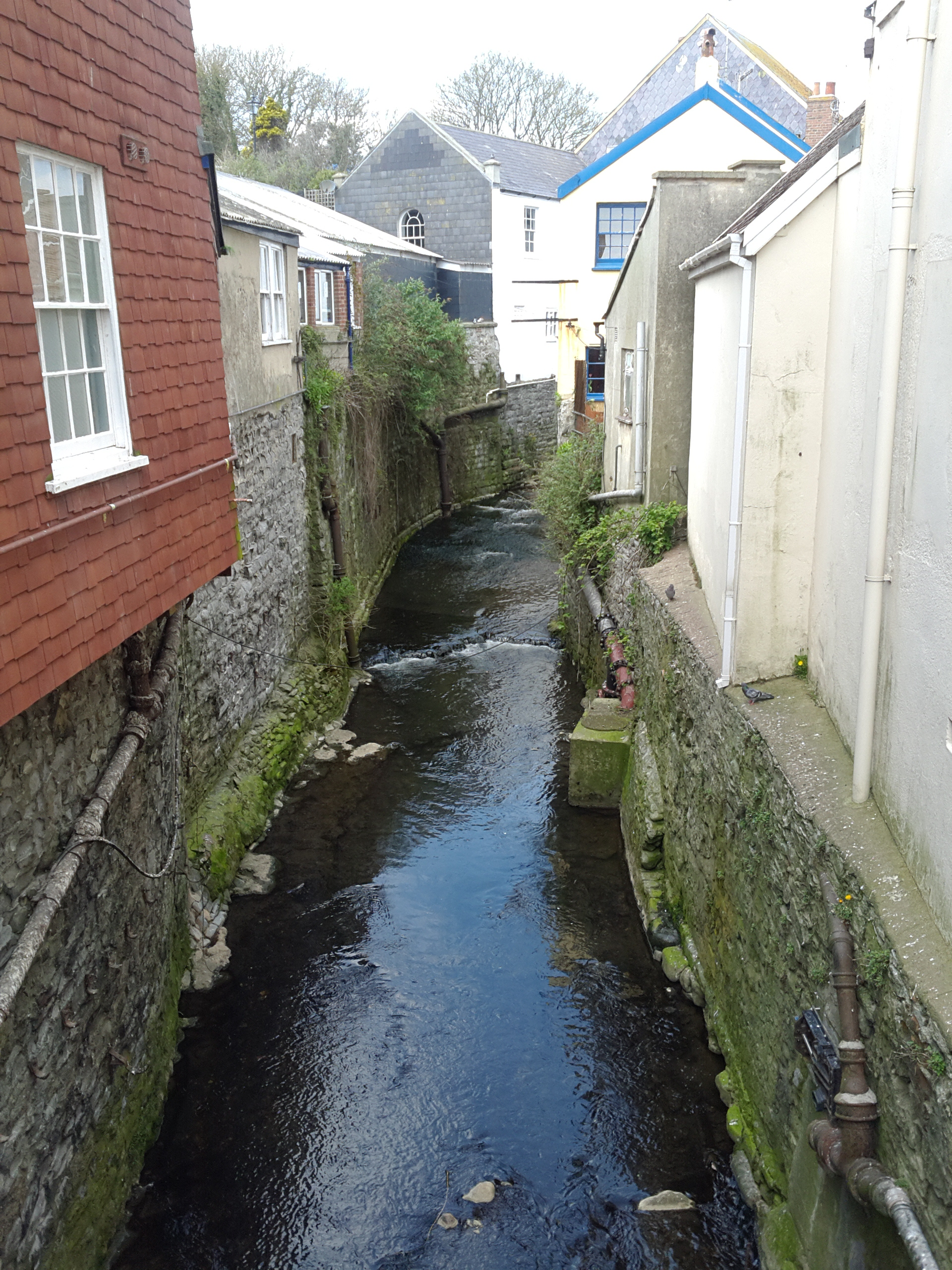
- The river in Lyme Regis

Location
- Country: United Kingdom

Physical characteristics
- Source
  - location: Raymonds Hill, near Uplyme, East Devon
- Mouth
  - location: English Channel, Lyme Bay, Dorset
  - coordinates: 50.7244°N 2.9326°W
- Length: 5.0 km (3.1 mi)

The River Lym or River Lim is a short river, some 5 km (3.1 mi) in length, that flows through the Devon-Dorset border. It rises from multiple springs at Raymond's Hill, near the village of Uplyme in East Devon, and flows southeasterly through Dorset, into the English Channel via Lyme Bay in the town of Lyme Regis, Dorset. The river falls over 200 metres from its source.

Some of the northern parts of the river are partly underground, and some points at Lyme Regis are culverted. Lyme Regis has grown around the southern course of the river, with residential houses, holiday cottages and bridges connected to it. In Saxon times, the abbots of Sherborne Abbey had salt-boiling rights on land adjacent to the River Lym, and in the 12th century the river powered three watermills, however today Town Mill, dating back to at least 1340, is the only watermill still in use.

== Etymology ==
The name is of British origin and probably cognate with the Welsh llif meaning flood or stream. The River Lym (or Lim) appears in the Domesday Book.

== Course ==
Some 5 km (3.1 mi) in length, the River Lym rises from a group of springs in Raymond's Hill near the village of Uplyme in East Devon. It flows southward down a steep hill past a cricket ground and tennis courts into Uplyme, before flowing east at Church Street to Tappers Knapp in Devon. After about 1 km (0.621 mi) it resumes a southwesterly course, crossing into Dorset, and flows into the town of Lyme Regis, where it flows past residential houses, holiday cottages and under bridges, alongside Windsor Terrace, then Jericho, before reaching an intersection between Mill Green and Coombe Street – known as the Lynch – where it briefly splits in two, with the east side powering Town Mill – the only present watermill in the area. The west side of the river continues its southerly course and turns slightly west for about 50 m (164 ft), flows for another 150 m (492 ft) under a culvert and eventually Buddle Bridge – an English Grade I listed building – before flowing into the English Channel via Lyme Bay in Lyme Regis. It falls over 200 metres from its source.

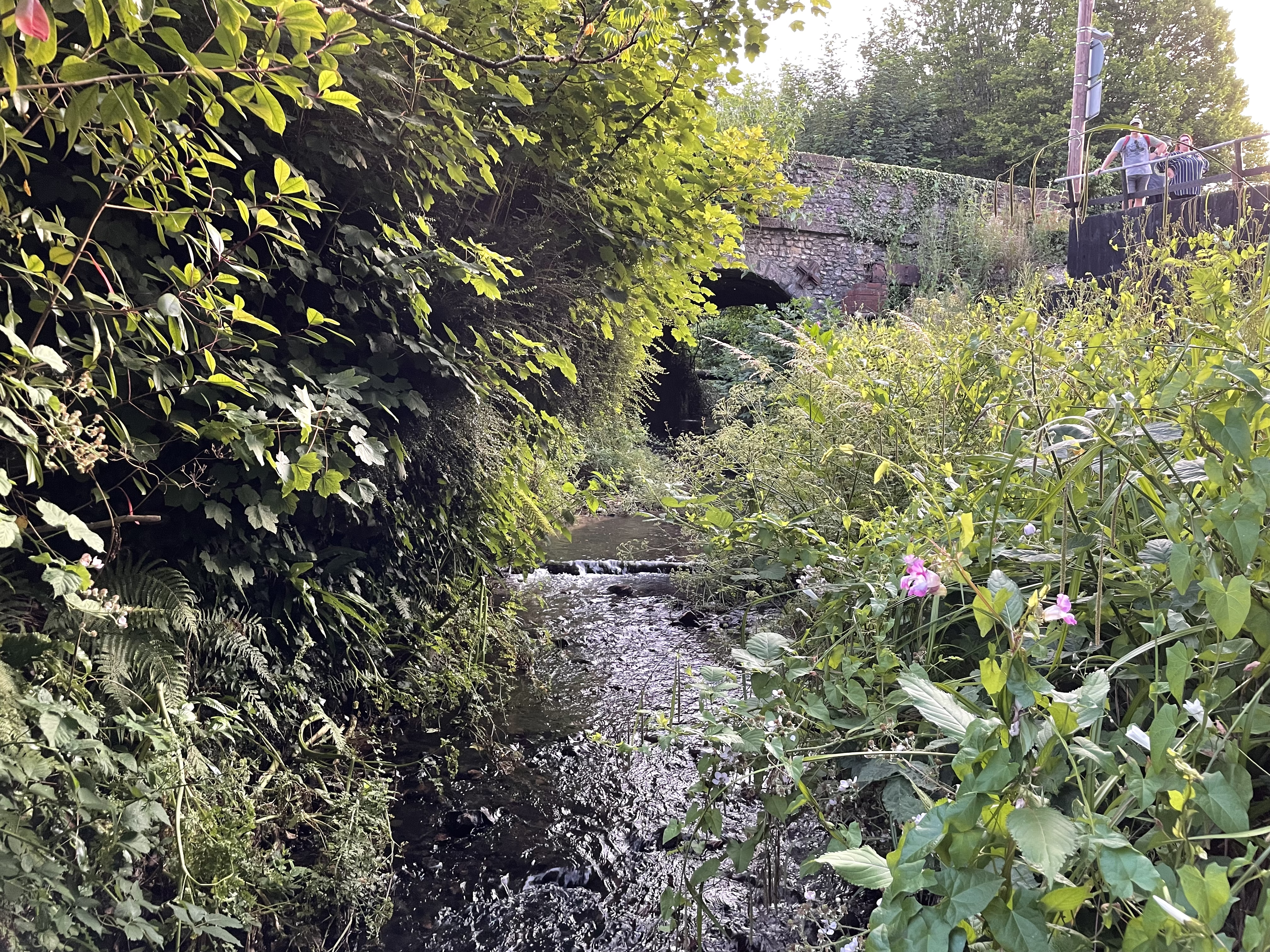
The River Lym in Uplyme, East Devon, near its source

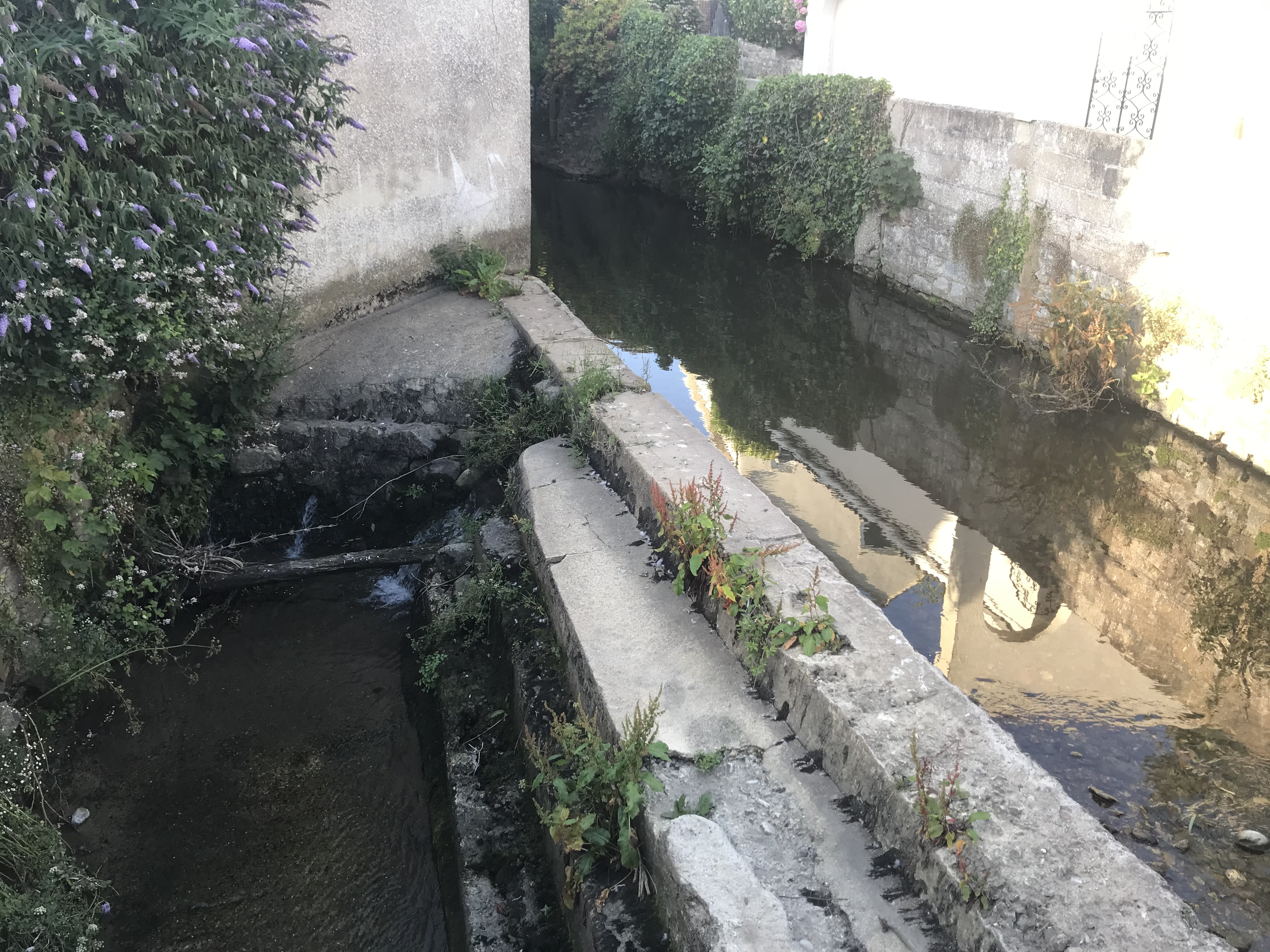
The right-side split near Mill Green and Coombe Street (named the Lynch) powers Town Mill (Note: Also visible on the left building is a now faded, stencilled origami crane by graffiti artist Banksy.)

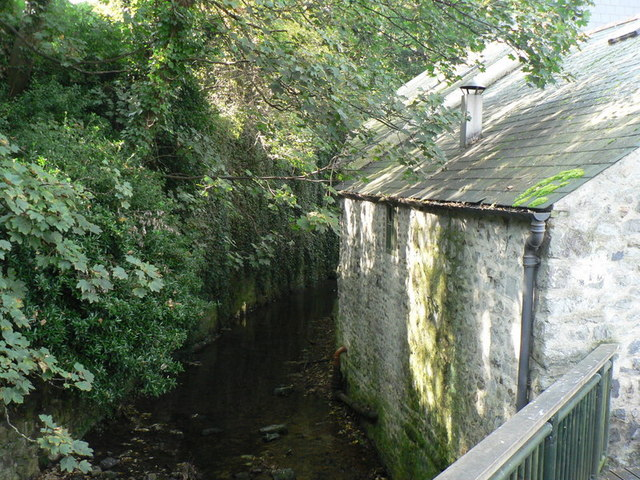
The river, flowing behind Town Mill

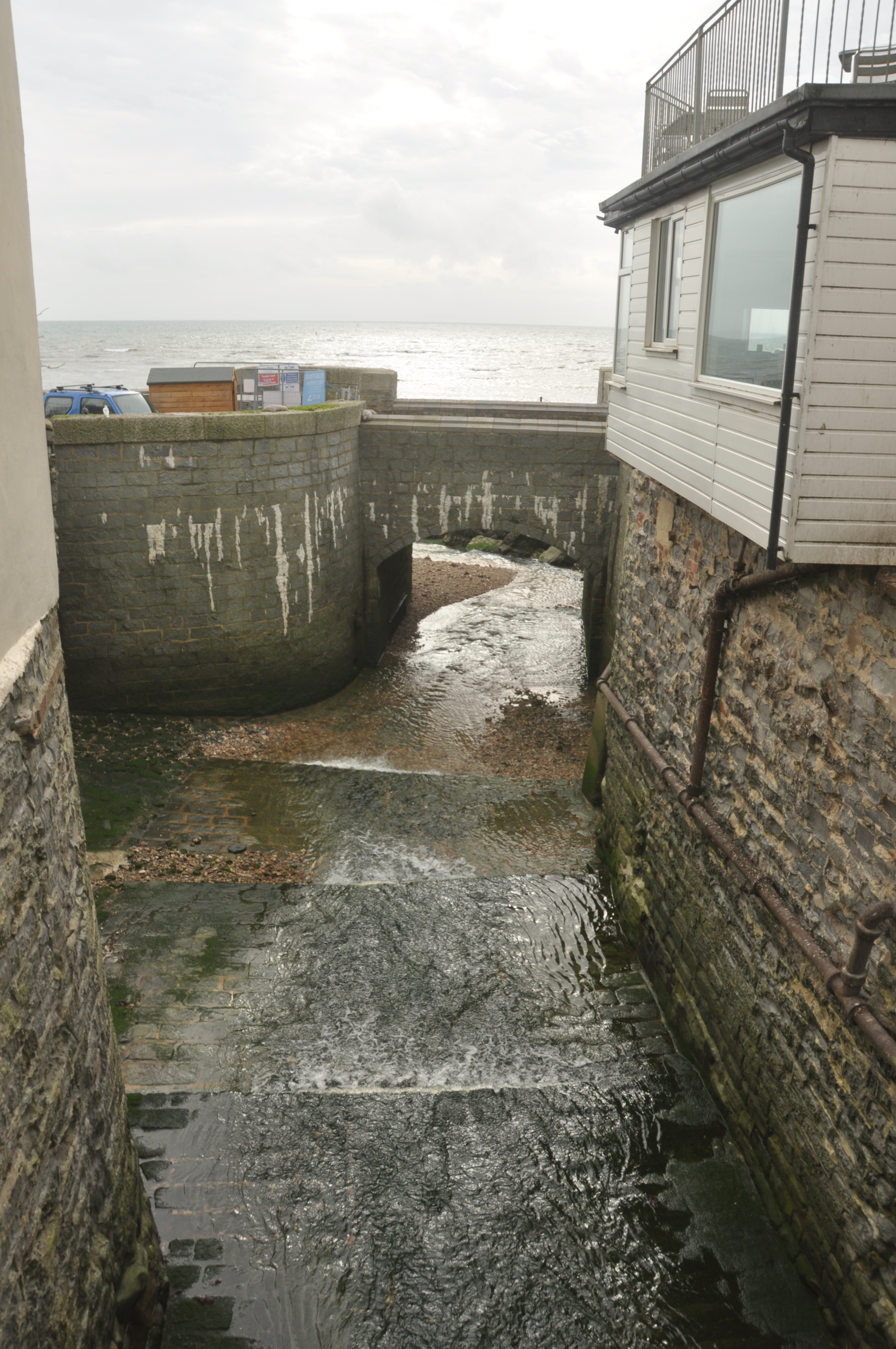
The River Lym flows into the English Channel

== Human activity ==
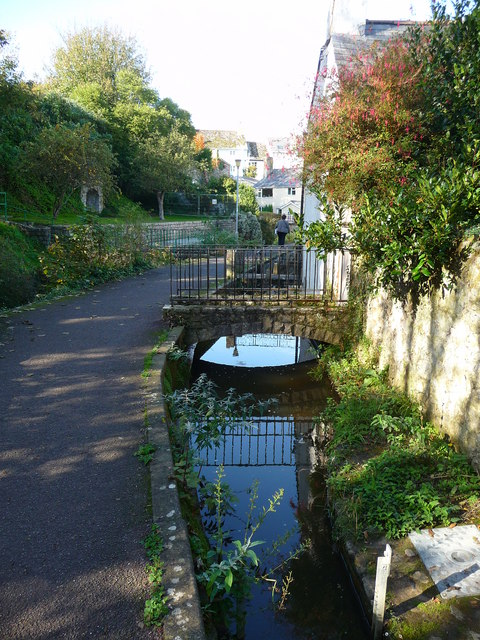
Residential houses built around the river

The town of Lyme Regis has grown around the south part of the river, with residential houses, holiday cottages, bridges and a watermill connected to it. The River Lim Path is a recreational footpath designated alongside the river. Three other recreational footpaths, the Wessex Ridgeway, Liberty Trail and East Devon Way, coincide with sections of the river. Buddle Bridge, which crosses over the river at Lyme Regis, became a Grade I listed building by Historic England in 1952.

In Saxon times, the abbots of Sherborne Abbey had salt-boiling rights on land adjacent to the River Lym. Town Mill, a watermill dating from 1340, is powered by the River Lym via a leat running along a lynch. The Domesday Book records a mill at Lyme in 1086, so the site may be much older. After being restored, the mill now produces flour. In 2012, graffiti artist Banksy stencilled an origami crane on a wall adjacent to the River Lym at the intersection of Mill Green and Coombe Street. In May 2023 an ecologist member of the River Lim Action Group declared that the river was "ecologically dead" following many sewage spills.

== Flooding ==
The usual water level of the river at Uplyme is between 0.00m and 0.79m. The river has flooded on several occasions, usually after heavy rainfall. The most costly was in 1890, when residents of Coombe Street had to be evacuated.

== River Lym Path ==
The River Lym Path is a public footpath, 2.4 km (1.5 mi) long, that follows the River Lym from Town Mill in Lyme Regis, Dorset to Uplyme in Devon. It was funded and supported by the Coastal Communities Fund, and the footpath also forms part of the East Devon Way. The Uplyme Parish Council published a guide pamphlet. Improvements were coordinated by Lyme Forward and the Dorset Coast Forum in 2018 and 2019, and a local furniture maker and artist built animal houses and seating areas themed around the old watermills alongside the path.
