= Exeter–Plymouth line =

Railway line in Devon, England

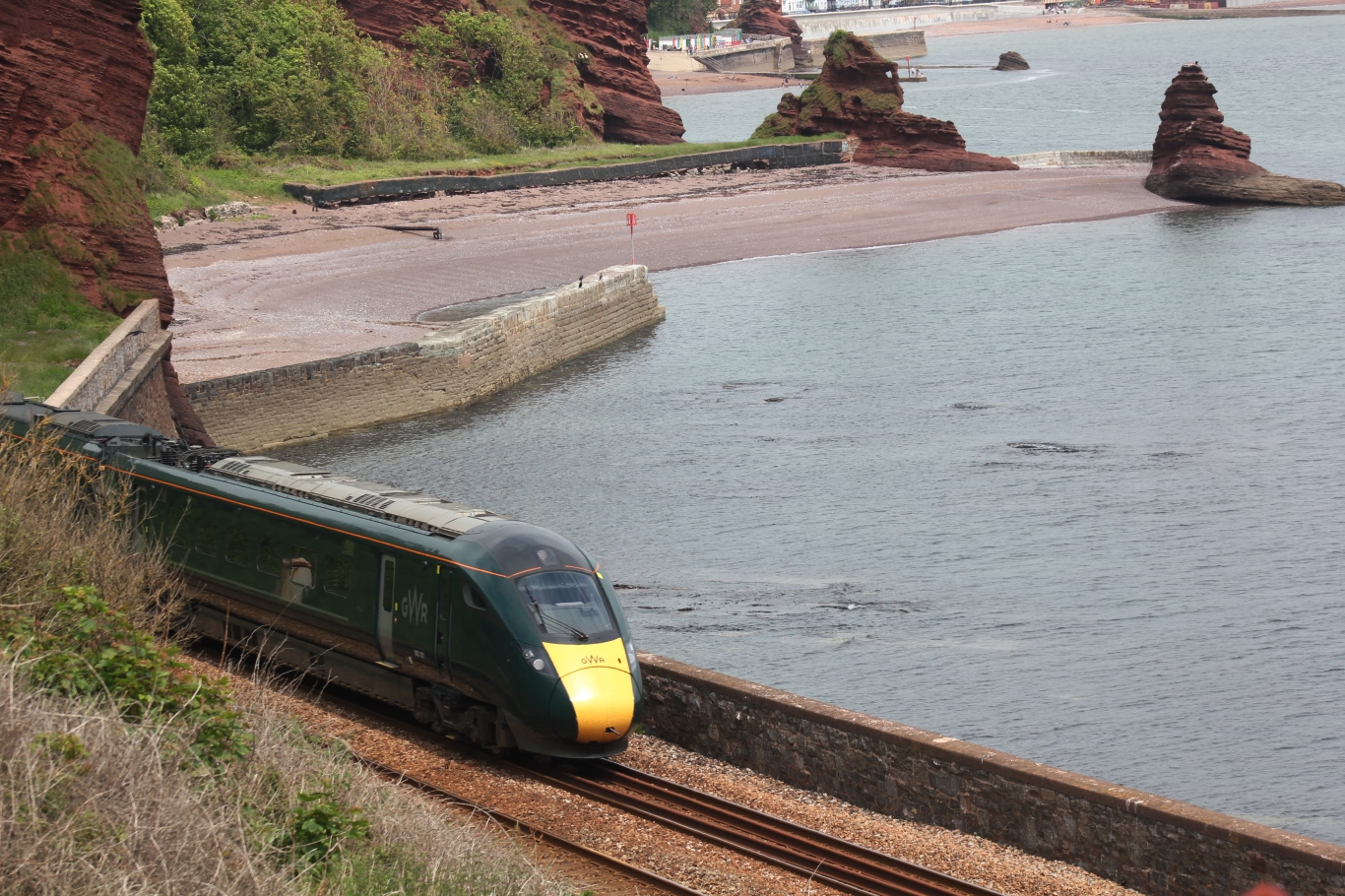
- A Great Western Railway Class 802 near Dawlish

Overview
- Status: Operational
- Owner: Network Rail
- Locale: South West England
- Termini: Exeter St Davids, Plymouth

Service
- Type: Suburban rail, Heavy rail
- System: National Rail
- Operator(s): Great Western Railway, CrossCountry

History
- Opened: 1846-1849

Technical
- Number of tracks: 2
- Track gauge: 4 ft 8 1/2 in (1,435 mm) standard gauge
- Old gauge: 7 ft 1/4 in (2,140 mm)
- Operating speed: 100 mph (160 km/h) maximum
Route map
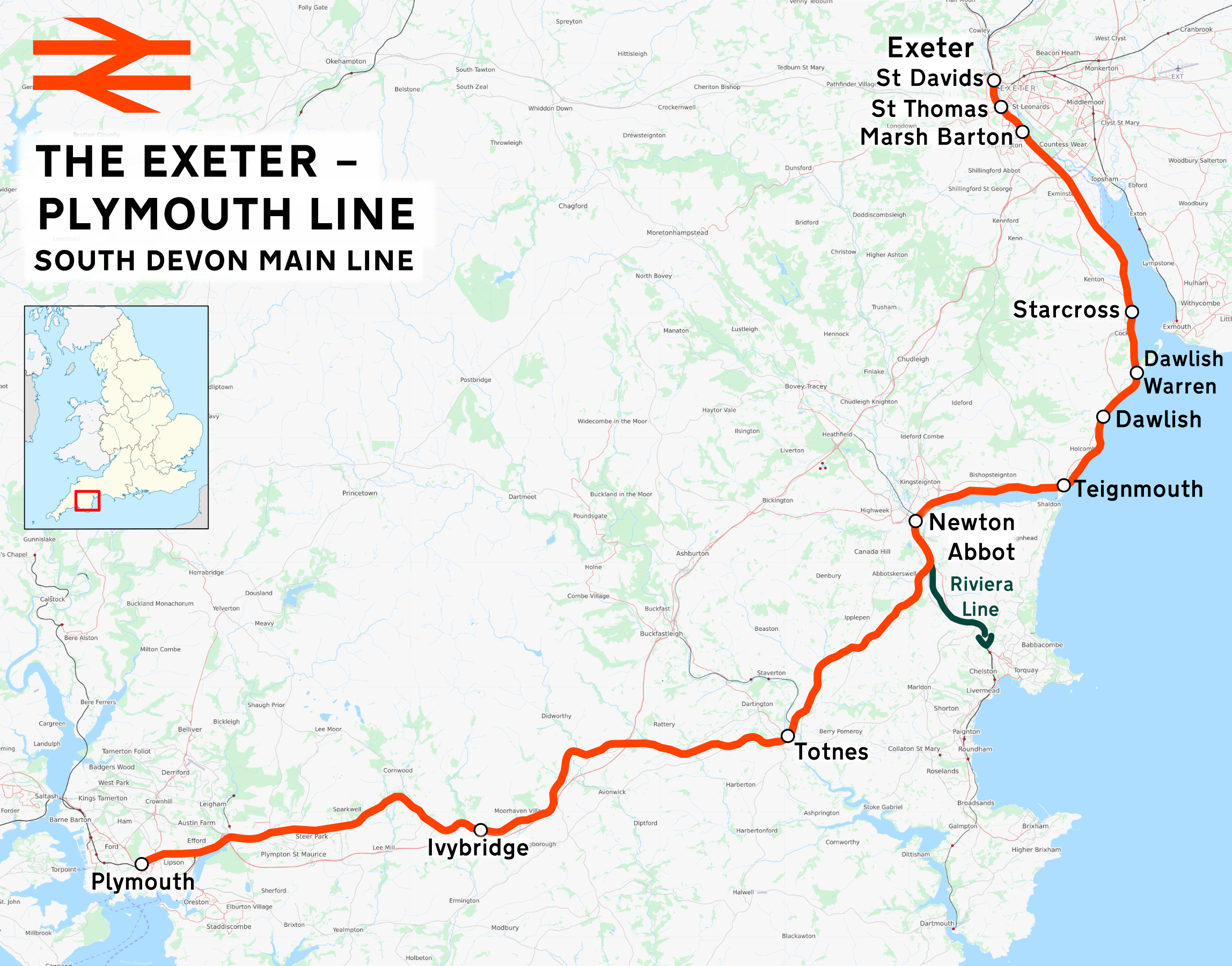
(Click to expand)

The Exeter–Plymouth line, also called the South Devon Main Line, is a central part of the trunk railway line between London Paddington and Penzance in South West England. It is a major branch of the Great Western Main Line and runs from Exeter St Davids to Plymouth, from where it continues as the Cornish Main Line. It was one of the principal routes of the Great Western Railway and became part of the Western Region of British Railways in 1948; it is presently owned by Network Rail.

The line between Exeter and Plymouth was built and operated originally by the South Devon Railway Company. It was constructed during the mid-to-late 1840s; its engineering was highly influenced by Isambard Kingdom Brunel, especially in the choice to incorporate a novel atmospheric railway propulsion system. The railway was built in stages, with the first section opening on 30 May 1846. On 25 February 1847, the atmospheric apparatus was used for the first time; all services on the line were operated on the atmospheric system for the first time on 23 February 1848. Months later, it was recognised that the apparatus was struggling and thus the company decided to abandon all use of atmospheric propulsion. Conventional steam locomotives were adopted instead, while the atmospheric equipment was deactivated and gradually discarded.

The line was completed in its entity as a traditional railway during 1849. By 1 February 1876, the nominally independent companies in the region had all been amalgamated into the Great Western Railway (GWR); it was converted from broad gauge to standard gauge not long after. The line passed over to the newly-formed British Railways as a result of the GWR's nationalisation on 1 January 1948. The line was upgraded to permit higher top speeds during the 1980s, although it was not electrified as had been proposed. In the mid 1990s, British Rail was privatised, thus the line was transferred to the private railway infrastructure company Railtrack and, after its collapse, its successor company Network Rail.

== History ==
=== Creation ===
The origin of the Exeter–Plymouth line is heavily associated with Isambard Kingdom Brunel, who became involved at an early stage as an adviser to the South Devon Railway Company formed to construct the railway. Brunel wielded considerable influence over both the planning and engineering aspects of the line, a factor that would lead to a controversial decision. Having been impressed by trial runs of atmospheric railway propulsion apparatus on the Dalkey Atmospheric Railway, Brunel advocated for the Exeter–Plymouth line to be built with atmospheric propulsion. Other key figures within the company, such as the chairman Thomas Gill, were won over on the matter and the installation of atmospheric apparatus was approved.

The line was constructed and opened in sections. The first such section, between Exeter and Teignmouth, was opened to passenger traffic on 30 May 1846. The extension of the railway to Newton was protracted; accordingly, the first regular service was run on 30 December 1846. On 20 July 1847, the line was opened to passenger traffic from Newton Abbot to Totnes; the first goods trains followed on 6 December 1847.

Initially, all trains running on the line were hauled exclusively by conventional steam locomotives; the first use of the atmospheric railway apparatus is believed to have taken place on 25 February 1847, immediately following the delivery of the first piston carriage. On 18 August of that year, an atmospheric-powered goods train, hauling eleven goods wagons and weighing 120 long tons (122 t; 134 short tons), travelled the 8 1/4 miles (13.3 km) distance from Exeter to Starcross; this feat made the South Devon Railway the first, and the only, line that ran goods trains using the atmospheric system. On 8 September 1847, the first public use of the system took place with the running of four atmospheric-powered trains that day; however, trains could not traverse the whole line without switching between conventional locomotives and atmospheric traction, a time-consuming process. On 23 February 1848, the entire train service was operated on the atmospheric system for the first time. Atmospheric working was extended to Newton Abbot on 10 January 1848.

However, it had become clear that the propulsion apparatus was being taxed heavily even on relatively level sections by the majority of trains. The company lost faith in the atmospheric railway concept and regarded it as a failure. Steam locomotives rapidly took over; on 10 September 1848, the final atmospheric-propelled train arrived at Exeter, after which the system was permanently deactivated. Brunel himself later stated: "I have no hesitation in taking on myself the full and entire responsibility for recommending the adoption of the atmospheric system in the South Devon Railway, and of recommending as a consequence that the line and works should be constructed for a single line only." Daniel Gooch, Brunel's locomotive engineer, later voiced that Brunel had been misled in his decision and had not considered the potential for the technology to fail.

Construction of the rest of the line proceeded. A dispute with the Plymouth and Dartmoor Railway (P&DR) broke out where the two lines crossed paths on the route to Laira Bridge; after track had been laid without agreement, the P&DR responded by depositing large blocks of granite to temporarily block the route. After this dispute was settled, the full extension of the line to Plymouth went ahead relatively smoothly; the company ran its first passenger services to Plymouth on 2 April 1849, while goods traffic commenced on 1 May 1849.

=== Changes and ownership ===
By 1 February 1876, the nominally independent companies in the region had all been amalgamated into the Great Western Railway. The remaining 7 ft 1/4 in (2,140 mm) broad gauge lines were closed on 20 May 1892 and converted to 4 ft 8 1/2 in (1,435 mm) standard gauge over the following weekend. A series of cut-off lines were constructed during the following 15 years which saw the through route established. The Great Western was nationalised on 1 January 1948 as part of the new British Railways (BR).

During 1977, the Parliamentary Select Committee on Nationalised Industries recommended considering electrification of more of Britain's rail network and, by 1979, BR presented a range of options to do so by 2000. Some included electrifying the Bristol to Exeter line, Exeter to Plymouth Line, Riviera Line and Cornish Main Line. Under the 1979–90 Conservative governments that succeeded the 1976–79 Labour government, the proposal was not implemented. Currently, there are no proposals to electrify the line.

During the 1980s, the line was resignalled, which permitted line speeds to be raised. In the mid 1990s, the line was transferred from British Rail to the newly-formed private railway infrastructure company Railtrack, as part of privatisation. Railtrack promptly collapsed, after which the line was transferred to its successor Network Rail] The maximum speed on the line is presently 100 miles per hour (160 km/h).

== Route ==
=== Exeter to Newton Abbot ===
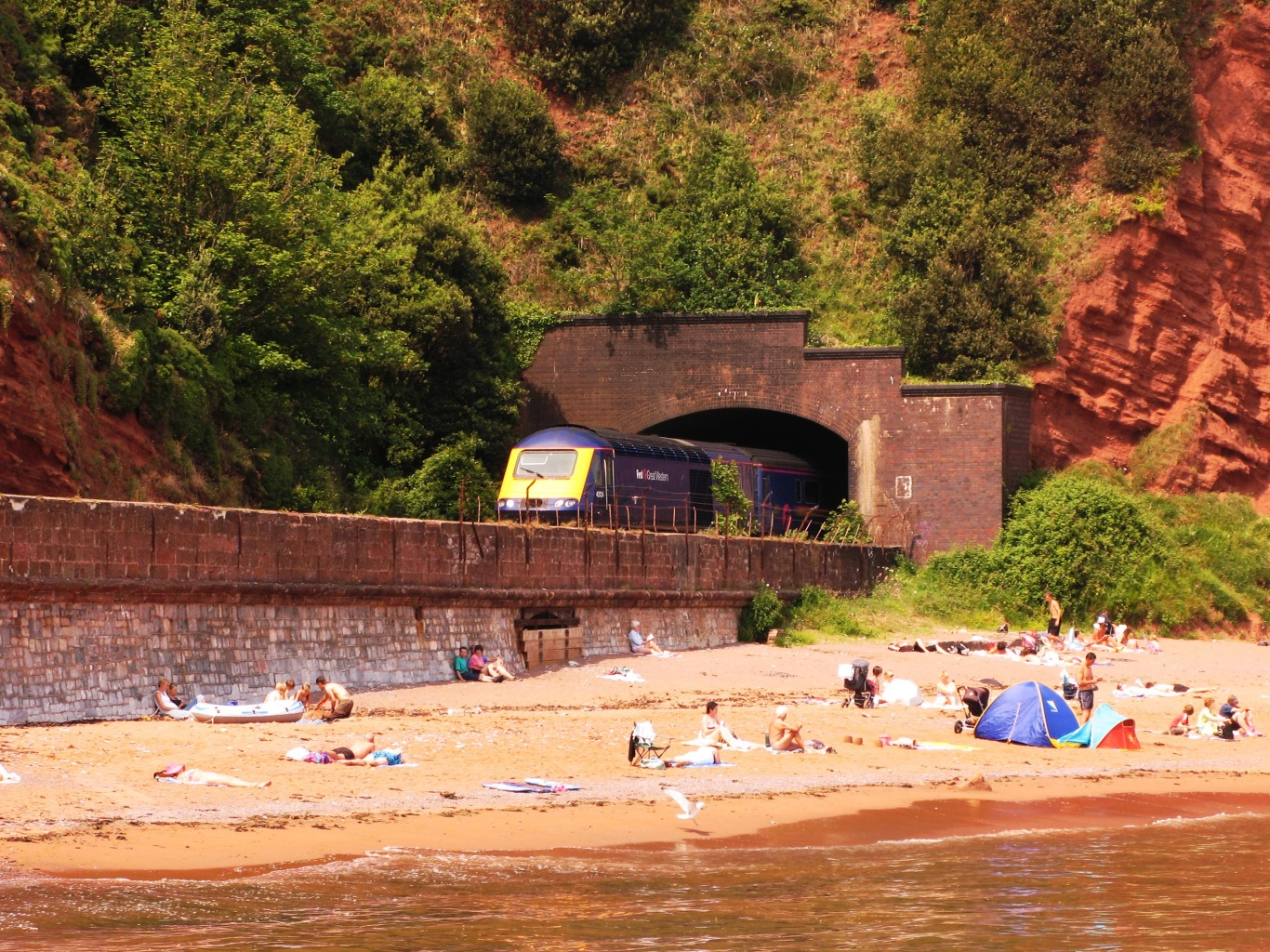
By the sea at Coryton Cove

Communities served: Exeter – Starcross (and Exmouth via a seasonal ferry service) – Dawlish Warren – Dawlish – Teignmouth – Newton Abbot.

On leaving Exeter St Davids the line to Exeter Central climbs away on the left passing the Panel Signal Box by the entrance to the Exeter TMD where local Great Western Railway DMUs are maintained. The old South Devon Railway main line, crosses the River Exe and a parallel flood relief channel, and then passes above the suburbs of Exeter along a stone viaduct on which is situated Exeter St Thomas railway station. On the left a short line went down to the Exeter Canal at City Basin; on the right a longer branch ran to Heathfield on the Newton Abbot to Moretonhampstead branch.

The line crosses marshes as it runs alongside the canal and river, passing the site of Exminster railway station, with a George Hennet station house on the right. A square pond to the left of the line is the site of Turf engine house. This stretch of the line used to have long water troughs between the rails from which steam locomotives could refill their water tanks without stopping.

From Powderham Castle, the railway is right alongside the river; on the right of the line is the castle's deer park, while on the left, across the river, trains on the Avocet Line run near Lympstone Commando. The line now enters Starcross railway station, beyond which is the pier for the Exmouth to Starcross Ferry and, on the right, the old Starcross engine house. A little further along the river the railway crosses the mouth of Cockwood harbour. Near the shipwreck here on the left was the 1,285 feet (392 m) long Exe Bight Pier, in use from 1869 for about ten years. The railway line opens out into four lines at Dawlish Warren railway station, where the platforms are alongside loop lines that allow fast trains to overtake stopping services.

The railway now comes onto the South Devon Railway sea wall which it shares with a footpath. Approaching Dawlish railway station, the Coastguard's Cottage was used by the railway during its construction and then sold to the coastguard; their boat house is below the footbridge. The footpath along the sea wall now ends and the line enters its first tunnel, the 265 yards (242 m) Kennaway Tunnel beneath Lea Mount, beyond which is Coryton beach and then 227 yards (208 m) Coryton tunnel. The next beach is the private Shell Cove and then the railway passes through 49 yards (45 m) Phillot Tunnel and 58 yards (53 m) Clerk's Tunnel, emerging onto a section of sea wall at Breeches Rock before diving into 513 yards (469 m) Parson's Tunnel beneath Hole Head. The last two tunnels are named after the Parson and Clerk Rocks, two stacks in the sea off Hole Head. When the tunnel was dug the workers cut into a smugglers tunnel which ran from a hidden entrance above the cliff down to a secluded cove. The sea wall is known for its maintenance problems, in particular, all services on the line were suspended after the line collapsed at Dawlish during storms on 5 February 2014, but the line reopened on 4 April 2014 after extensive reconstruction work.

Beyond Parson's Tunnel is a short viaduct across Smugglers Lane and then the footpath resumes alongside the line for the final stretch of the Sea Wall past Sprey Point to the cutting at Teignmouth Eastcliff. On the right side of the railway near Sprey Point can be seen the remains of a lime kiln used during the construction of the line.

The railway passes through to Teignmouth railway station, then continues through a cutting to emerge behind the busy Teignmouth Harbour, after which the railway resumes its course alongside the water, now the River Teign. The cuttings on both sides of the station were originally tunnels and were opened out between 1879 and 1884. The railway passes under the long Shaldon Bridge and then follows the river past the small promontories at Flow Point, Red Rock, and Summer House.

After leaving the riverside the line crosses Hackney Marshes and passes between the railway sidings at Hackney Yard (left), and the race course and former Moretonhampstead branch (right). The industrial area to the left of Newton Abbot railway station is the site of the South Devon Railway Company locomotive workshops — the older stone buildings are the only surviving railway buildings.

=== Newton Abbot to Plymouth ===
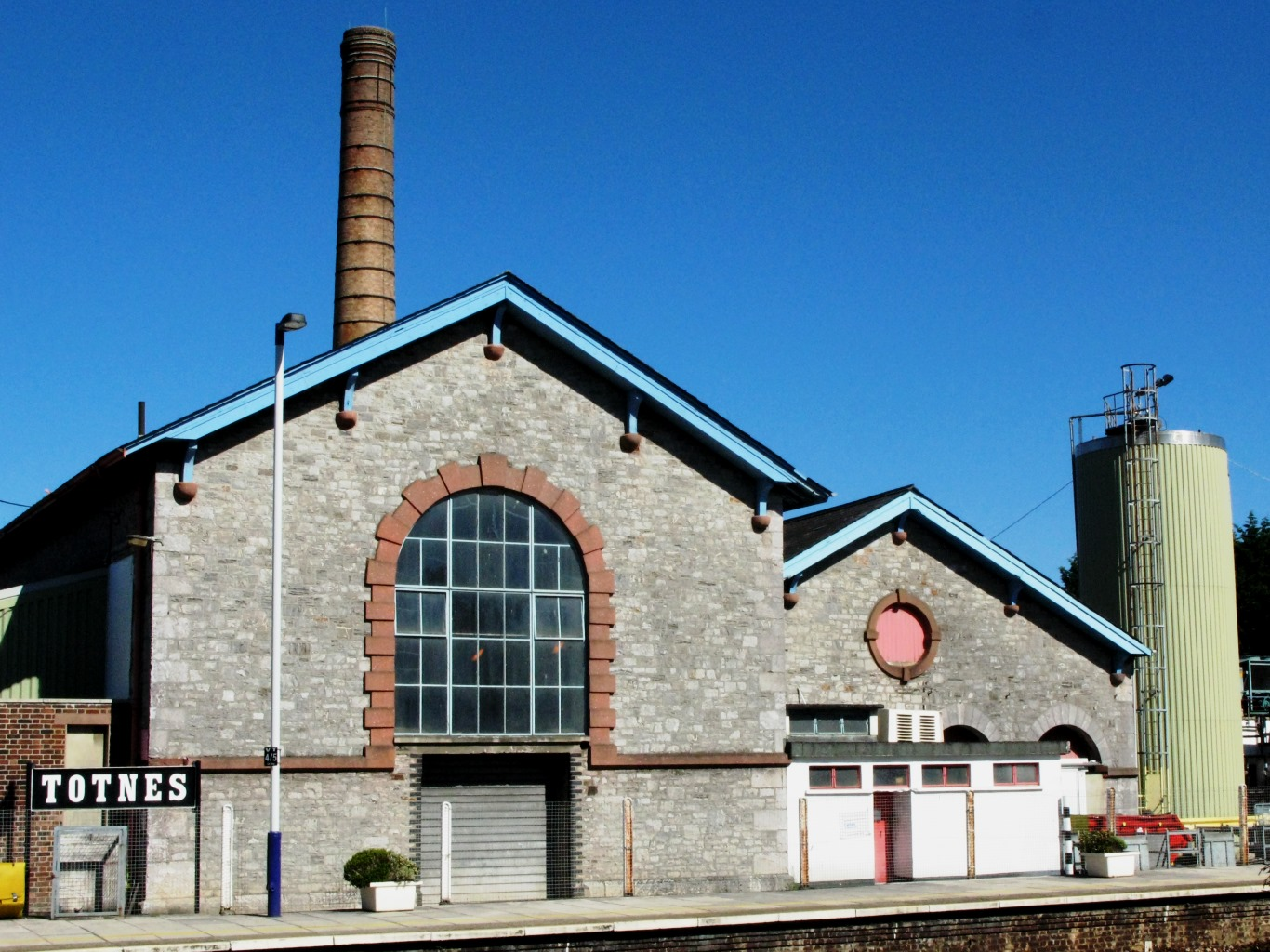
The old engine house at Totnes

Communities served: Newton Abbot – Totnes – Ivybridge – Plymouth.

Just outside Newton Abbot, a line branches off on the left but continues to run alongside the main line. This is the Riviera Line to Paignton and the two routes part company at Aller Junction when the main line curves to the right to start the climb up past Stoneycombe Quarry to Dainton Tunnel. The line from Exeter to Plymouth was designed by Isambard Kingdom Brunel as an atmospheric railway which allowed steeper gradients, sharper curves, and lighter structures. Atmospheric trains never ran beyond Newton Abbot yet the legacy of the aborted scheme means that line speeds on towards Plymouth are lower than elsewhere on the route.

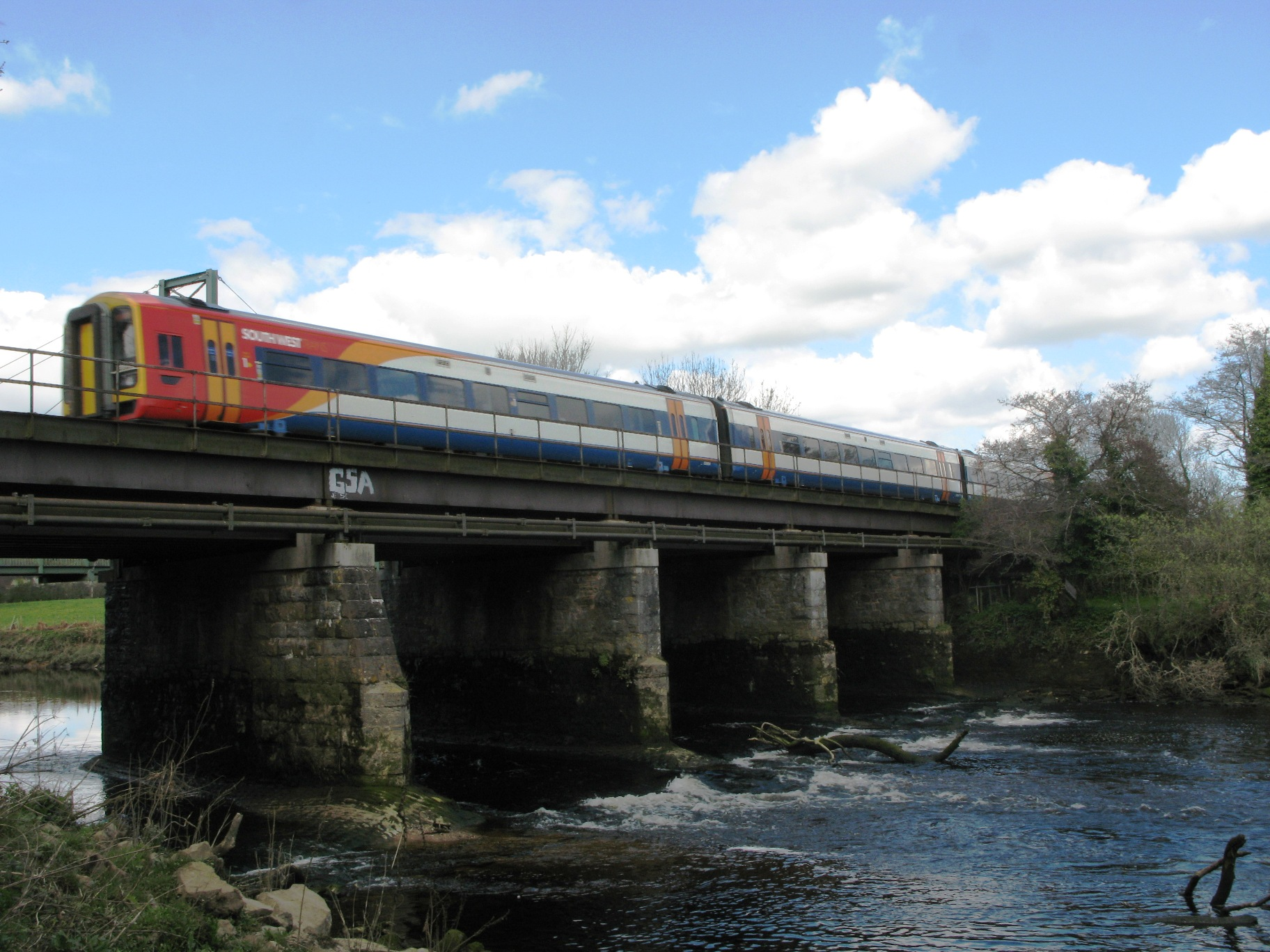
A South West Trains Class 159 diesel multiple unit crossing Totnes viaduct, with a service from London Waterloo to Plymouth. This franchise also operated to Paignton and Penzance; however, after the December 2009 timetable change, it no longer operated west of Exeter.

Once through Dainton Tunnel the line drops down past Littlehempston and shortly the South Devon Railway, a heritage railway, on the right. The line immediately crosses over the River Dart and arrives at Totnes, which has passing loops to allow slower trains to be overtaken. Behind the right-hand platform can be seen a dairy which is built around the old atmospheric engine house. The line then passes under the concurrent A385 and A381 roads carried on a steel girder bridge.

The steep climb up Rattery Bank starts right from the end of the platform, a stiff challenge in former days to trains that called at Totnes. At the top is Rattery Viaduct and the 869 yards (795 m) Marley Tunnel. The original single-track tunnel had a second bore added alongside it in 1893 when the line was doubled. The line is now running along the southern edge of Dartmoor. Brent railway station was once the junction for the Kingsbridge branch line which joined the route in the cutting just before the station. Curving to the left the line passes over the 57 yards (52 m) Brent Mill Viaduct and then the 163 yards (149 m) Glazebrook Viaduct.

After passing through the 47 yards (43 m) Wrangaton Tunnel the line passes through the remains of Wrangaton railway station; Monksmoor Siding on the right used to serve a naval stores depot. Just beyond the site of Bittaford Platform is the 132 yards (121 m) Bittaford Viaduct. The industrial buildings on the right were built as china clay dries where clay dug on Dartmoor was treated; the Redlake Tramway was built alongside the pipeline that carried the liquid clay.

The line now comes to Ivybridge railway station. The platforms here are staggered with the one on the left nearer Totnes than the one on the right. This is a modern station opened in 1994; the original station was closed in 1965 and was on the far side of the curving 229 yards (209 m) Ivybridge Viaduct where an old goods shed can be seen on the left. After the 309 yards (283 m) Blatchford Viaduct is the old Cornwood railway station where George Hennet's station house is on the right.

The 275 yards (251 m) Slade Viaduct brings rises to the top of Hemerdon Bank, the steepest climb for trains heading towards Newton Abbot. A fast run down the bank to the site of Plympton railway station, and then Tavistock Junction. The large goods yard here includes a maintenance shed for on-track equipment and a connection to the china clay drier at Marsh Mills. This is on the former South Devon and Tavistock Railway although the junction originally faced Plymouth.

The line swings left under the Marsh Mills Viaduct of the A38 road and then runs alongside the tidal estuary of the River Plym on the left, with the grounds of Saltram House at Plymstock on the far bank. Underneath the Embankment Road bridge which carries the A38 over the line again and Laira TMD on the left. Laira maintains Great Western Railway's High Speed Trains in Devon. A triangle of lines takes a freight route down to the Plymouth waterfront via the closed Plymouth Friary railway station, which was the terminus for trains on the competing route from London Waterloo station.

Passing through the short Mutley Tunnel, trains emerge past the former Mutley station site and former Royal Eye Infirmary into Plymouth railway station, which was originally known as North Road Station as trains continued beyond it to Plymouth Millbay.

== Current services ==
Most of services on the route are operated by Great Western Railway. These services include the high speed trains from London Paddington to Penzance, Plymouth or Paignton. Some of these services travel through Reading and Bristol Temple Meads, and join at Taunton, before continuing to Exeter on the Bristol to Exeter line. The operator also provides local services along the full length of the line.

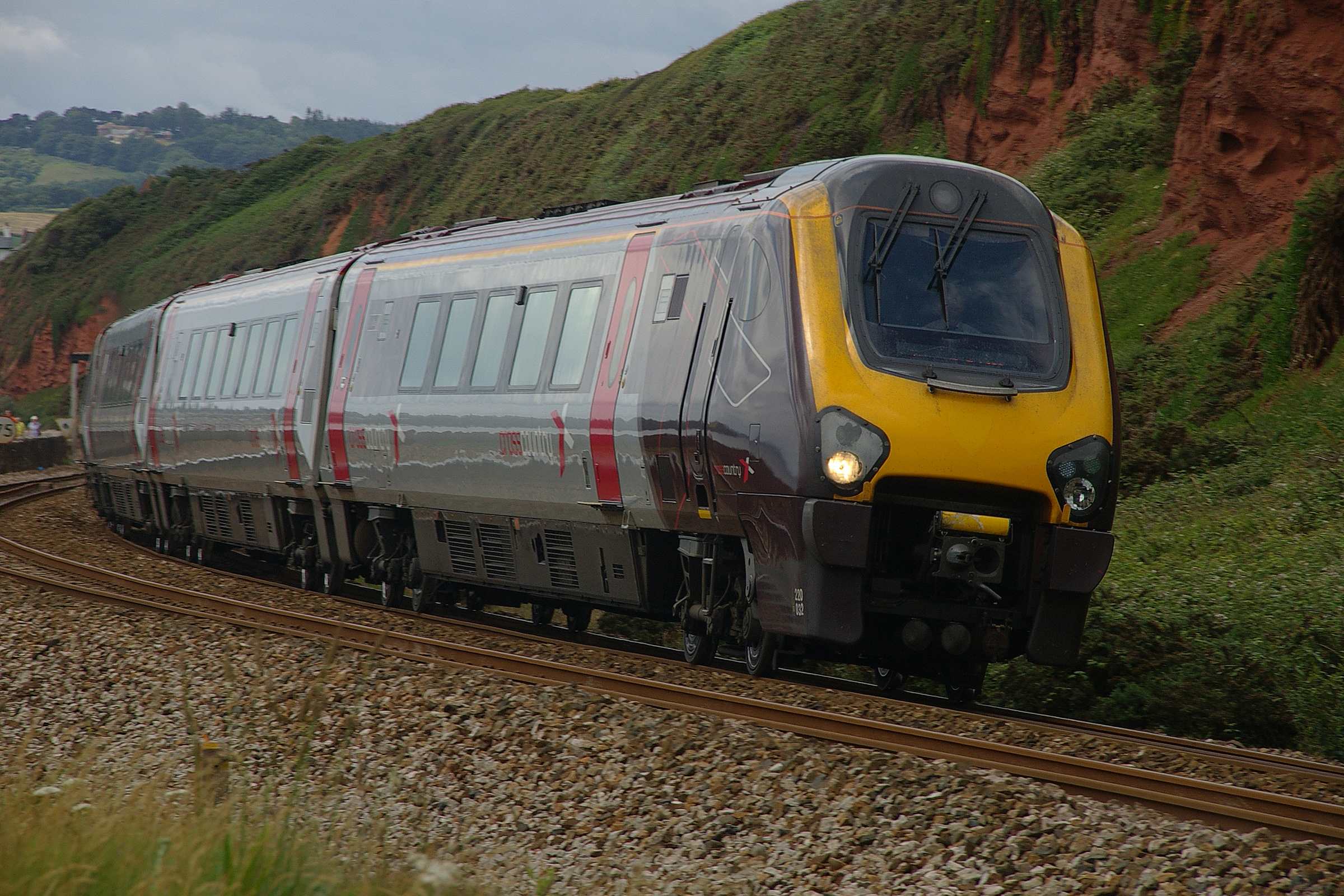
CrossCountry Class 220 Voyager unit 220032 on a curve at Langstone Rock near Dawlish

CrossCountry services operate along the entire line. These services travel north from Plymouth through Exeter, before continuing through Taunton and Bristol Temple Meads to either North East England and Scotland, or North West England; some continue westwards beyond Plymouth.

== Infrastructure ==
The route is double track throughout with passing loops at certain locations. The highest line-speed on the route is 100 mph (160 km/h). The route has a loading gauge clearance of W7, and is open to rolling stock up to Route Availability 8. Signalling requires four minutes between trains on most of the route, but six minutes west of Newton Abbot. Signalling is by multiple-aspect signals, controlled from panel signal boxes at Exeter and Plymouth. Most of the signals are three-aspect, but some sections of two- or four-aspect signalling also exist.

== Accidents ==
There has been a number of serious accidents on the line over the years. Some of the notable ones are:

- Dawlish – collision, 22 September 1921.
- Sea Wall – landslip, 16 February 1855 and various other dates including 5 February 2014. (See South Devon Railway sea wall for full list)
- Totnes – collision, 31 October 1853.
- Totnes – boiler explosion, 13 March 1860.
- Totnes – derailment, 5 April 1865.
- Rattery near Totnes – collision, 1 August 1853.
- Ivybridge – collision, 29 July 1862.
- Plympton – boiler explosion, 27 June 1849.
- Plympton – collision, 13 September 1866.
- Plymouth Millbay – buffer stop collision, 13 September 1866.

== See also ==
- Disused railway stations (Exeter to Plymouth Line)
- Exeter to Plymouth railway of the LSWR
