= Laira Halt railway station =

Former railway station in Plymouth, England

Laira Halt was a small railway station situated in the Laira district of Plymouth, Devon in England. It was situated close to Laira engine shed.

== History ==
The first station at Laira was a temporary terminus for the South Devon Railway which was in use from May 1848 until April 1849 when its permananet Plymouth terminus was opened at Plymouth Millbay. Laira Halt was opened by the Great Western Railway on 1 June 1904 on a new site a little west of the previous station. It was later renamed Laira Halt. The station was not particularly successful and was closed from 7 July 1930.

== Reopening proposals ==
In May 2026, Luke Pollard, MP for Plymouth Sutton and Devonport, suggested that the station should reopen to provide faster connections within the city of Plymouth and reduce congestion. It is suggested that the station could be built and operational by 2028. Great Western Railway and Plymouth City Council have expressed interest in the proposals, as well as railway campaign group Railfuture.

The station is an extension of the wider Plymouth Metro plans, to improve connections across Plymouth.

== Bibliography ==
- Gregory, R.H. (1982). The South Devon Railway. Oakwood Press. ISBN 0-85361-286-2.
- Oakley, Mike (2007). Devon railway stations. The Dovecote Press. ISBN 978-1-904-34955-6.
- Quick, Michael (2023). Railway Passenger Stations in Great Britain: A Chronology (PDF) (5th ed.). London: Railway and Canal Historical Society.
- Reed, Brian (1975). Diesel-Hydraulic Locomotives of the Western Region. Newton Abbot: David and Charles. ISBN 0-7153-6769-2.
- Smith, Martin (1995). An Illustrated History of Plymouth's Railways. Caernarfon: Irwell Press. ISBN 1871608414.
