= Plympton railway station =

Disused railway station in Devon, England

Plympton
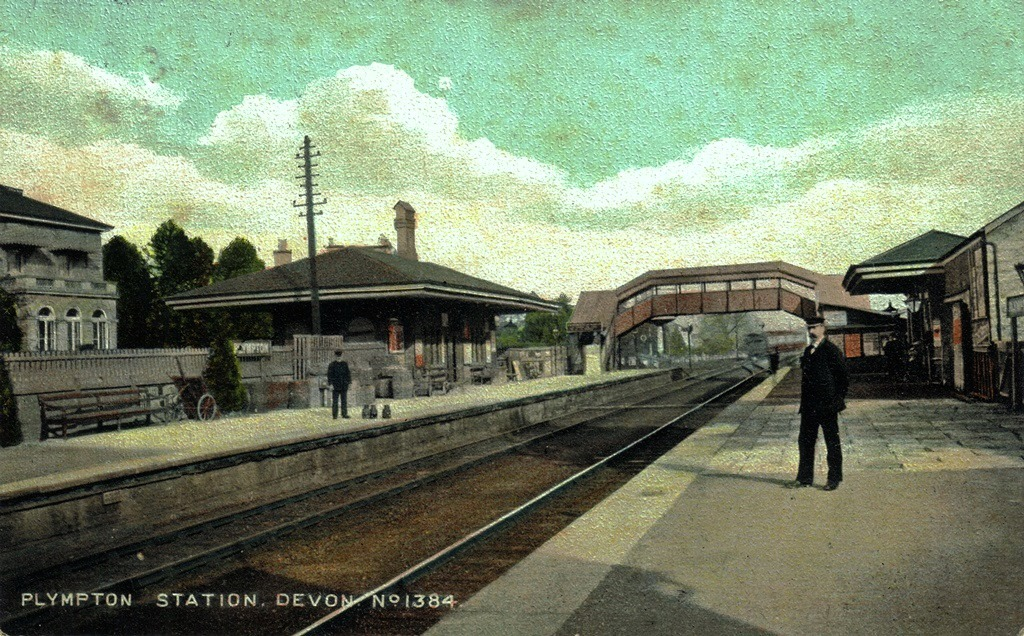
- Postcard of Plympton station c.1900

General information
- Location: Plympton, Plymouth; England
- Platforms: 2

Other information
- Status: Disused

History
- Original company: South Devon Railway
- Pre-grouping: Great Western Railway
- Post-grouping: Great Western Railway

Key dates
- 15 June 1848: Opened
- 2 March 1959: Closed to passengers
- 1 June 1964: Closed to goods

Plympton railway station was a former railway station located at Plympton in Devon on the South Devon Main Line between Exeter and Plymouth. Plympton was a town in its own right when the railway was constructed but is today an eastern suburb of the city of Plymouth.

== History ==
Railway facilities in Plympton had originally been provided by the horse-drawn Plymouth and Dartmoor Railway, but their branch to Plympton was closed and sold to the South Devon Railway to allow the construction of their new line. The new station was not ready to be opened with the railway, but was brought into use six weeks later on 15 June 1848. Westwards the line ran into Plymouth Millbay railway station from 1849. In 1871 an intermediate station was opened at Mutley. From 1859 the South Devon and Tavistock Railway opened a new branch northwards from Plymouth to Tavistock and beyond. In 1865 a new station Marsh Mills was opened close to Plympton on this branch.

From 1 June 1904 Plympton was the eastern terminus for enhanced Plymouth area suburban services, which saw steam railmotors used to fight competition from electric trams. An additional station Laira Halt was opened between Plympton and Mutley until its closure in 1930. Mutley then shut in 1939. From 1941 Plymouth Millbay was closed to passengers following an air raid and Plymouth railway station became the main central destination in the city and remained the next station on the line westwards.

The station closed to passengers on 2 March 1959 but goods traffic continued to be handled until 1 June 1964. The station was demolished after closure and there are now no remains of the station.

== Proposed reopening ==
A Plymouth Joint plan that was opened for consultation in 2018 included a suggested 'Plymouth Metro' with a station at Plympton. The proposal to open a Plympton station, in conjunction with an electric "Devon Metro" transit system for Plymouth is mentioned in the South West Devon joint Local Plan, P45 Section 3.60, a plan that was adopted in 2019 and received cross-party support. Discussion continued as of 2023, with no formal plan adopted.

== Bibliography ==
- Tait, Derek. Plymouth From Old Photographs. Amberley Publishing Limited, 2011.

Preceding station	Historical railways	Following station
Laira Halt {station closed)	Great Western Railway; Exeter–Plymouth line	Cornwood (station closed}
