= Cornwood railway station =

Disused railway station in Devon, England

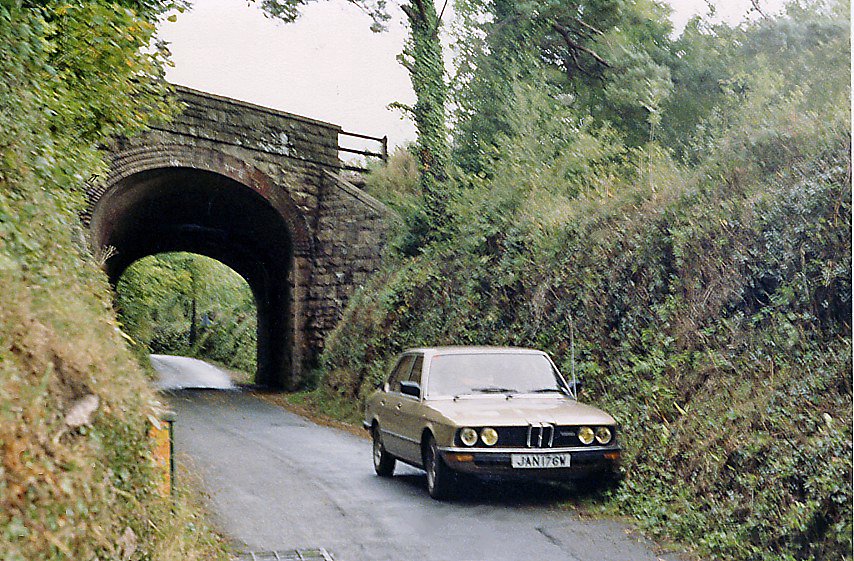
- Site of former station in 1984

General information
- Location: Cornwood, South Hams; England
- Platforms: 2

Other information
- Status: Disused

History
- Original company: South Devon Railway
- Pre-grouping: Great Western Railway
- Post-grouping: Great Western Railway

Key dates
- 1852: Opened
- 2 March 1959: Closed

Cornwood railway station was a former railway station located in the village of Cornwood in Devon on the South Devon Main Line between Exeter and Plymouth.

It was constructed a few years after the opening of the stretch of line. The station was built at Cornwood by George Hennet. It was opened in 1852 and operated by him on behalf of the South Devon Railway until January 1857 when the railway company took over. Until 1864 it was known as "Cornwood Road".

An Italianate building on the north side of the single track housed a booking office and waiting room on the ground floor, with accommodation above for the station master. It was situated in a cutting in the 1/2 mile (0.80 km) between Blatchford and Slade viaducts. The line was doubled from Hemerdon to Cornwood on 16 May 1893 and a signal box was opened at the east end of the station. The double line was extended to Blatchford viaduct on 19 November 1893. This doubling required the construction of a new platform for westbound (down) trains. The station closed for passenger trains on 2 March 1959. A loop line was provided to the east of the platform for up trains which was closed on 26 February 1962; the signal box was kept in use until 26 February 1963.

The London bound platform and station building can still be seen from passing trains.

== Bibliography ==
- Gregory, Roy. The South Devon Railway. Oakwood Press, 1982.
- Jenkins, Stanley C. & Loader, Martin. The Great Western Railway Volume Two Bristol to Plymouth. Amberley Publishing, 2014.
- MacDermot, Edward Terence. History of the Great Western Railway, Volume 2. I. Allan, 1964.

Preceding station	Historical railways	Following station
Plympton (station closed)	Great Western Railway; Exeter–Plymouth line	Ivybridge (station moved to new site)
