= George Hennet =

English railway engineer (1799–1857)

- Born: 24 May 1799; York, England
- Died: 20 April 1857 (aged 57); London
- Occupation: Railway engineer

George Hennet (1799–1857) was an English railway engineer and contractor. He undertook many contracts for Isambard Kingdom Brunel's broad gauge railways in the South West of England and funded the provision of extra facilities on the South Devon Railway, these formed the basis of a general trading business that he conducted.

== Domestic life ==
George Hennet was born on 24 May 1799 in York. He studied at Boston, Lincolnshire and became an assistant school master at his grammar school when aged 16.

He married Rosamond Follet in 1829, daughter of a timber merchant from Topsham, Devon. They had a daughter, Rosamond, in about 1833, and a son, Follett Charles, in 1835.

During his work for Brunel he had an address in Duke Street, close to Brunel's London offices, but the 1831 census recorded him in Russell Square. After living in Bristol near Temple Meads station for a while, in about 1849 he moved to Teignmouth in Devon from where he could better manage his contracts with the South Devon Railway and took an active part in the life of the town.

He was declared bankrupt in 1853, owing about £350,000. His trading business continued for some years but his railway maintenance contract was cancelled and he had to sell much of his property in Dawlish and Teignmouth. He died in London following a heart attack on 20 April 1857.

== Railways ==
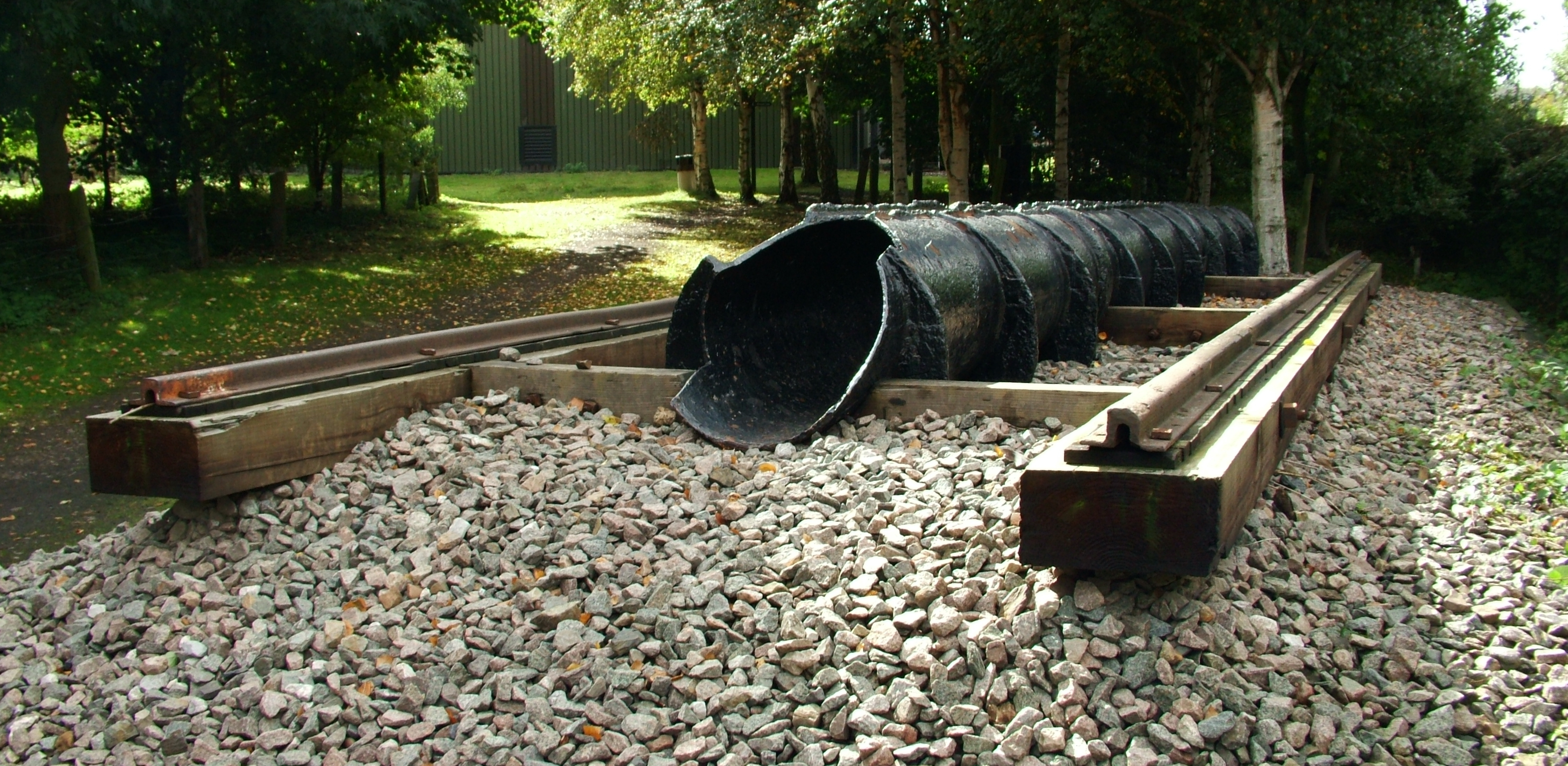
George Hennet supplied the atmospheric traction pipes to the South Devon railway, then brought them back for scrap when the system was removed.

He was employed to make a survey for a map of Lancashire in 1827. This led to him being employed by George Stephenson, Robert Stephenson, and Isambard Kingdom Brunel as a surveyor on railway lines they were building including the Great Western Railway. This put him in a position to work on other lines for Brunel including the Cheltenham and Great Western Union Railway, Bristol and Exeter Railway, South Devon, Bristol and Gloucester Railway, South Wales Railway, Berks and Hants Railway, Oxford and Rugby Railway, and Birmingham and Oxford Junction Railway.

Hennet was a contractor for engineering work, mostly laying track, on 13 different railways in Britain and France. He also worked on Brunel's Clifton Suspension Bridge. Brunel engaged Hennet in 1844 to lay the track on the South Devon Railway which was under construction. Hennet supplied all the timber but the rails were provided by another contractor for Hennet to lay. He was additionally contracted by the railway to construct a bridge across the River Exe outside Exeter St Davids railway station.

Further contracts were won for supplying and laying the pipes necessary for the novel atmospheric traction system that the South Devon Railway had chosen over conventional steam locomotives. This contract was awarded even though Hennet did not own a foundry at the time but he soon bought one in Bridgwater. He started to make 13-inch (33 cm) diameter pipes in 1845 but Brunel changed the specification and they were never used, larger pipes being made instead. The track contract had earned Hennet £173,976 and with the atmospheric pipes contract and other work he was paid nearly £400,000, about 20% of the railway's capital, and Hennet was able to buy back many of the atmospheric pipes for scrap once they were made redundant by its premature abandonment.

He was awarded a five-year maintenance contract for the railway which started on 27 July 1849 and was worth £5,700 per year. As well as keeping the track in good repair, this included maintaining the stations, policing the line, and clearing snow. In 1851 he won a new contract for laying a second track near Totnes. The contract was terminated early because of Hennet's bankruptcy in 1853. The staff who had worked for him on this contract were reemployed by the railway company who then undertook their own engineering.

== Bridgwater Foundry ==
After he won the contract to supply the atmospheric pipes he bought a recently established ironworks at Bridgwater in Somerset to undertake the work. It was situated next to the carriage workshops of the Bristol and Exeter Railway. This location allowed the import by boat of raw materials from Wales by sea and the dispatch of finished work to south Devon by rail.

The works passed to his son, Follet Charles Hennet. The ownership changed several times so it traded as Hennet, Spink & Else or Hennet & Spink and from 1873 as the Bridgwater Engineering Company but this failed in 1878. It built railway wagons for several businesses such as collieries and coal merchants who needed their own wagons to run on various railways. It undertook some signalling work for the West Somerset Railway and the Devon and Somerset Railway, built three bridges over the River Thames and made some lighthouse including one at Watchet.

== Teignmouth Old Quay ==
The South Devon Railway laid a siding onto the Old Quay at Teignmouth in 1849. This was close to the railway a short distance west of the station. In 1850 the quay's owner died. The railway company considered buying it but railway's chairman encouraged Hennet to buy it instead, which he did in March 1851. Hennet extended the quay and built a shed on it to store timber. He also laid more railway sidings and the connection with the main line was improved to make it easier to move wagons on and off the quay.

Teignmouth was part of the Port of Exeter where customs dues were collected and fees paid to the city. Hennet build a bonded warehouse at Teignmouth which allowed it to become a port in its own right from 6 January 1853. £3,000 was paid to Exeter as compensation.

He owned three ships, the Harriet (which was too large to dock at Teignmouth), Devonport, Mary and Henrietta. He also provided a steam tug for Teignmouth Harbour which was named Industry. When his property was sold after his death, it included 'an iron yacht, 2 barges and 3 boats' along with the Mary and the Henrietta.

On the north coast of Devon he also owned a dock at Fremington along with three lime kilns, a stable and stores. They were connected to the North Devon Railway.

== South Devon Railway depots ==
Exminster station in 2020

Hennet's contracts with the South Devon Railway (SDR) enabled him to build up a fleet of railway wagons with the Old Quay at Teignmouth becoming the centre of a network of goods depots. Following the failure of the atmospheric system, the South Devon Railway was short of money so Hennet agreed that he rent land alongside the line and build goods depots. These were both for his own trade and also for general traffic handled by the railway. The first depots were approved in March 1851 at Totnes and Rattery, along with additional sidings connecting to the Old Quay. The SDR then allowed him to open a quarry and lime kilns on the north side of the railway at Stoneycombe near Newton Abbot in April. A Mr Stone of Taunton opened another quarry on the south side at the same time. Brent was added to the list in July with Exeter St Davids, Exeter St Thomas and Starcross in August. The depot at Dawlish also opened at around this time but the exact date of this is uncertain.

September saw additional agreements made for depots at Cornwood in August and Exminster in September. These were different in that the SDR only agreed to them provided Hennet also built passenger stations and staffed them. The two passenger stations opened in August 1852. Hemerdon siding was also approved in September. The final addition to the network was a siding at Eastcliff on the sea wall in Teignmouth in 1852.

The principal traffic that Hennet envisaged was coal which was shipped into Teignmouth and then distributed as far as Plymouth, Exeter, Crediton and probably Cullompton, the last two being beyond Exeter on other railway lines. The limekilns at Stoneycombe and Eastcliffe generated agricultural lime but anything that could be shipped by train was carried including timber and iron. 20,099 tons were moved in and out of Teignmouth in 1852 which was some 26% of the SDR's total goods traffic.

Hennet's bankruptcy in 1853 made little difference to these operations, but they were now supervised by a solicitor in Teignmouth. Hennet owned about 140 wagons and offered to sell them to the SDR but they only took 20 at the time. Renewed efforts to sell his assets in January 1857 resulted in the SDR buying another 49 wagons along with the two stations and most of the depots. The remaining wagons and depots were disposed of at the same time to other traders who continued to operate them for many years.
