= Ivybridge railway station =

Railway station in Devon, England

Ivybridge
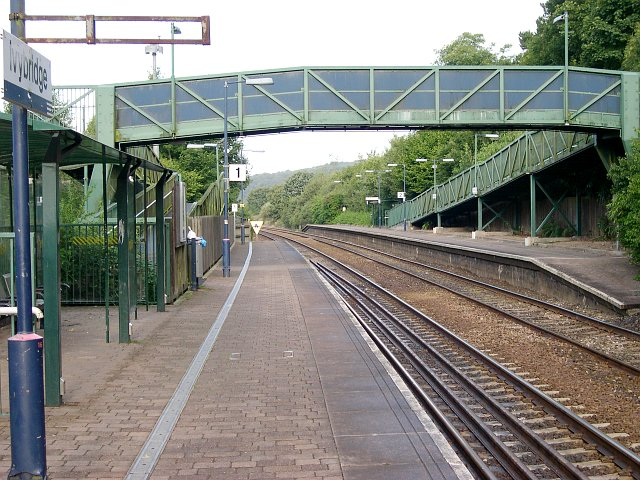
- Looking westwards

General information
- Location: Ivybridge, South Hams; England
- Coordinates: 50.394°N 3.905°W
- Grid reference: SX647565
- Manager: Great Western Railway
- Platforms: 2

Other information
- Station code: IVY
- Classification: DfT category F2

History
- Original company: British Rail

Key dates
- First station opened: 15 June 1848
- First station closed: 29 November 1965
- Current station opened: 15 July 1994

Passengers
- 2021/22: ▲66,764
- 2022/23: ▲0.101 million
- 2023/24: ▲0.118 million
- 2024/25: ▲0.137 million
- 2025/26: ▲0.155 million
Location
Notes
- Passenger statistics from the Office of Rail and Road

Ivybridge railway station is situated on the Exeter to Plymouth line and serves the town of Ivybridge in Devon, England. It is 234 miles 27 chains (234.34 mi; 377.1 km) down the line from the zero point at London Paddington, measured via Box.

== History ==
=== First station ===
Ivybridge's first station was located at 50.3957°N 3.9225°W. It was not complete when the South Devon Railway was opened, but was brought into use just six weeks later on 15 June 1848. The building was situated on the north side of the track, immediately to the west of Ivybridge Viaduct. Passenger trains were withdrawn on 2 March 1959 but goods traffic continued until 29 November 1965.

Preceding station	Historical railways	Following station
Cornwood (station closed)	Great Western Railway; Exeter–Plymouth line	Bittaford Platform (station closed)

=== Current station ===
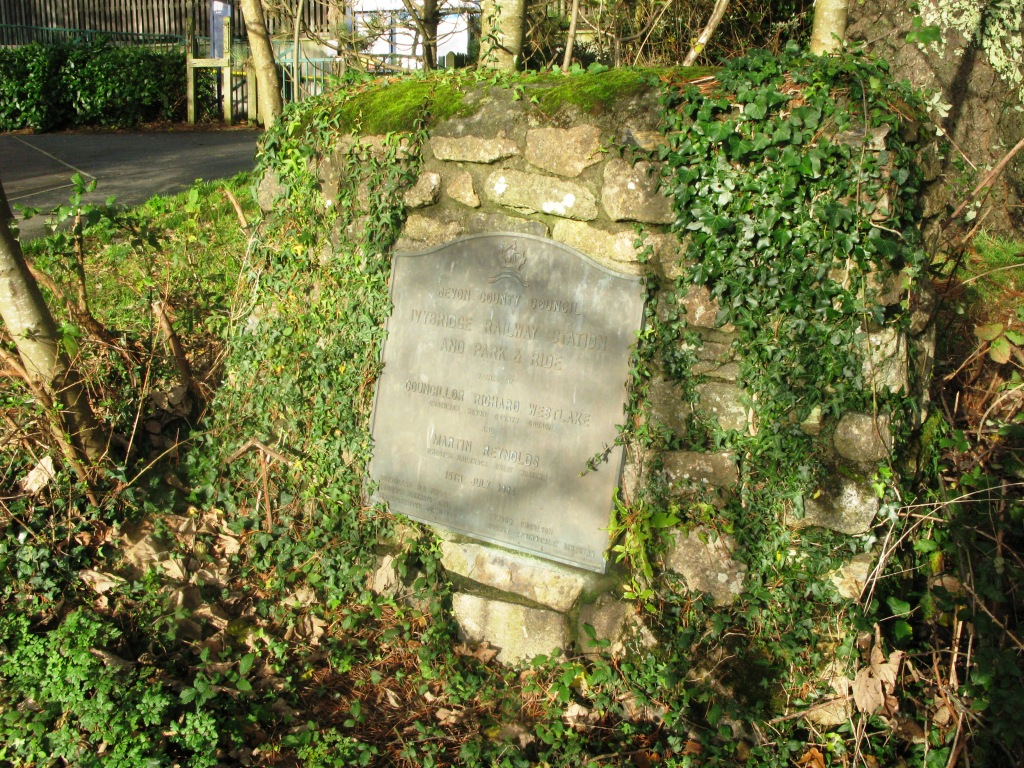
A plaque commemorating the opening, mounted on a granite boulder near the entrance

A new station costing £380,000 was opened east of the viaduct on 15 July 1994 by British Rail under the Regional Railways sector. To fit in the narrow site, the platforms are staggered, with the eastbound platform nearer to Plymouth than the westbound. It was marketed as a Park and Ride station with a large 100-space car park to entice car drivers off the A38 road into Plymouth, but the level of train service has never offered the convenient and frequent service that is normally associated with such facilities.

== Services ==
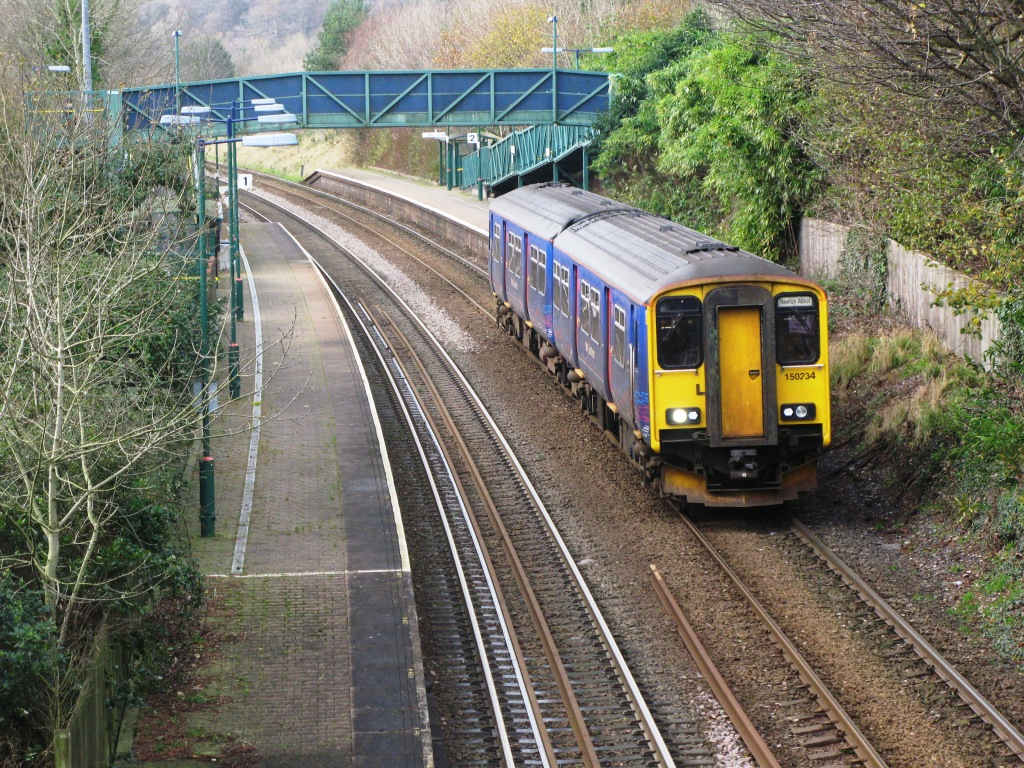
A Plymouth to Newton Abbot service

=== Current services ===
Great Western Railway provides a frequent but irregular service pattern on two inter-city routes:

- London Paddington to Penzance, via Reading and Plymouth
- Cardiff Central to Penzance, via Bristol Temple Meads and Plymouth.

There are also occasional services to Gloucester and Westbury.

Travel times to Plymouth are typically 15 minutes and around 50 minutes to reach Exeter.

Preceding station	National Rail	Following station
Totnes	Great Western Railway; Exeter to Plymouth Line	Plymouth

=== Former services ===
An early timetable shows just two of the ten trains to Plymouth arriving there before 09:00 and the last return train leaving at 21:11. The afternoon service was gradually reduced until by September 1999 only 7 trains ran to Plymouth and 9 return. From 20 May 2001, a through service from London Waterloo station was introduced by South West Trains, which resulted in 11 trains each way.

When First Great Western proposed their new Winter 2006 service, there were many complaints as it would have seen a drastic reduction in trains calling at Ivybridge. After considering the position, a total of 9 trains were scheduled by the two companies but with just one train arriving in Plymouth before 09:00.
