= South Devon Banks =

Series of steep railway inclines in Devon, England

The South Devon Banks are a series of steep inclines on the ex-GWR railway line linking Exeter and Plymouth in Devon, England. These two cities are separated by the rocky uplands of Dartmoor forcing the early railway surveyors to propose that the line skirt the difficult terrain of the comparatively sparsely populated moorland. Isambard Kingdom Brunel, in surveying the South Devon Railway, opted to push a line along a coastal strip between the Exe and Teign valleys, and then to climb the southern outliers of Dartmoor making for the head of the Plym estuary. From Newton Abbot, the line climbs Dainton Bank, and from Totnes it climbs Rattery Bank, reaches a peak at Wrangaton summit, and then descends Hemerdon Bank to reach Plymouth. These three are collectively known as the South Devon Banks.

== Dainton Bank ==
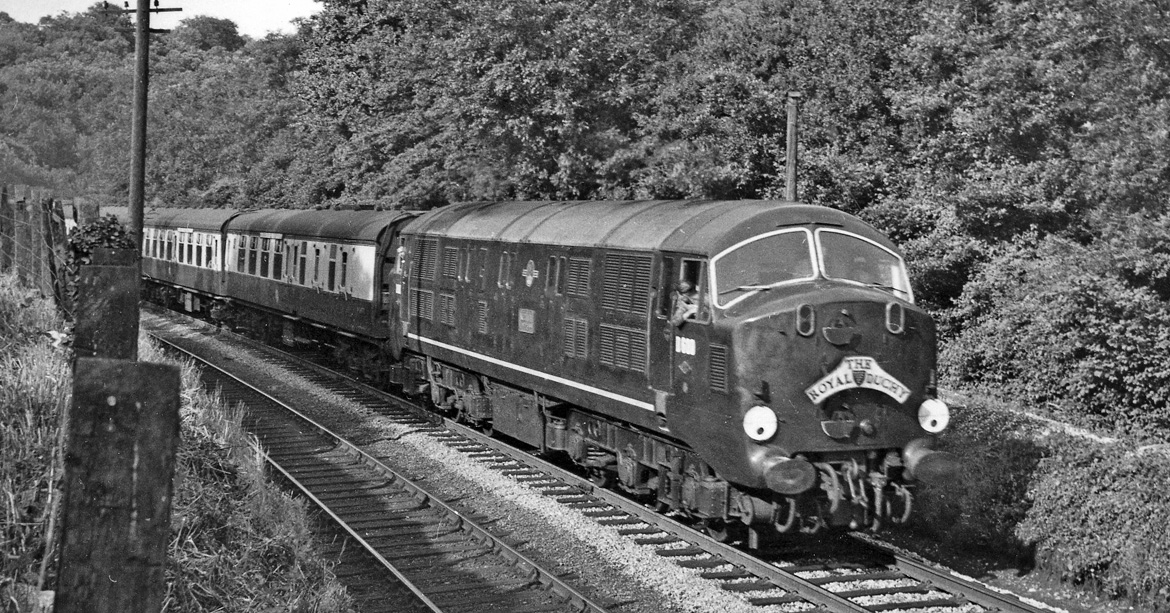
D600 Active, the first of the early Warship class in 1958, approaches Dainton Bank with the Down Royal Duchy to Plymouth

The third steepest main line bank on the British mainland, with 2 miles varying between 1 in 36 and 1 in 57. Leaving Newton Abbot station, the line is near level until Aller Junction, where the line to Torbay diverges to the left. The climb proper begins at Stoneycombe, where there was a signal box and quarry siding, and continues through Dainton tunnel to Dainton signal box, a distance of 2 miles and 17 chains (3.56 km).

== Rattery Bank ==
The seventh steepest main line bank on the British mainland, with a constant 4 1/4 miles (6.8 km) initially between 1 in 45 and 1 in 70 before easing to 1 in 90 and then increasing to 1 in 65. Leaving Totnes station, the line immediately climbs past the site of Tigley signal box and on to the site of Rattery signal box, a distance on 4 miles and 50 chains (7.44 km).

== Hemerdon Bank ==
The fourth steepest main line bank on the British mainland, with a constant 1 in 42 for 2 1/2 miles. The climb begins at Plympton and climbs all the way to Hemerdon signal box, a distance of 2 miles and 50 chains (4.22 km).

== Effects on operations ==
From an early date, trains were constrained in weight, and therefore in length, by the need to climb the steep gradients of South Devon. Express trains were further constrained by the need to achieve fast times between Exeter and Plymouth. In broad gauge times trains changed engines at Newton Abbot with 4-4-0 saddle tanks of the South Devon Railway and later 2-4-0 saddle tanks of the GWR hauling trains over the steep gradients to Plymouth. This practice continued after the change to standard gauge, with Dean 4-2-2's handing over to 4-4-0 Duke class engines for the climbs, and later Bulldog 4-4-0s taking over from the Atbaras with their 6-foot-8-inch (2,030 mm) driving wheels. The only exception to this policy was in 1902 and 1903, when Atbara and City class engines hauled lightly loaded royal specials throughout.

The inaugural Cornish Riviera Limited built on the royal specials of the previous two years by running through to Plymouth with a City class engine; the train being limited to 6 coaches. However, greater demand for seats meant that by 1911, despite the introduction of the 4-6-0 Saint class, a pilot engine was required. In this process a pilot engine, usually placed behind the train engine per standard GWR practice and therefore requiring an awkward shunting manoeuvre, would be added at Newton Abbot on down trains, and both engines haul the train through to Plymouth where it was usual to change engines before entering Cornwall. In the up direction, the change of engines at Plymouth would see two engines take over the train, the inside engine being removed during the stop at Newton Abbot. From their introduction, the King class had a monopoly on the fastest workings through Devon, but it was still usual to add a pilot for heavy loads; Castle, Hall and Grange classes were common, and even a double-headed King could be encountered.

The advent of the NBL 2000 hp diesels in 1958 spelled the end of regular double-heading; these were a match for the steam timetable on their own. The later Warships, and then Westerns were also capable, and faster times over the gradients became possible. With the move from Diesel-Hydraulic to Diesel-Electric, Classes 45, 46, 47 and 50 took over; the only train being booked for a pilot in the early 1980s being the Paddington to Penzance sleeper which was booked, in the Down direction only, to have a class 31 added for the run to Plymouth.

With the advent of the HST, the power-to-weight ratio of 4,500 hp (3.4 MW) to 374 long tons (380 t) meant that there was no difficulty in keeping to time. However, operating instructions dictated that an HST running with only one operational power car should be piloted over the South Devon Banks. As the drawbar on the HSTs was behind the lower front panel, the procedure required to attach an additional locomotive to the front was quite time-consuming. Similarly the desire to make up time had to be tempered by the limitation on maximum speed due to the additional locomotive. Classes 46, 47 and 50 have been recorded assisting HSTs in this manner, and running up to 100 mph (160 km/h) along the Exe Estuary between Exeter and Dawlish Warren was not unheard of; the engine was typically attached at Exeter as there was usually a locomotive available at the stabling point. There was little need for this procedure in the up direction as a spare power car was normally available at Laira, even if it had to be turned on the triangle at Laira Junction/Mount Gould Junction/Lipson Junction first.

In more recent times, HSTs have been permitted to run through unassisted on one operational power car only, however normal practice is to omit the Totnes stop in order to achieve a run at the incline (Rattery Bank in the westbound direction or Dainton Bank in the eastbound direction). Much of the reason for this change in policy is the relative non-availability of standby diesel locomotives on the modern railway, where minimal freight traffic operates in the south west of England.

== Test track ==
Many tests and comparisons carried out by the GWR and BR(WR) have involved traversing the South Devon Banks. During the locomotive exchanges of 1948, Paddington to Plymouth turns were worked by LMS Coronation Class 4-6-2 43236 City of Bradford, LMS Royal Scot 4-6-0 46162 Queen's Westminster Rifleman, ER A4 4-6-2s 60022 Mallard and 60033 Seagull and SR Merchant Navy 4-6-2 35019 French Line CGT, and Bristol to Plymouth turns were worked by LMS Black Five 4-6-0 45253, ER B1 4-6-0 61251 Oliver Bury and SR West Country 4-6-2 34006 Bude. These turns all included a dynamometer car on one or more runs.

In June 1950, Brown-Boveri designed Gas Turbine No. 18000 carried out a series of test runs with a dynamometer car, starting from Plymouth and climbing Hemerdon bank. During these tests, the locomotive failed to restart a 350-long-ton (360 t) train from a standing start on the bank itself, and achieved a speed of 10 mph (16 km/h) on cresting the bank with a 400-long-ton (410 t) load, having been travelling at 50 mph (80 km/h) past Plympton before starting the climb. The Metropolitan Vickers Gas Turbine No. 18100 also carried out a series of test runs in 1951 including climbing all of the South Devon Banks. Performance up Dainton and Rattery was deemed satisfactory, but four subsequent test runs were carried out ascending Hemerdon bank. One was aborted, but in the other three 18100 hauled 14, 17 and 18 coaches respectively, the latter exceeding 600 long tons (610 t) and achieving a minimum of 15 mph (24 km/h) on the bank when recorded as passing Plympton signal box at 40 mph (64 km/h).
