= Disused railway stations on the Exeter to Plymouth Line =

Disused stations on the main line in Devon, England

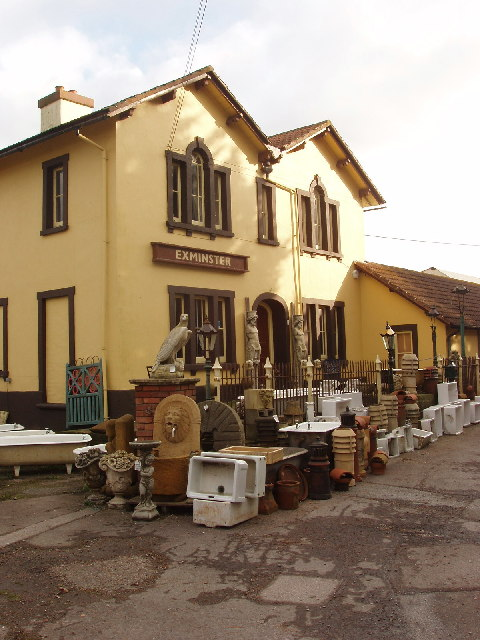
Exminster station is now an architectural salvage depot.

There are eleven disused railway stations on the Exeter to Plymouth line between Exeter St Davids and Plymouth Millbay, in Devon, England. Eight of these still have visible remains today.

== Background ==
The South Devon Railway was opened in stages between 30 May 1846 and 2 April 1849. It was originally designed to operate on the atmospheric principle, but this was not successful and was never completed beyond Newton Abbot. It was amalgamated into the Great Western Railway on 1 February 1876 and now forms part of the Exeter to Plymouth Line.

Ivybridge station which closed in 1959, was replaced by another station on a different site in 1994. The disused stations at Exminster, Brent and Plympton have been suggested for reopening.

== Stations ==
=== Exminster ===
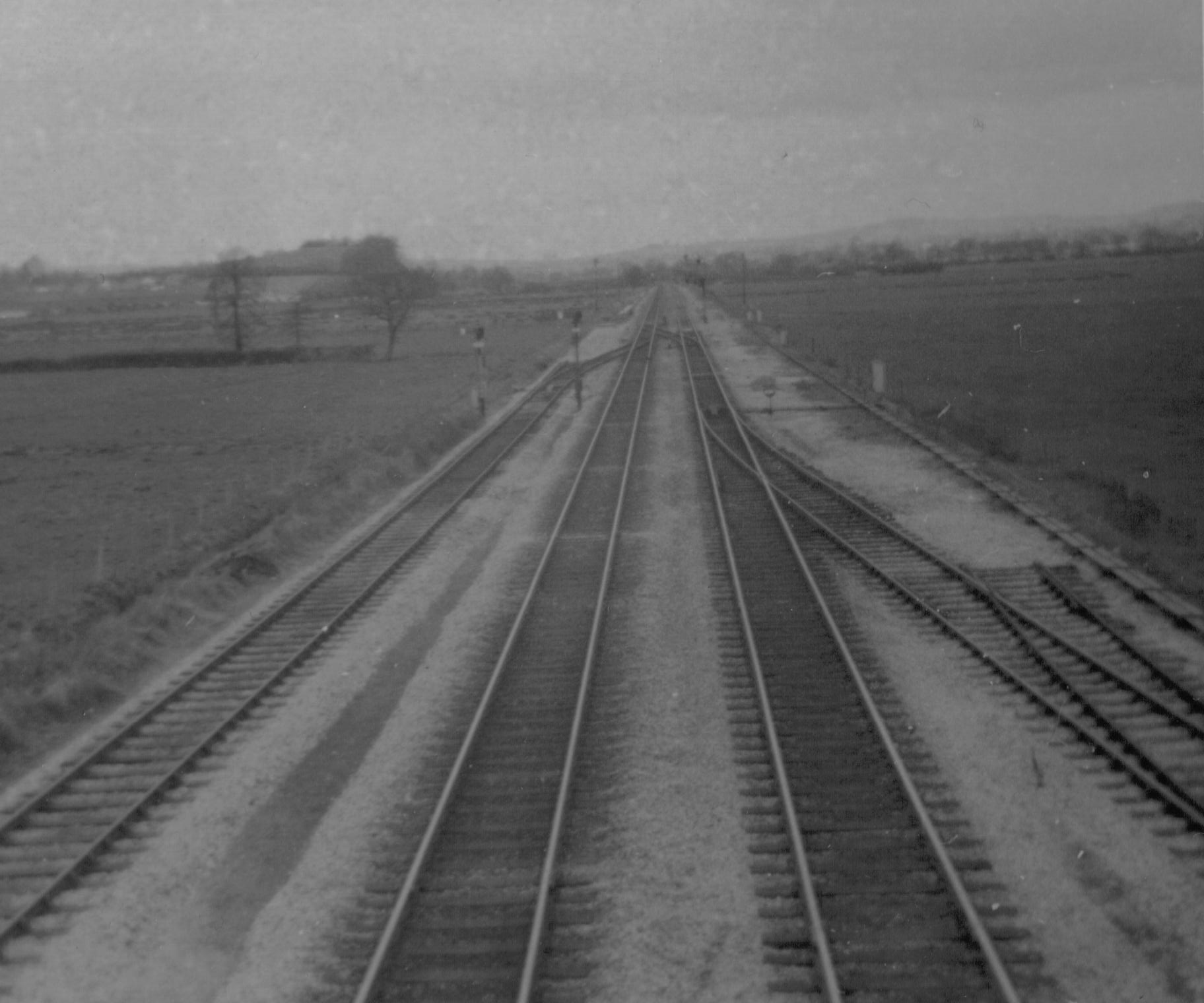
The station looking north towards Exeter St Davids (1970)

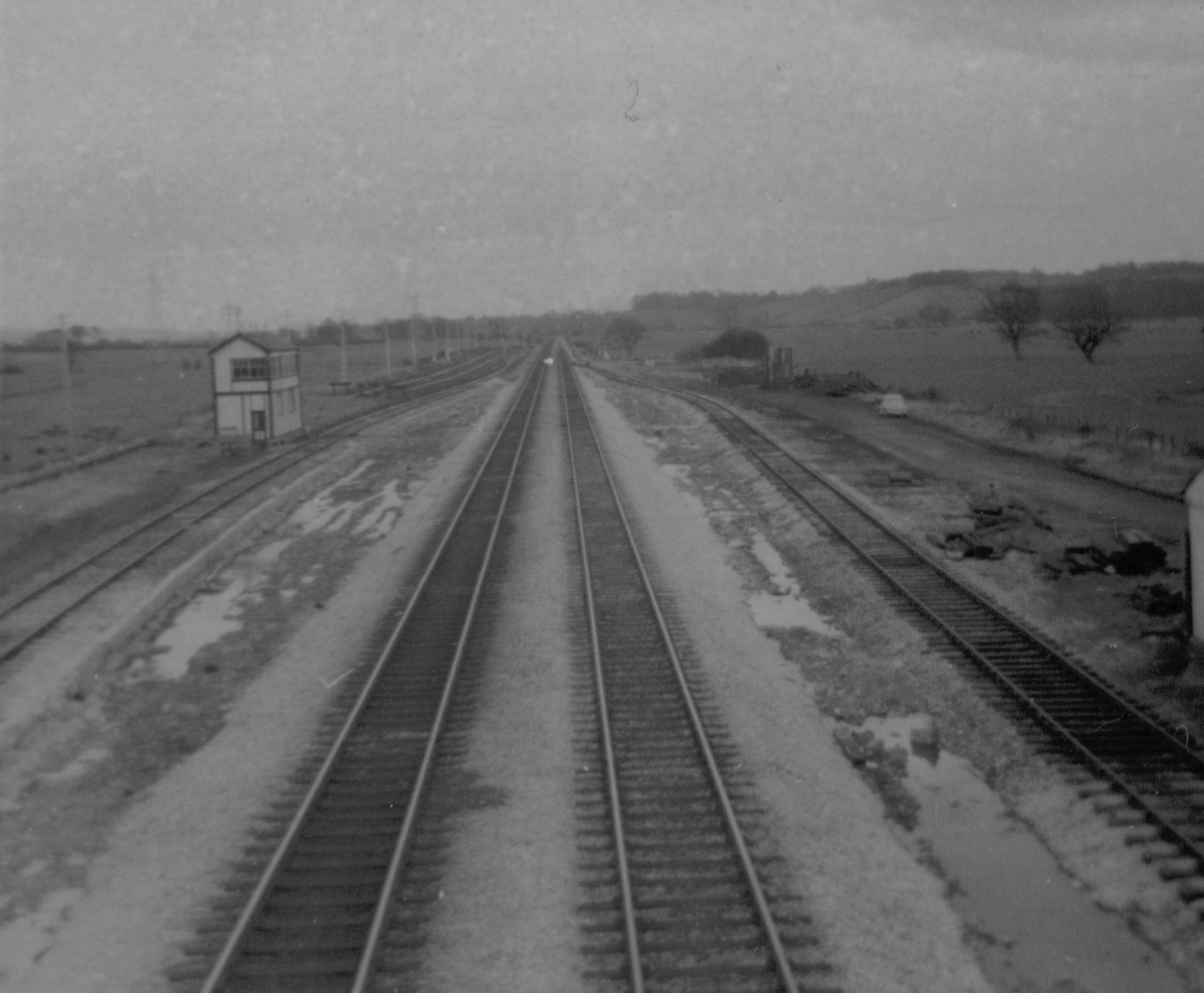
Exminster in 1970, looking south towards Starcross

Located at 50.6753°N 3.4828°W

A station was built at Exminster by George Hennet. It was opened in August 1852 and operated by him on behalf of the South Devon Railway until January 1857, when the railway company took over. An Italianate building on the west side of the single track housed a booking office and waiting room on the ground floor, with accommodation above for the station master. Hennet also operated a goods siding and coal shed at the station.

The line through Exminster was doubled in November 1859 and so a second platform for southbound (down) trains was built; passengers used the road bridge to cross to it. The siding was extended to provide a refuge for up trains in 1894 and a down refuge siding was constructed north of the bridge in 1906; these allowed slow goods trains to be overtaken.

In 1924, the facilities were greatly enlarged. A new passenger loop was laid behind the southbound platform, so down stopping passenger trains could be now overtaken while in the station. This meant that the road bridge had to be extended across the loop line, with a second span. A new signal box was provided at this time. In 1931, an up platform loop was squeezed into the space between the station building and the platform, and the bridge extended again. A new booking office was provided on the approach to the bridge. In 1940, the down refuge siding was converted into a loop, so that goods trains could run straight in without reversing; three loop sidings were provided behind the platform. These were originally intended to help the flow of goods traffic during the Second World War, but later became a useful place to stable empty passenger trains on busy summer Saturdays.

The station closed for passenger traffic on 30 March 1964 and for goods on 4 December 1967, although only coal traffic had been handled for the previous 27 months. The refuge sidings had already been removed by then and the loop sidings behind the down platform converted to dead-ends. They continued to see occasional use until 1985. The signal box was closed on 14 November 1986 and was used by bird watchers for a while, before being dismantled for reuse at Broadway on the Gloucestershire Warwickshire Railway The 1852 station building still survives.

A ten-year strategy, published by the local council in November 2017, included a proposal that Exminster could reopen but, in April 2020, a decision was made to prioritise a new station nearby at Marsh Barton instead. Lack of track capacity meant that it was "almost impossible" to open both.

=== Brent ===
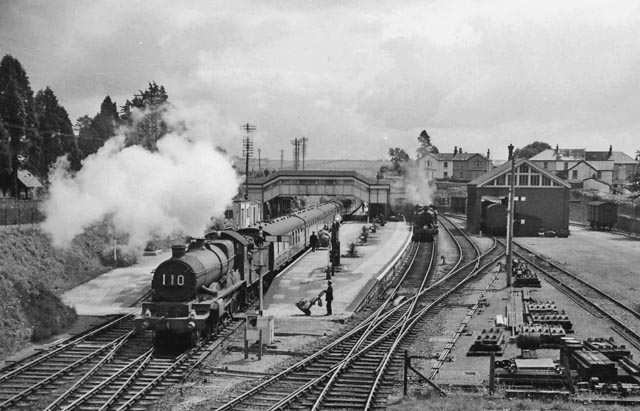
Brent station in 1958

Located at 50.4280°N 3.8345°W

Brent railway station served the village of South Brent, on the southern edge of Dartmoor. It was not ready when the railway was opened, but was brought into use six weeks later on 15 June 1848. On 19 December 1893, the station became a junction, with the opening of the Kingsbridge Branch Line. The branch line closed on 16 September 1963 and there was little reason for the station after that. Goods traffic was withdrawn on 6 April 1964 and to passengers on 5 October 1964. The signal box was retained until 17 December 1973, when control of the line was transferred to the power signal box at Plymouth.

The former goods shed on the westbound (Plymouth) side is still intact. The signal box was demolished in November 2014.

=== Wrangaton ===
Located at 50.4044°N 3.8545°W

The station at Wrangaton was opened with the line on 5 May 1848. At the time, it was the only intermediate station between Totnes and the temporary terminus at Laira. From 1849 to 1893, the station was known as Kingsbridge Road, becoming Wrangaton once more when the Kingsbridge branch line opened.

The station was closed to passengers on 2 March 1959, but goods traffic continued to be handled until 9 September 1963. Part of the platform is still visible, just west of Wrangaton Tunnel, as are the former Admiralty sidings on the north side of the line.

The signal box is now preserved as an exhibit at Kidderminster Railway Museum, adjacent to the Severn Valley Railway in Worcestershire.

=== Bittaford Platform ===
Located at 50.3977°N 3.8766°W

An unstaffed station was opened by the Great Western Railway at Bittaford on 18 November 1907 and closed on 2 March 1959. It was situated immediately east of Bittaford Viaduct. There are no visible remains of the platform.

There were no goods facilities, but Redlake siding was opened 3/4 mile (1.2 km) to the west on 10 September 1911. This siding served a large china clay drier which processed clay brought by pipeline from Redlake on Dartmoor; the eight-mile (13 km) long, 3 ft (914 mm) gauge Redlake Tramway was used to carry materials between Redlake siding and the clay pits.

=== Ivybridge ===
Located at 50.3958°N 3.9224°W

The station at Ivybridge was not complete when the railway was opened, but was brought into use six weeks later on 15 June 1848. The building was situated on the north side of the track, immediately to the west of Ivybridge Viaduct. The line originally had just a single track, but was doubled to the west on 11 June 1893 and from the far side of the viaduct to the east on 13 August 1893. A new stone viaduct to replace Isambard Kingdom Brunel's timber structure was brought into use in 1894 and allow the joining up of the double-track sections. This was on a new alignment which forced the construction of a new westbound (down) platform further back from the old line. The up platform was widened and this left the building set back at an odd angle to the track.

The goods shed at the station was replaced on 1 October 1911 by a new facility further west, which still survives in commercial use. In 1968, this was altered for shipping china clay brought from workings on Dartmoor by lorry. A signal box was situated on the south side of the line between the station and the goods yard from 1895 until 1973. The goods station closed on 2 November 1965, although passenger traffic had ceased from 2 March 1959. A replacement Ivybridge railway station was opened a mile away on the far side of the viaduct on 15 July 1994. The goods shed is still standing and used by a non-railway business.

=== Cornwood ===
Located at 50.4078°N 3.9672°W

A station was built at Cornwood by George Hennet. It was opened in 1852 and operated by him on behalf of the South Devon Railway until January 1857, when the railway company took over. Until April 1864, it was known as Cornwood Road.

An Italianate building on the north side of the single track housed a booking office and waiting room on the ground floor, with accommodation above for the station master. The line was doubled from Hemerdon to Cornwood on 14 May 1893 and a signal box was opened at the east end of the station, replacing an earlier one at the west end. This doubling required the construction of a new platform for westbound (down) trains. The double line was extended eastward to Blatchford viaduct on 19 November 1893 and a loop line was provided to the east of the platform for up trains.

It was closed on 2 March 1959, but the station building can still be seen from passing trains. The up loop was retained until 26 February 1962 and the signal box until 26 February 1963.

=== Plympton ===
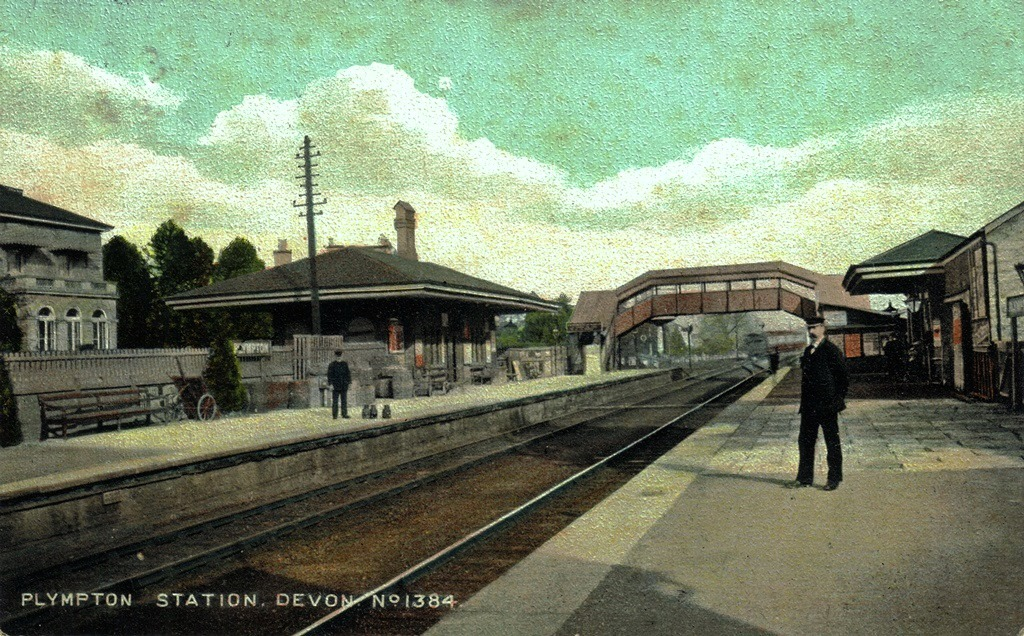
Plympton station

Located at 50.3911°N 4.0576°W

Railway facilities in Plympton had been provided originally by the horse-drawn Plymouth and Dartmoor Railway, but their branch to the suburb was closed and sold to the South Devon Railway to allow the construction of their new line. The new station was not ready to be opened with the railway, but was brought into use six weeks later on 15 June 1848.

From 1 June 1904, it was the eastern terminus for enhanced Plymouth area suburban services, which saw steam railmotors used to fight competition from electric trams. The station closed to passengers on 2 March 1959, but goods traffic continued to be handled until 1 June 1964.

A Plymouth Joint Plan, that opened for consultation in 2018, included a suggested Plymouth Metro with a station at Plympton.

=== Laira ===
Located at 50.3828°N 4.1008°W

A temporary terminus was opened at Laira, on the outskirts of Plymouth on 5 May 1848, while work continued on Mutley Tunnel and the final stretch of the line to Millbay. The Plymouth and Dartmoor Railway crossed the new South Devon Railway on the same level, just east of the station. Wooden buildings were provided for both passengers and goods traffic. Access was from the turnpike road (now known as Embankment Road) and a horse-drawn bus conveyed passengers to and from the town. The station was closed, when the line to Millbay was opened on 3 April 1849.

=== Laira Halt ===
Located at 50.3822°N 4.1066°W

A new facility, known as Laira Halt was opened by the Great Western Railway on 1 June 1904. It was on a new site, west of that used by the temporary terminus but adjacent to the new Laira engine shed. It had two 261 ft (80 m) wooden platforms, with iron shelters. This, along with several other small stations, formed a scheme to introduce a suburban train service in competition with electric trams. Laira Halt was not particularly successful and was closed from 7 July 1930.

=== Lipson Vale Halt ===
Located at 50.3826°N 4.1260°W

Another of the small stations opened by the Great Western Railway on 1 June 1904 was Lipson Vale Halt. It was situated on the east side of Mutley Tunnel between Laira Halt and the older station at Mutley. The platforms were built from wood but shortened in 1933; a shelter was provided on the westbound platform. The station closed on 22 March 1942.

=== Mutley ===
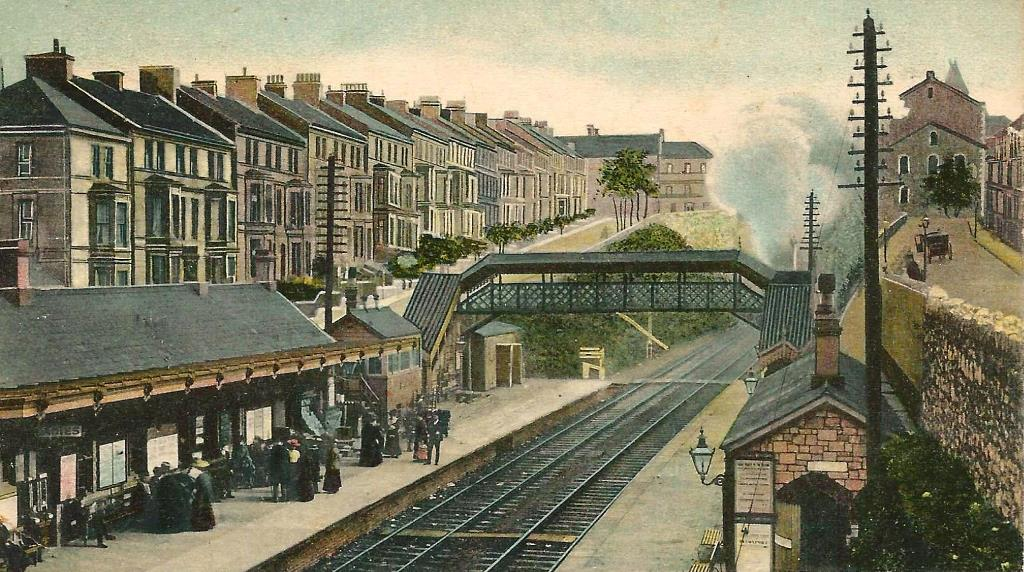
Mutley station, looking towards Exeter

Located at 50.3807°N 4.1373°W

The second permanent station in Plymouth was opened on 1 August 1871, to the west of the tunnel beneath Mutley Plain. It became a joint station used also by the London and South Western Railway's (LSWR) trains when they arrived in the area, by running over the railway from Tavistock, which they did from 18 May 1876.

A new joint North Road railway station was built in 1877, just a few yards to the west of Mutley, and this became the main station for the city. The LSWR's trains to Plymouth ran on a new line via Devonport from 2 June 1890. From 1 July 1891, they called at Mutley again, when their new terminus at Plymouth Friary was opened, but now they ran in the opposite direction to before. Trains from Friary to Exeter St Davids stopped on the westbound platform, those from Millbay to Exeter St Davids stopping on the eastbound.

Mutley was closed from 3 July 1939, to allow for track alterations in association with the rebuilding of North Road station.

=== Plymouth Millbay ===
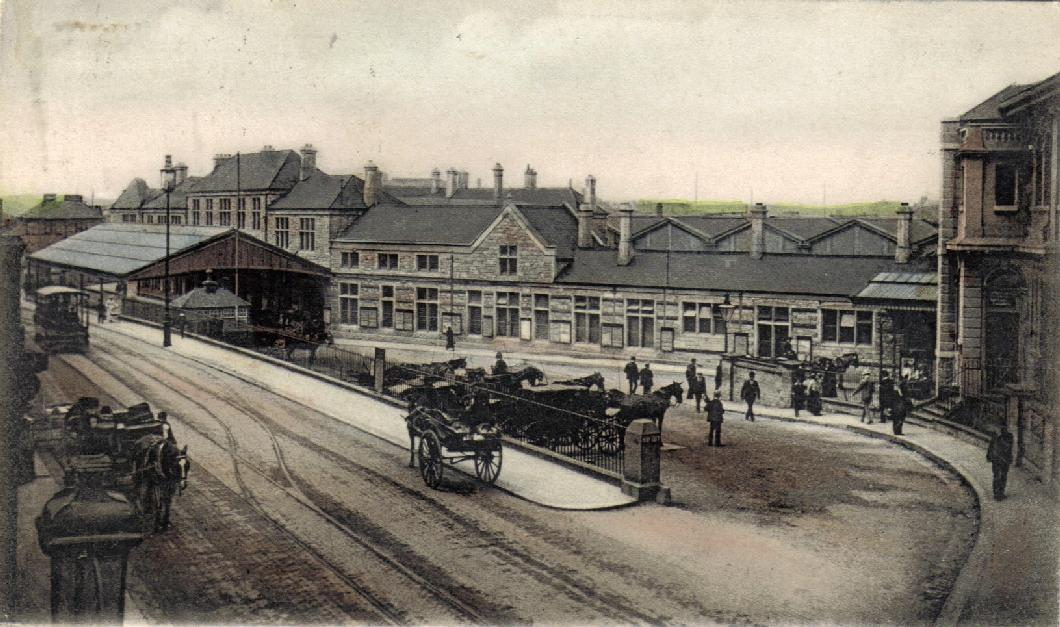
Millbay in the early 20th century

Located at 50.3681°N 4.1501°W

The trains of the South Devon Railway finally reached the town of Plymouth on 2 April 1849. Docks were opened adjacent to the station and a new headquarters office was built next door. The station was expanded ready for the opening of the Cornwall Railway on 4 May 1859 and the South Devon and Tavistock Railway on 22 June 1859. Initially known as just Plymouth, it became Plymouth Millbay after other stations were opened in the town in 1876–7 at Mutley and North Road.

The station was closed to passengers on 23 April 1941, after bombs destroyed the nearby goods depot; the passenger station being used thereafter only for goods traffic and access to the carriage sheds. All traffic ceased from 14 December 1969, except for goods trains running through to the docks which continued until 30 June 1971.

The site is now occupied by the Plymouth Pavilions leisure complex. Two granite gate posts outside the Millbay Road entrance are all that is left of the station.

== See also ==
- Disused railway stations (Bristol to Exeter Line)
- Disused railway stations (Cornish Main Line)
- Disused railway stations (Riviera Line)
- South Devon Railway engine houses
