= South Devon Railway Company =

Early railway in south-west England

South Devon Railway
Overview
- Headquarters: Plymouth
- Locale: England
- Dates of operation: 1846–1876
- Successor: Great Western Railway

Technical
- Track gauge: 7 ft 1/4 in (2,140 mm)
- Length: 52.85 mi (85.05 km) excluding branches

The South Devon Railway Company built and operated the railway from Exeter to Plymouth and Torquay in Devon, England. It was a 7 ft 1/4 in (2,140 mm) broad gauge railway built by Isambard Kingdom Brunel.

The line had to traverse difficult hilly terrain, and the company adopted the atmospheric system in which trains were drawn by a piston in a tube laid between the rails, a vacuum being created by stationary engines. The revolutionary system proved to have insuperable technical difficulties and was abandoned. The line continued as a conventional locomotive railway. The company promoted a number of branches, through the medium of nominally independent companies.

Its original main line between Exeter and Plymouth remains in use today as an important part of the main line between London and Plymouth.

== Chronology ==
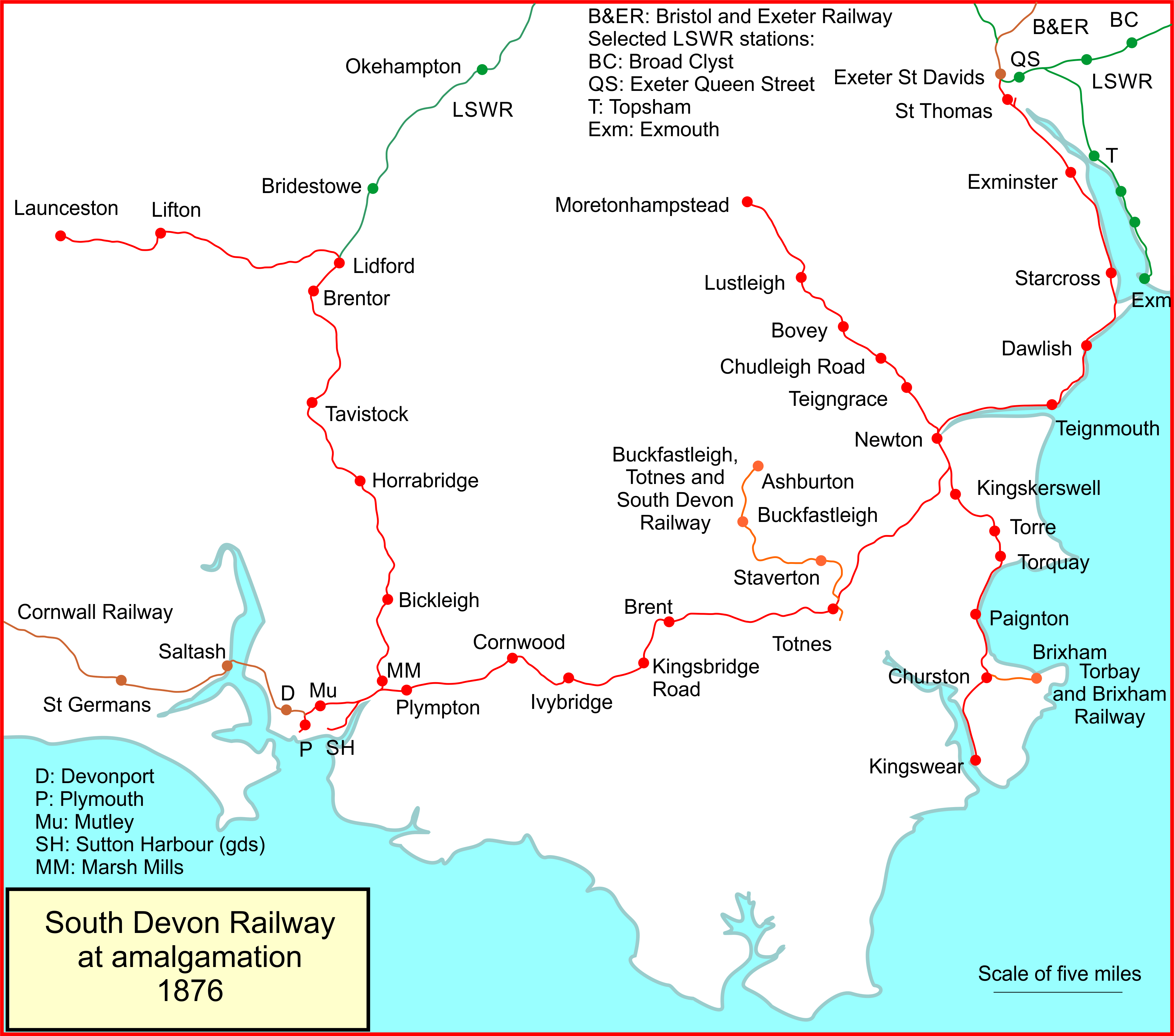
Map of the South Devon Railway system in 1876

- 1844 South Devon Railway Act 1844 (7 & 8 Vict. c. lxviii) passed by Parliament
- 1846 opened from Exeter to Teignmouth (May) and subsequently to Newton Abbot (December)
- 1847 opened to Totnes (July); atmospheric trains start running between Exeter and Teignmouth (September)
- 1848 atmospheric trains extended to Newton Abbot (January); main line extended from Totnes to Laira (May); atmospheric services withdrawn (September); Torquay branch opened as far as Torre (December)
- 1849 line completed to Plymouth
- 1853 Sutton Harbour branch opened
- 1859 South Devon and Tavistock Railway opened to Tavistock (June); Dartmouth and Torbay Railway opened from Torre to Paignton (August)
- 1861 Dartmouth and Torbay Railway extended to Churston
- 1864 Dartmouth and Torbay Railway extended to Kingswear
- 1865 South Devon and Tavistock Railway absorbed by SDR; Launceston and South Devon Railway opened from Tavistock to Launceston
- 1866 Moretonhampstead and South Devon Railway opened
- 1867 Exeter City Basin branch opened, for goods only
- 1872 Dartmouth and Torbay Railway absorbed by SDR; Moretonhampstead and South Devon Railway absorbed by SDR; Buckfastleigh, Totnes and South Devon Railway opened from Totnes to Ashburton
- 1873 Buckfastleigh, Totnes and South Devon Railway opened to Totnes Quay, for goods only (November); Launceston and South Devon Railway absorbed by SDR (December)
- 1876 SDR amalgamated with the Great Western Railway
- 1897 Buckfastleigh, Totnes and South Devon Railway absorbed by GWR

== Origins ==
=== First proposals ===
First thoughts of a railway connecting Plymouth to Exeter were discussed from 1826, but the first definite proposal came when a meeting of potential promoters in 1840 resolved to build a direct route between the cities. They chose the direct route over two suggested longer routes, which were similar to the Teignmouth and Okehampton routes that were actually built later. Their preferred line was to be 37 miles (60 km) long, climbing to 1,190 feet (363 m) and would pass through very sparsely inhabited terrain; there were to be three rope-worked inclines and two long tunnels, and the construction cost was to be £770,781. This ambitious scheme was presented to Parliament as a bill on 29 February 1840, but got no further there. Its supporters continued to argue in its favour, but the more practical scheme via Newton soon gained favour.

The failure of this scheme did not suppress the enthusiasm in Plymouth for a railway, and this was heightened as the Bristol and Exeter Railway (B&ER) was constructing its broad gauge line. The Great Western Railway (GWR) and the B&ER were working in close harmony, and were known as the Associated Companies, forming a powerful broad gauge interest in railways. Supporters of what soon became the Plymouth, Devonport and Exeter Railway Company saw that financial support might be available from the Associated Companies, and so it proved, subject to substantial capital (£500,000) being raised locally as well, and that any chosen alignment in Plymouth would be suitable for later extension into Cornwall.

The choice of terminal in Plymouth was a fine point, for the "Three Towns" of Plymouth, Devonport and Stonehouse were independent and fiercely jealous of one another. With Isambard Kingdom Brunel now advising the promoters, a terminal at a neutral location at Eldad was selected. Located away from the centre of any of the Three Towns, it was mocked as being "No Place"; a public house of that name at 353 North Road West on Eldad Hill was extant until 2010, and Gregory speculates that it was built in anticipation of the South Devon's Eldad terminus. (Note: It was converted in 2010 to student accommodation; a letting agency advertisement at http://www.studylets.co.uk/property.jsp?h=357&y=7 in January 2014 claimed: "The No Place Inn: The third oldest pub in Plymouth it was converted to high quality student accommodation in 2010. The building is not one of those cookie cutter student houses but has a unique character and was awarded Grade A by the University.")

South Devon Railway Act 1844
- Act of Parliament
- Parliament of the United Kingdom
- Long title: An Act for making a Railway from Exeter to Plymouth, to be called "The South Devon Railway."
- Citation: 7 & 8 Vict. c. lxviii

Dates
- Royal assent: 4 July 1844

A prospectus was issued proposing the line, which with some detail changes, was similar to that actually operating today; the B&ER station at Exeter (St Davids) would be used, and the western terminal would be Eldad, with a branch to the harbour at Millbay. The company's name was changed to the South Devon Railway and a parliamentary bill was submitted in the 1844 session; with little opposition, it obtained its authorising act of Parliament, the South Devon Railway Act 1844 (7 & 8 Vict. c. lxviii), on 4 July 1844. Share capital was to be £1,100,000 and the associated companies agree to subscribe, in the sums of:

- Great Western Railway: £150,000
- Bristol and Exeter Railway: £200,000
- Bristol and Gloucester Railway: £50,000.

=== The atmospheric system adopted ===
Although the route was to follow the coast from Exeter to Newton (later called Newton Abbot), from there to Plymouth it would need to run over difficult hilly terrain, and gradients and curvature were challenging. Brunel had planned the route as a double-track locomotive railway, and as late as May 1844 he stated, in reference to the atmospheric system, "I have not been called upon to recommend it or not".

However, Brunel was concerned about the efficiency of available steam locomotives, and he had been interested in the 1840 demonstration of the atmospheric system at Wormwood Scrubs. The system atmospheric railway briefly involves a pipe laid between the running rails, and stationary steam engines located at engine houses at intervals of a few miles along the line; they exhaust air from the pipe, forming a partial vacuum. A piston carriage is placed at the head of each train, and it carries a piston which travels in the tube. The tube is slotted at the top to enable the piston bracket to pass, and a continuous leather seal prevents unwanted admission of air. With a partial vacuum in the pipe ahead of the piston, the pressure of the atmosphere behind it drives it forward, drawing the train. The leather seal is opened by rollers immediately ahead of the bracket carrying the piston, and closed immediately behind it.

Jacob and Joseph Samuda had taken out a patent for the use of the atmospheric system on railways and operated the Wormwood Scrubbs demonstration; and from August 1843 trial runs had operated on the Dalkey Atmospheric Railway. The system appeared to be a solution to the difficulties: greater traction was possible, not relying on steel wheel adhesion, and avoiding the necessity to carry the weight of a locomotive and its fuel over the steep gradients. It was asserted that only a single line (instead of double track) would be needed to work the traffic by the atmospheric system, and that steeper gradients and sharper curves were feasible compared with locomotive operation, saving construction costs. In fact the capital outlay would be reduced by £67,000, allowing for the cost of construction of the pumping stations, and annual operating costs would be £8,000 cheaper.

The system was considered at a board meeting on 5 August 1844, and a few days later some of the directors visited Dalkey to assess the system in operation there. On 19 August the board resolved to adopt the system. Gregory records that:

"The Chairman [Thomas Gill] admitted that at first he thought it unwise to use it, believing that it was unsuited to the particular circumstances of this neighbourhood, but after witnessing what he did on the Dublin & Dalkey Railway his prejudices were entirely removed."

The directors' decision was put to the first shareholders' meeting on 28 August 1844. A shareholder pointed out that the Dalkey line was less than 2 miles (3 km) in length whereas the South Devon was 50 miles:

"Brunel replied that this had been carefully considered and had they not been satisfied that it could be applied as well to 50 miles (80 km) as to 1 3/4 miles (2.8 km) the Directors would not have recommended it."

Questions were raised about crossing trains (i.e. passing opposing trains on the single line at crossing points) and speed:

"Brunel, dealing with the first point, replied that it would cause no problem, and the Chairman added that while 45 miles per hour (72 km/h) was the ordinary rate of travelling on the Dalkey line, he did not doubt that much higher speeds would be possible over the longer stretches of this line."

The atmospheric system was adopted by the meeting without opposition.

Brunel had emphasised the lower capital and working costs of the system, the latter being £8,000 per annum cheaper, he said, than locomotive operation.

Daniel Gooch, Brunel's locomotive engineer, said:

"I could not understand how Mr. Brunel could be so misled. He had so much faith in his being able to improve it that he shut his eyes to the consequences of failure."

Brunel said:

"I have no hesitation in taking on myself the full and entire responsibility for recommending the adoption of the atmospheric system in the South Devon Railway, and of recommending as a consequence that the line and works should be constructed for a single line only."

And in evidence to the select committee on 4 April 1845, when asked about the ability of the system to bring trains over the steep gradients west of Newton:

"I propose to have different size pipes, or possibly to have double pipes."

== Construction begins ==
Authority having been given and the atmospheric system endorsed, construction was soon started: the line would be a broad gauge single track. Brick arch underbridges were reduced by one ring; overbridges were reduced in headroom by 18 inches (457 mm), and the rails were to be 50 lb/yd (24.8 kg/m) instead of the planned 70 (34.7 kg/m).

These were still early days for contracting large construction projects, and probably for this reason the length from Exeter to Newton was first to be started. At something less than half the full length of the line, and generally close to sea level, this was certainly where the easier engineering lay; nonetheless some engineering challenges presented themselves: chief among these was forming a line at the foot of the steep cliffs around Teignmouth. This alone involved a vast rock cutting operation by blasting, as well as six tunnels and two "covered ways", (Note: Some of these were opened out when the line was later doubled.) and extensive sea wall protection. In addition an eight-span timber bridge over the River Exe immediately south of St Davids station, and a 62 arch viaduct at St Thomas were required.

=== First opening—using locomotives ===
By March 1846 the line between Exeter and Teignmouth was substantially complete except for the laying of the pipe for the atmospheric traction. In order to generate some income the directors decided to open this section using locomotives. Two 2-2-2 locomotives were hired in from the GWR at a hire charge of 1s 4d per train mile; the locomotives were named Exe and Teign. The passenger service started on the Saturday of Whitsun weekend, 30 May 1846, (Note: Sekon says 3 May 1846.) and huge numbers of people travelled. On Whit Monday 1500 passengers were conveyed in the morning train, in 21 carriages. (Note: It is remarkable that the company possessed this number of carriages at such an early date.) Intermediate stations were at St Thomas, Starcross and Dawlish.

There had been delay in extending to Newton (Note: As well as Newton Abbot there was a community called Newton Bushel, a short distance to the west; in early days the station was called simply Newton, to serve both communities. Twentieth century development has long since engulfed both the original settlements.) However a test train was able to run there on 22 December 1846 and on 31 December 1846 (Note: Gregory, page 15; MacDermot says 30 December in volume II, page 210) the passenger service to Newton started; the first train was hauled by the Sun Class locomotive Antelope. The normal service was six trains each way daily, with three on Sundays, all locomotive hauled: the atmospheric pipes were still unavailable.

=== The atmospheric system in use ===
The dates of the first running are inconsistent between commentators, but it is possible to discern the probable sequence.

On 25 February 1847 the first piston carriage was delivered at Exeter and at 6 pm that day it was taken as far as the third engine house, Turf, to clear dirt and water out of the pipe. (Note: Kay quotes Margary's diary, but is clearly dubious; and "when the Starcross - Dawlish tube was similarly cleared of water on 22nd March, Margary says that a locomotive towed the piston carriage. Debris was known to have been drawn into the tube during test pumping and it would hardly have been prudent to assume that the atmospheric system could draw the piston carriage before clearing the tube. (Margary was an engineering assistant to Brunel.)" Gregory, writing in 1982 says that the 25 February trip was "the experimental first run to Turf" (page 20).)

After this there were trips to Turf almost every day.

Sekon records that, "The first experiment of the atmospheric system on the South Devon line was made on 26th February 1847, when a train of two carriages went from Exeter to Turf and back, upon which occasion Mr Brunel said everything gave him full satisfaction."

After several months the first revenue earning train ran on the system:

On 18th August a goods train of eleven trucks, weighing 120 long tons (122 t; 134 short tons), travelled the 8 1/4 miles (13.3 km), Exeter to Starcross, in 15 minutes. (Note: The South Devon was the only railway that ran goods trains on the atmospheric system, according to Kay, page 29.) On 8th September 1847, besides the usual service of trains hauled by locomotives, four extra ones commenced running, these being propelled by the atmospheric system. This was the first public use of the system on the South Devon Railway. Although the line was opened as far as Newton Abbot, between that station and Teignmouth locomotives were employed, but the piston carriage on the down train went on to Newton, where it was taken off with the superfluous carriages and placed on a convenient line to be attached to the up train when required, so that, on arriving at Teignmouth, where the locomotive was removed, the piston carriage started the train when the signal was given.

Later writers assert different dates for these key events. Gregory, writing in 1982 says that the experimental first run to Turf was on 25 February 1847; and he says that it was on "16th August that the first atmospheric train reached [Teignmouth]".

"Early in September a daily goods train was regularly transferred to atmospheric working and the great day when the public could sample it for the first time [i.e. the start of atmospheric passenger train operation] was Monday 13th September [1847]."

"On 17th December ... some service trains were worked for the first time by this method as far as Newton ... and on 23rd February [1848] the changeover [to full atmospheric operation] was complete."

The atmospheric system was first used for revenue earning trains early in September 1847 for goods trains, and the first atmospheric passenger train ran on 13 September 1847, between Exeter and Teignmouth. Two daily return trips now operated on the system, and the train service was progressively transferred to atmospheric; on 23 February 1848 the entire train service was operated on the atmospheric system.

The trains ran well, and the absence of noise and smoke from locomotives was appreciated. In the period from the start of atmospheric operation until 18 January 1848, 884 trains were run, of which 790 had run to time or early; only 10 trains had lost more than ten minutes on the run. However 18 January was a day of severe frost, and the valve was prevented from making a good seal; no trains ran until the afternoon.

Testing continued, and it was found that a train of 28 long tons (28.4 t; 31.4 short tons) ran at an average speed of 64 mph (103 km/h) over a three miles (4.8 km) section; however with a 100-long-ton (102 t; 112-short-ton) train, a maximum of only 35 mph (56 km/h) was attained.

In August 1847 it emerged that Brunel had not yet ordered the engine house machinery for the line beyond Newton. He had originally specified a 13-inch (330 mm) diameter tube and 41 1/2 hp (30.9 kW) engines. Concerned about the tractive capacity, Brunel had substituted a 15-inch (380 mm) tube, and "the machinery was clearly being heavily taxed even on the level section for all but the lightest trains." He had decided to use a 22-inch (560 mm) pipe over the steep gradients west of Newton, and desired to accumulate as much experience as possible before committing himself. He later specified 68 hp (51 kW) engines.

Atmospheric working was extended to Newton on 10 January 1848.

Operating costs were substantially higher than promised; this was particularly the case for fuel for the stationary engines, and daily attention to the tubes and the sealing flap. Despite buoyant income, operating costs had risen to 110% of income; the cost of the atmospheric section was 3s 1½d per mile compared with 2s 6d on the locomotive-hauled sections. In the six months to 30 June 1848 the company made a net loss of £2,487.

=== Technical details of the atmospheric system ===
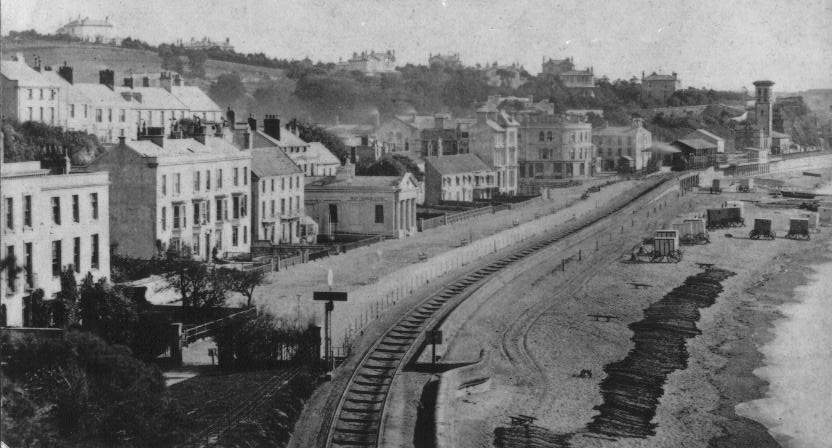
Dawlish in the 1870s with the station and atmospheric pumping in the background

The atmospheric pipe was laid in the centre of the track. In cross-section it was not quite a complete circle, and a continuous slot was formed in the top to pass the bracket of the piston.

On 21 October 1844 a specification for the atmospheric pipes was published: they were to be of 13 inches (330 mm) internal diameter, and

they must be perfectly straight, and their inside diameters smooth and cylindrical. Two gauges will be furnished; one 12 7/8 inches [327 mm] diameter, and one 13 1/16 inches [332 mm] diameter: the smaller one must pass every pipe, and the pipes will be rejected as too large, if the larger one passes.

A 13-inch (330 mm) pipe was to be used between Exeter and Newton, with 15 inches (381 mm) generally being specified west of there, but 22 inches (559 mm) on the inclines. Brunel proposed an expanding piston so that trains could run through. In the summer of 1845 George Hennet had supplied 685 long tons (696 t; 767 short tons) of 15-inch (381 mm) pipe (for 3 miles or 4.8 kilometres) but Brunel decided that 13 inches (330 mm) was inadequate, and that 15 inches (381 mm) should be the minimum.

The slot was sealed by a longitudinal leather valve, that was lifted by rollers on the piston carriage as it passed, to let the piston bracket pass. Samuda was contracted to supply this.

The London and Croydon Railway system employed a metal weather cover over the leather valve, but this was not used on the SDR line.

The stationary steam engines were 40 hp (30 kW) vertical engines operating in pairs. 12 hp (8.9 kW) auxiliary engines were provided at each engine house for water pumping and other purposes. The engine houses were located at intervals of about 3 miles (4.8 km), and had a chimney in an Italianate style. The first four to Starcross were built in red sandstone, and later houses in grey limestone. Pumping was intended to create a vacuum of 15 inches (381 mm) of mercury, but leakage of the valve forced a higher degree of vacuum, to 20 inches (508 mm), to be created at the pump to create adequate vacuum at the remote end of the pipe section.

The piston carriage appears to have been a covered van. (Note: From a contemporary illustration in Kay, page 22; the open truck with a sprung, but exposed, seat often seen in illustrations comes from Samuda's earlier treatise and is indicative only.) The piston was suspended from a bracket under the piston carriage, on a 20-foot (6.1 m) long beam, with a counterweight for balance. It was capable of being raised and lowered, so that at station areas it could be lifted clear. It was not possible to run the tube through pointwork. At some stations an 8-inch (203 mm) auxiliary pipe was provided at the lineside, from which the train could be towed by rope, but in many cases it is likely that horses were used for shunting and marshalling, and human power to move individual vehicles.

At the end of pipe sections there was a metal closure valve to maintain vacuum as the train approached. An automatic release mechanism used the air pressure ahead of the piston after it had passed the main pipe to the engine house, to open the valve. Where engine houses were located between stations, Kay states that the piston carriage passed from one pipe section to the next at full speed. It is not clear how the closure valve on the forward pipe was opened.

Brunel developed a system for use at level crossings. A metal flap lay across the pipe so that wheeled vehicles could cross, but as the pipe was exhausted a piston caused the flap to rise clear of the piston bracket.

Pumping to evacuate the pipe started between 5 and 8 minutes before the time a train was expected to enter the pipe section. For a long period there was no electric telegraph communication, so that the pumping had to start before the scheduled entry time; in the event of late running this meant wasted pumping. (The telegraph was commissioned on 2 August 1847; Brunel had inexplicably delayed its installation, and even now did not allow its use at night.)

It was possible to connect two section of pipe and for one engine house to exhaust both sections. This could be done in the event that an engine was temporarily inoperable.

=== Serious doubts—and abandonment ===
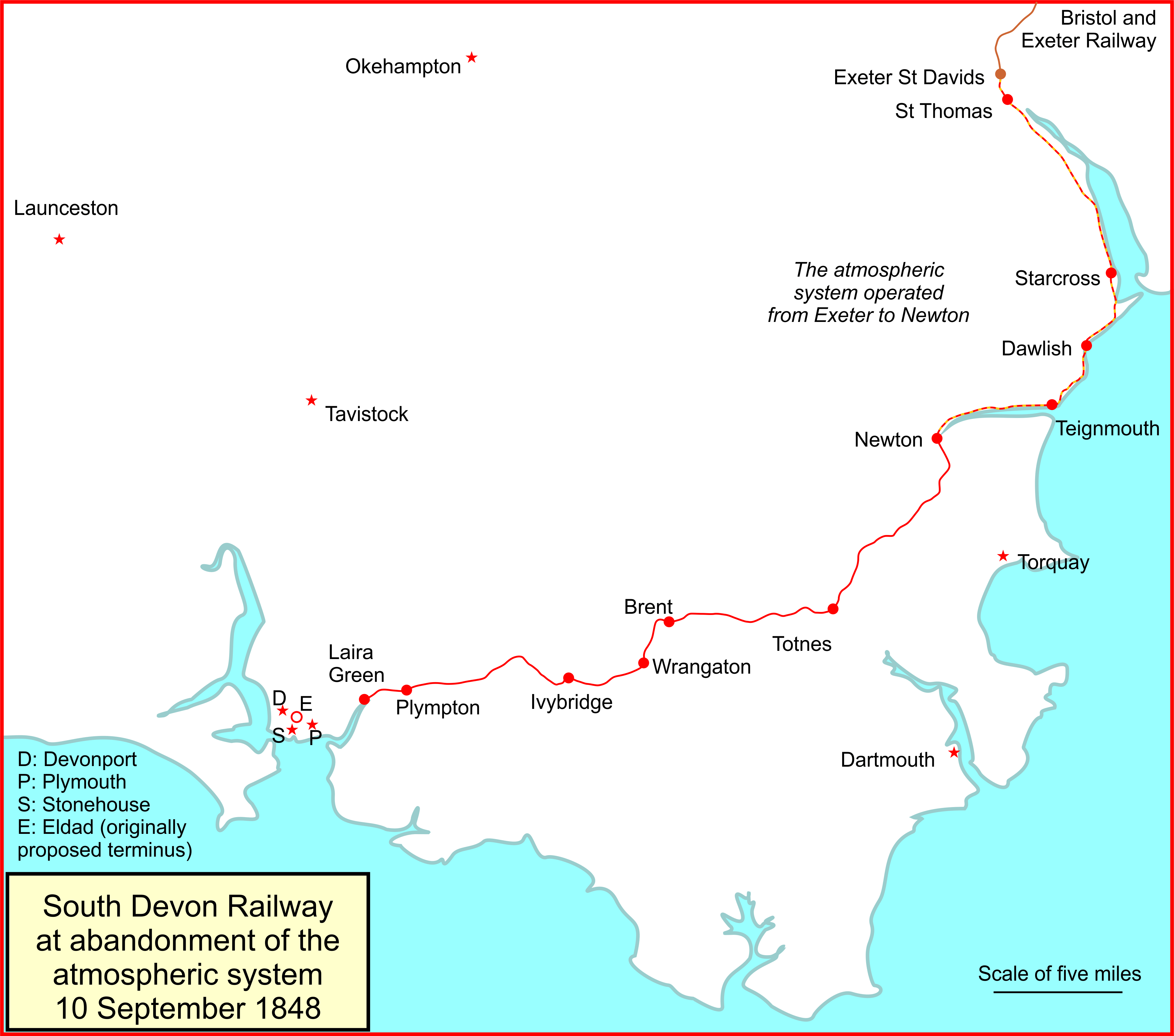
Map of the SDR system in 1848

Throughout the early stages of the company's existence, there had been doubters about the atmospheric system; and these people were often most vociferous when some setback or failure was reported. The alarming news was revived that on 4 May 1847 the London and Croydon Railway had decided to abandon the atmospheric system on their line, due to insuperable technical problems.

Scepticism took effective form at the shareholders' meeting of August 1847. Promoted by a deputation the previous day led by George Hudson, (Note: Hudson was a director of the Midland Railway, which had a substantial shareholding. When the SDR was created the Bristol and Gloucester Railway was a member of the broad gauge group and had subscribed; the B&GR later passed into Midland hands, and the shareholding with it.) the doubts resulted in a resolution to delay expenditure west of Totnes until after the next meeting. In fact at that meeting in February 1848 Brunel was evasive about the experience with the system, and on 28 March 1848 the board instructed him to suspend work on the engines west of Totnes, and on 20 June they told him to dispose of those engines when complete.

Gradually through the summer the opinions of the board members, and ultimately of Brunel, shifted against the atmospheric system. At a board meeting on 28–29 August, Brunel suggests that Samuda (who still had contractual obligations to ensure effective operation of the system) might be unable to put matters right, and by the end of the second day the board had decided to terminate the affair. The shareholders' meeting took place on 29 August 1848 and it now seemed that everyone was against the atmospheric, and a stormy meeting approved the suspension of the use of the system unanimously.

In fact the decision was to suspend until Samuda put the system into working order, but it was obvious he was not in a position to do so, and the last atmospheric train was an up goods arriving at Exeter at 12:30 in the small hours of Sunday 10 September 1848.

The atmospheric system was at an end on the South Devon. The atmospheric engine houses were shut up and never worked again. £433,991 had been spent on equipment for the system; the company had no locomotives and could not afford to purchase any; it was building a single line, relying on the atmospheric system to obviate double track; and it had to proceed with the construction to Torquay and Plymouth.

== Completion to Plymouth ==
=== Construction from Newton to Laira ===
The line was opened from Newton to Totnes for passengers on 20 July 1847, and for goods trains on 6 December 1847. The atmospheric system was still in operation as far as Newton, and locomotive haulage was used beyond. Brunel pressed ahead with the section from Totnes to Plymouth, and this included more engineering structures than the previous sections. A trial run to a temporary station known as Laira (at Laira Green on the outskirts of Plymouth) was made on 27 April 1848 and the Board of Trade Inspector, Captain Symons, visited on 29 April. Approval having been obtained, the line opened on 5 May 1848. Goods traffic was not carried until 13 September 1848.

Laira was some considerable distance short of Plymouth. The Plymouth and Dartmoor Railway (P&DR) crossed the path of the SDR there and ran on alongside the River Plym to wharves near Laira Bridge. It was a primitive horse-drawn tramway used for bringing granite down to the riverside from near Princetown, although its traffic volumes had declined very considerably. The South Devon Railway Act 1844 included powers to purchase this section of the P&DR, subject to agreeing terms with the owners, but the negotiations were frustratingly slow.

The SDR started to lay their new main line across the course of the P&DR at Laira without agreement, and the P&DR owners responded by depositing large blocks of granite there, blocking the SDR.

The Laira station was immediately on the Exeter side of the Laira crossing, (Note: From the map in Gregory, page 120; and the mileage of the station was 244m 40c; the later Laira signal box was at 244m 42c; see MacDermot vol II and Cooke.) at the turnpike bridge.

The only intermediate station was at Wrangaton (later renamed Kingsbridge Road), but additional stations at Brent, Ivybridge and Plympton were opened soon afterwards, and Cornwood was provided with a station in 1852. Double track was laid on Rattery Bank, and from Hemerdon to Laira Green.

=== Laira Green to Plymouth and Devonport ===
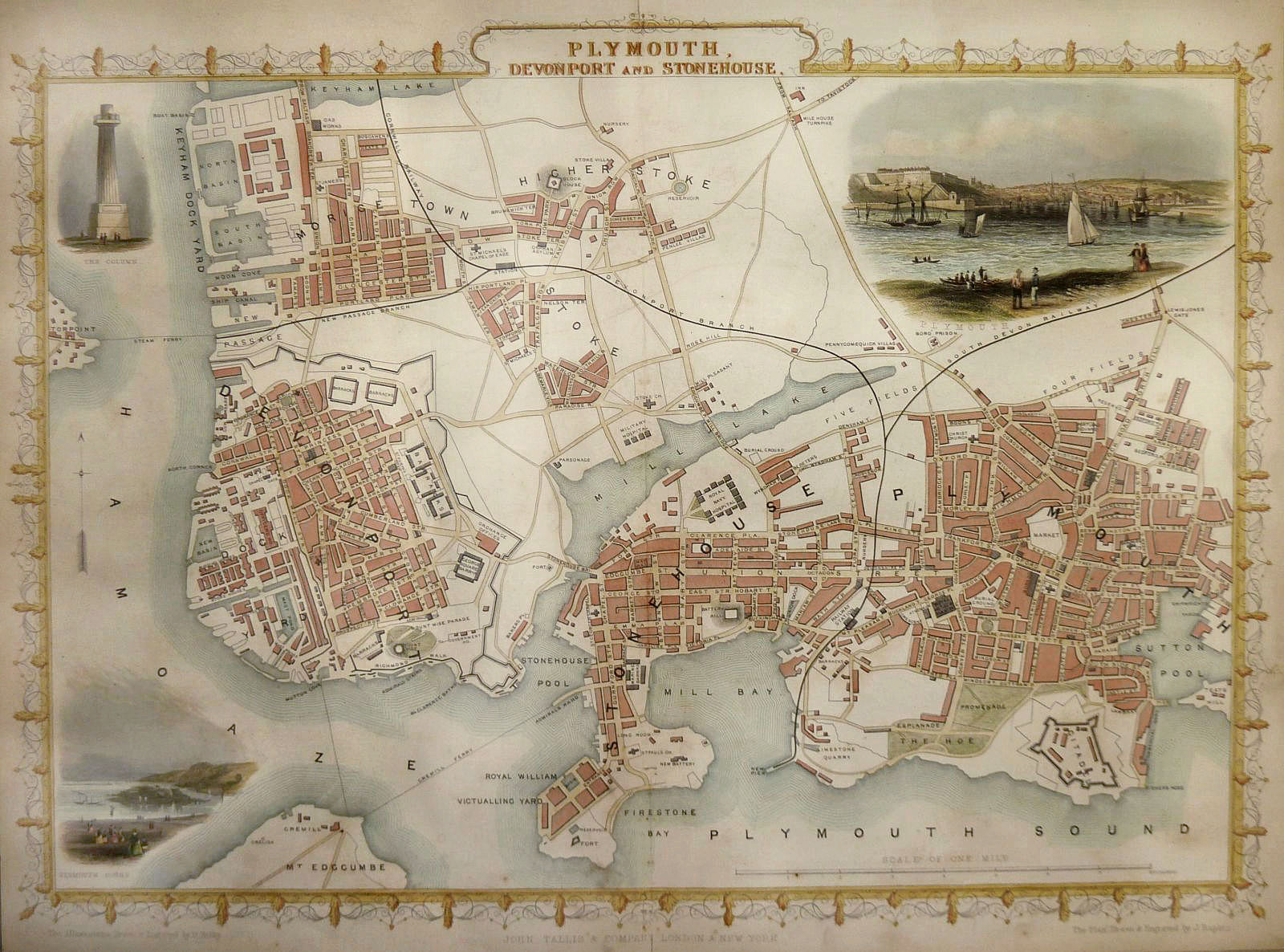
1854 map of Plymouth and Devonport, showing the New Passage branch, which was not in fact built.

The differences with the proprietors of the P&DR were settled, and opening could take place to Plymouth. The original Eldad terminus had been omitted by the South Devon Railway (Amendment and Branches) Act 1846 (9 & 10 Vict. c. ccccii), and a terminus in Plymouth at Millbay was adopted instead. There was intense rivalry between the Three Towns of Plymouth, Devonport and East Stonehouse at that time, and sensitivities were inflamed by the change. In an attempt to mollify opinion in Devonport, a branch to New Passage (on the Tamar) was now proposed, with a station in Devonport near Albert Road. The branch was built as far as the Devonport station with the junction there formed, but not extended to New Passage. The Devonport branch was transferred to the Cornwall Railway by the powers of Cornwall Railway Amendment and Deviation Act 1847 (10 & 11 Vict. c. lxxii), and it later formed the eastern part of its main line.

The public opening of the extension to "Plymouth" (the station later named Millbay) took place on 2 April 1849. Goods traffic started on 1 May 1849.

== Branches built by the South Devon company and its allies ==
=== Torquay and the Kingswear branch ===
South Devon Railway (Amendment and Branches) Act 1846
- Act of Parliament
- Parliament of the United Kingdom
- Long title: An Act for authorizing certain Alterations in and Extensions of the Line of the South Devon Railway, and the Formation of Branches therefrom to Torquay and other Places.
- Citation: 9 & 10 Vict. c. ccccii

Dates
- Royal assent: 22 July 1847

Text of statute as originally enacted

South Devon Railway (Extensions and Amendment) Act 1847
- Act of Parliament
- Parliament of the United Kingdom
- Long title: An Act to enable the South Devon Railway Company to extend the Line of the South Devon Railway to Torquay and to Brixham; and for other Purposes.
- Citation: 10 & 11 Vict. c. ccxlii

Dates
- Royal assent: 22 July 1847

Text of statute as originally enacted

The company had determined to build a branch to Torquay, and it obtained South Devon Railway (Amendment and Branches) Act 1846 (9 & 10 Vict. c. ccccii) giving it powers to construct as far as "a certain field in the Parish of Tormoham, which was as near as the House of Lords would allow them to get to Torquay". That line was opened from Newton (Abbot) to a Torquay station on 18 December 1848. Powers for an extension to a more central Torquay location and to Brixham were secured in the South Devon Railway (Extensions and Amendment) Act 1847 (10 & 11 Vict. c. ccxlii). However this was not proceeded with and in fact the extension was made by the independent Dartmouth and Torbay Railway, under powers obtained in 1857.

It opened from the SDR Torquay station as far as Paignton on 2 August 1859, with a station at Torquay. The SDR Torquay station was renamed Torre on the same day, and the SDR worked the new line. The short section incorporated an exceptional number of engineering structures; at Newton the branch ran alongside the main line for a mile to Aller. The line was further extended to Brixham Road (later renamed Churston) on 14 March 1861. Both the openings were for passengers only, goods traffic starting between Torre and Brixham Road on 1 April 1861.

At this stage the D&TR contemplated crossing the River Dart at Greenway so as to reach Dartmouth itself, but this failed due to opposition by a landowner. After some delay the company completed its line from Brixham Road to Kingswear on 16 August 1864, and a ferry was instituted by the company, connecting Dartmouth to the Kingswear station. Goods traffic did not start operating until 2 April 1866.

The SDR worked the entire line, and leased it in perpetuity from 1 January 1866. The Dartmouth and Torbay Railway Company then existed only as a financial entity and was absorbed in 1872.

=== Docks at Plymouth ===
In 1850 the South Devon Railway formed a rail connection from Milbay railway station to the Millbay Pier of the Plymouth Great Western Dock Company, which was enlarging and improving the Millbay dock accommodation. (Note: This seems to have been limited to forming a connection with the Plymouth Great Western Dock Company's own lines; no mileage increment is shown in MacDermot's table of mileages, at page 620 of volume II.)

The SDR itself was making a branch from Laira to Sutton Harbour, and this opened in May 1853; horse traction only was permitted at first and the line was formed by conversion of the south-western extremity of the Plymouth and Dartmoor Railway line. The branch was closed from May 1856 until October 1857, during which time it was realigned to ease some very sharp curves. From April 1869 locomotives were used.

=== Cornwall Railway ===
The Cornwall Railway opened its broad gauge line on 4 May 1859, from Cornwall Junction, a short distance north of the South Devon's Plymouth station. Cornwall Railway trains used the station, which was enlarged to handle the additional traffic. (It remained simply "Plymouth" until renamed Plymouth Millbay on 1 May 1877.)

=== Tavistock and then Launceston ===
Tavistock was an important town lying to the north of Plymouth, and after considerable parliamentary struggles, the South Devon and Tavistock Railway was authorised by the South Devon and Tavistock Railway Act 1854 (17 & 18 Vict. c. clxxxix) to build its broad gauge line from a junction east of Laira to Tavistock. It opened that line on 22 June 1859; it was leased to, and worked by the South Devon Railway until it was purchased by them, effective from July 1865.

The gauge wars were the struggle for possession of territory between railway companies that used the broad gauge and the standard gauge respectively; the SDR used the broad gauge and was allied with (and exchanged traffic with) other broad gauge lines. In 1861 standard gauge interests sought to penetrate into north Devon and north Cornwall, and as a defensive measure the SDR promoted an extension of the Tavistock line to Launceston. This was done through the medium of a separate company, the South Devon and Launceston Railway, which obtained an authorising act of Parliament, the Launceston and South Devon Railway Act 1862 (25 & 26 Vict. c. cxi). The line opened for passenger traffic on 1 July 1865 and to goods in October 1865. It was worked by the SDR and absorbed by it at the end of 1873.

As the line was promoted as an obvious attempt to frustrate standard gauge intentions to enter the area, Parliament inserted a clause into the Launceston and South Devon Railway Act 1862 requiring standard gauge rails to be laid if requested by a connecting company, if so ordered by the Board of Trade. This later enabled trains of the London and South Western Railway to reach Plymouth over the South Devon lines.

=== Moretonhampstead ===
Also encouraged as a tactical measure to frustrate narrow gauge incursion, the Moretonhampstead and South Devon Railway was promoted locally, the South Devon Railway subscribing £500 of the £105,000 capital. The line opened on 4 July 1866; it was 12 mi (19 km) long and climbed steadily from Newton (Abbot) to Moretonhampstead, gaining 550 ft (170 m) on the journey through Teigngrace and Bovey.

=== Brixham ===
The Torbay and Brixham Railway was built independently, and almost solely due to the efforts of a local proprietor of the fishing harbour, R. W. Wolston. The line opened on 28 February 1868 between Brixham Road station, on the Dartmouth and Torbay Railway line, to Brixham. Brixham Road station was renamed Churston on the same day. The line was worked by the SDR until 1876, when a dispute over charges and commission led the little company to work its own line for a period. In 1883 the line was sold to the Great Western Railway for £12,000.

=== Buckfastleigh ===
The Buckfastleigh, Totnes and South Devon Railway was incorporated in 1863, taking powers to extend its proposed line to Ashburton in 1864. It opened between Totnes and Ashburton on 1 May 1872, and added a branch to Totnes Quay on 10 November 1873. At first the Totnes Quay branch was worked by horses, any mechanical power being prohibited, but this rule was removed and locomotive power used as far as the level crossing from 24 August 1874.

=== Exeter City Basin ===
The South Devon Railway added a quayside branch to the Exeter Canal at City Basin on 17 July 1867.

== Progress 1849 to 1876 ==
=== Line capacity ===
In 1849 the company had completed its main line to Plymouth, and the Torquay branch; it was in an alliance with the Bristol and Exeter Railway and the Great Western Railway, and the friendly Cornwall Railway was constructing its main line; the SDR therefore formed part of a broad gauge network connecting Devon, and soon Cornwall, with Bristol and London. However its main line was single track only with difficult gradients and it had expended its financial resources on the abortive atmospheric system, and very soon rapidly increasing demand became the dominant problem.

In the summer of 1850 the line was overwhelmed by the traffic offering, and some trains took six hours to run from Plymouth to Exeter due to congestion. The configuration of the passing places may have been largely responsible. A start was made on improving line capacity by doubling the line from Aller to Totnes, which including the difficult climbs to the summit at Dainton; from Newton to Aller the Torquay branch had run parallel to the main line, and the two single tracks were converted to a double line, with a new junction being formed at Aller. The double track was put into use on 29 January 1855. In the same period layout improvements were made at the crossing places at Dawlish, Teignmouth and Kingsbridge Road, and at Totnes, this work being completed in 1856, and in August 1856 the Chairman announced that it was not planned to double any further sections of the route.

The company sought powers to widen some remaining sections in the 1859 parliamentary session, and in the period to 1865 the line was doubled from the west end of the Exe Bridge at Exeter to Starcross, and from Teignmouth west end to Newton.

A further series of capacity improvements took place from 1874 to 1875, when a third track was laid from Newton to Aller, restoring the independent access to the Torquay branch; and Starcross to Dawlish was doubled.

=== Station improvements ===
Following the completion of the main line, new stations were opened at Exminster and Cornwood in 1852.

The Plymouth station, at Millbay, was designed as a simple terminal for the SDR. When the Cornwall Railway was nearing completion, the Plymouth station was expanded to accommodate that company's traffic, an apportionment of the capital and running costs being agreed. The enlargement was ready for the opening of the Cornwall line on 4 May 1859, but already the Tavistock and South Devon line was nearing completion, and would bring more traffic to Plymouth. Further extensive improvements were put in hand and substantially complete by 1863.

== Amalgamation and after ==
The company was amalgamated with the Great Western Railway (GWR) on 1 February 1876; subsequent development of the SDR system is summarised here.

Shortly after the amalgamation the London and South Western Railway (LSWR) arrived in Plymouth and a joint station was opened at North Road. The LSWR had long wished to reach Devon and Cornwall, but its early aspirations had been frustrated, and it was not until 1860 that it reached Exeter. Gradual extensions, in some cases using nominally independent promoters, resulted in its reaching Lidford (spelt Lydford from 1897) on 12 October 1874. The Launceston and South Devon Railway had been absorbed by the South Devon Railway in 1869, but under the terms of the Launceston and South Devon Railway Act 1862 it was required to lay 'narrow gauge' (Note: Narrow gauge, now called standard gauge. At the time there was no "standard" and the term 'narrow gauge' was in general use.) rails when requested by any connecting narrow gauge line. Consequently, the SDR had to lay a narrow gauge rail, forming mixed gauge track, from Lidford to Plymouth, and to allow LSWR trains to run over the line. However the SDR managed to prevaricate and delay the actual running of the LSWR trains to Plymouth until 17 May 1876.

The gauge on all remaining lines was converted to 4 ft 8 1/2 in (1,435 mm) standard gauge on 21 May 1892. Previous to this, the line from Tavistock Junction to North Road in Plymouth had been mixed gauge to allow the London and South Western trains to travel over the broad gauge tracks. Similarly, one of the two tracks from Exeter as far as City Basin had been mixed. The conversion to standard gauge for the entire Exeter to Plymouth section was carried out after the last broad gauge train that ran to Plymouth on Friday 20 May had returned empty to Swindon depot (where it was immediately scrapped). The work was complete ready for the first standard gauge train to run on Monday 23 May.

The GWR had taken possession of a busy main line that still included single line sections from Dawlish to the Old Quay beyond Teignmouth station, and from Rattery summit to Hemerdon. In July 1884 the section from the west end of Parson's Tunnel to Teignmouth Old Quay was doubled; this included opening out the 320-yard (290 m) East Cliff Tunnel at Teignmouth. The next section dealt with from Rattery to Hemerdon was more challenging, involving five large new masonry viaducts as well as Marley Tunnel; the double line was opened in stages progressively in 1893, completing on 19 November 1893. This left a short section through five tunnels west of Dawlish: this was taken on from 1902, being completed and opened on 1 October 1905.

The Great Western Railway was nationalised on 1 January 1948. From that date, the former South Devon Railway became the responsibility of British Railways, Western Region.

== Route ==
After leaving the former Bristol and Exeter Railway station at Exeter St Davids, the line crosses the River Exe and then passes through the southern margin of Exeter along a stone viaduct. Once out in the countryside it follows the Exe southwards down to Dawlish Warren, passing at the edge of rocky cliffs through short tunnels and the longer Parson's Tunnel to Teignmouth. Here turning west it follows the north bank of the River Teign to Newton Abbot, where the company's workshops were located.

Beyond Newton Abbot the main line climbs up a sustained two-mile (3.2 km) gradient of 1 in 36 (2.78%) at the steepest point to a summit at Dainton Tunnel, then falling for four miles (6.4 km) gradients nearly as steep to cross the River Dart at Totnes. It then climbs steeply again at up to 1 in 47 (2.13%) for three miles (4.8 km) to a summit at Rattery, then easing a little for six miles (9.7 km) of moderately steep climb to Wrangaton. From there it falls for six miles (9.7 km) on moderately steep gradients to Hemerdon, there descending at 1 in 42 (2.38%) for two miles (3.2 km) to Plympton. From there the line follows the north bank of the River Plym, passing through a tunnel near Mutley, running to the present-day Plymouth station. Beyond there, a short length of the main line to Cornwall is formed of the original main line, after which the line turned south to the original terminus at Millbay; this is no longer in existence.

The Torquay branch diverges from the main line a little south-west of Newton abbot at Aller Junction, and climbs to Torre station high on the north-west edge of Torquay itself.

== Passenger stations ==
Stations opened after the SDR was absorbed by the GWR in 1876 are shown in italic.

Exeter to Plymouth

- Exeter St Davids - Bristol and Exeter Railway station used by arrangement
- St Thomas (Exeter) - renamed St Thomas in April 1853; renamed Exeter St Thomas May 1897
- Exminster - opened late August 1852; closed 30 March 1964
- Starcross
- Warren Halt; opened 1 July 1905; (Note: Oakley says "on about 1 August 1905.) renamed Warren Platform on 1 July 1907, and renamed Dawlish Warren on 1 October 1911; relocated a short distance to the north 23 September 1912
- Dawlish
- Teignmouth
- Newton renamed Newton Abbot 1 March 1897
- Totnes
- Brent - opened 15 June 1848; closed 5 October 1964
- Wrangaton - renamed Kingsbridge Road May 1849 and reverted to Wrangaton 1 July 1895
- Bittaford Platform; opened 18 November 1907, closed 2 March 1959
- Ivybridge - opened 15 June 1848, closed 2 March 1959; new station opened about one mile east on 15 July 1994
- Cornwood Road opened late August 1852, renamed Cornwood April 1864
- Plympton - opened 15 June 1848, closed to passengers on 2 March 1959 and to goods traffic on 1 June 1964
- Laira - temporary terminus at Laira Green closed 2 April 1849 to passengers and 1 May 1849 to goods
- Laira Halt; opened 1 June 1904, closed 7 July 1930
- Lipson Vale Halt opened 1 June 1904, closed 22 March 1942
- Mutley - opened 1 August 1871; closed 3 July 1939
- Plymouth North Road - opened 28 March 1877, renamed Plymouth 16 September 1958
- Plymouth - joint with the Cornwall Railway; renamed Plymouth Millbay from 1 May 1877, closed to passengers 24 April 1941 and to goods traffic 20 June 1966

Torquay branch

- Kingskerswell - opened 1 July 1853; closed 5 October 1964
- Torquay - renamed Torre 2 August 1859.

== Locomotives ==
The company hired locomotives from the Great Western Railway to haul their trains until the atmospheric system was ready for operation. In the event, locomotives were needed on a more permanent basis and so a series of contracts were entered into with contractors to provide the power for the trains. From 1867 the company bought the locomotives and operated them.

The South Devon Railway also operated all the connecting branches in Devon and so their locomotives operated on these. The Cornwall Railway also contracted their motive power from the same company as the South Devon Railway. From 1867 the South Devon Railway also bought the Cornwall Railway locomotives and operated them as a single fleet with their own, and also the ones now purchased for the West Cornwall Railway.

Most of the locomotives were 4-4-0 tank engines for passenger trains and 0-6-0 tank engines for goods trains. Later some smaller locomotives were purchased for branch lines and the dock branches.

== Accidents and incidents ==
- On 27 June 1849, the boiler of Great Western Railway Hercules class locomotive Goliah exploded whilst it was hauling a freight train at Plympton. One person was killed.

== See also ==
- South Devon Railway (heritage railway)
- Exeter–Plymouth line
- South Devon Banks
- South Devon Railway sea wall
