= South Devon Railway sea wall =

Sea wall on the south coast of Devon, England

Coordinates: 50.5690°N 3.4694°W

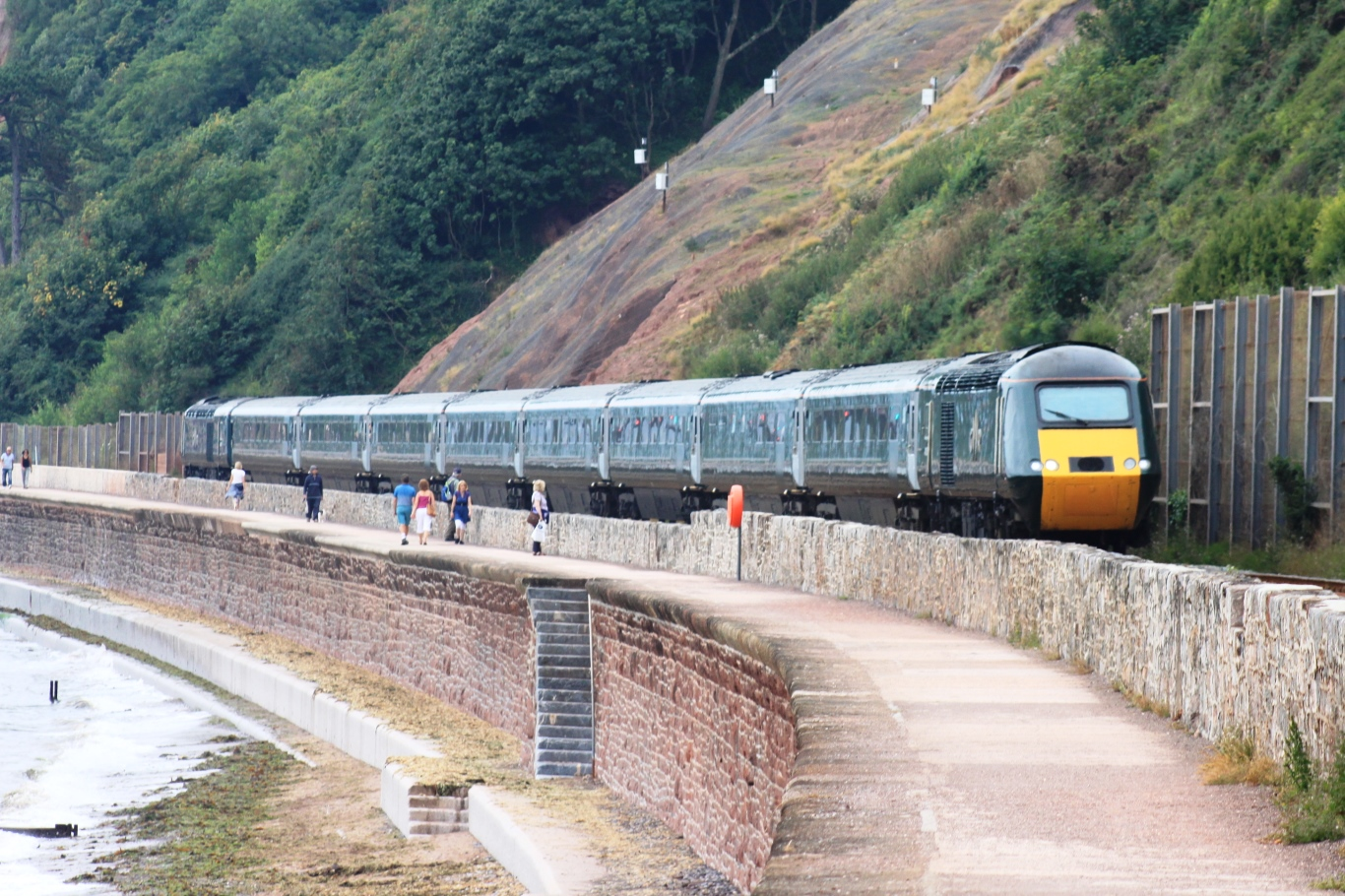
An InterCity 125 train operated by Great Western Railway on the sea wall near Parson's Tunnel

The South Devon Railway sea wall is situated on the south coast of Devon in England. A footpath runs alongside the railway between Dawlish Warren and Dawlish, then another footpath forms a continuation to the sea front promenade at Teignmouth. Both of these form part of the South West Coast Path.

The South Devon Railway was built to the designs of Isambard Kingdom Brunel; it takes a route from Exeter which follows the River Exe to Dawlish Warren, runs beneath the sea cliffs to Teignmouth and then follows the River Teign to Newton Abbot. It follows tidal waters for about 13 miles (21 km), 4 miles (6.4 km) of which are open sea.

== Background ==
The section of railway was opened by the South Devon Railway Company, running from Exeter St Davids railway station to Teignmouth railway station on 30 May 1846 and extended to Newton Abbot railway station on 31 December 1846. It was a broad gauge railway of 7 ft 1/4 in (2,140 mm) gauge and intended to be worked as an atmospheric railway, although atmospheric trains only ran from 13 September 1847 until 9 September 1848.

The South Devon Railway was amalgamated into the Great Western Railway on 1 February 1876 and the gauge converted to the standard 4 feet 8½ inches after 20 May 1892. A station was opened to serve Dawlish Warren in 1905, all the other stations on the sea wall having opened with the line in 1846.

The Great Western Railway was nationalised into British Railways on 1 January 1948. The line is now owned by Network Rail and the stations and majority of trains operated by the modern-day Great Western Railway.

== Storm damage ==
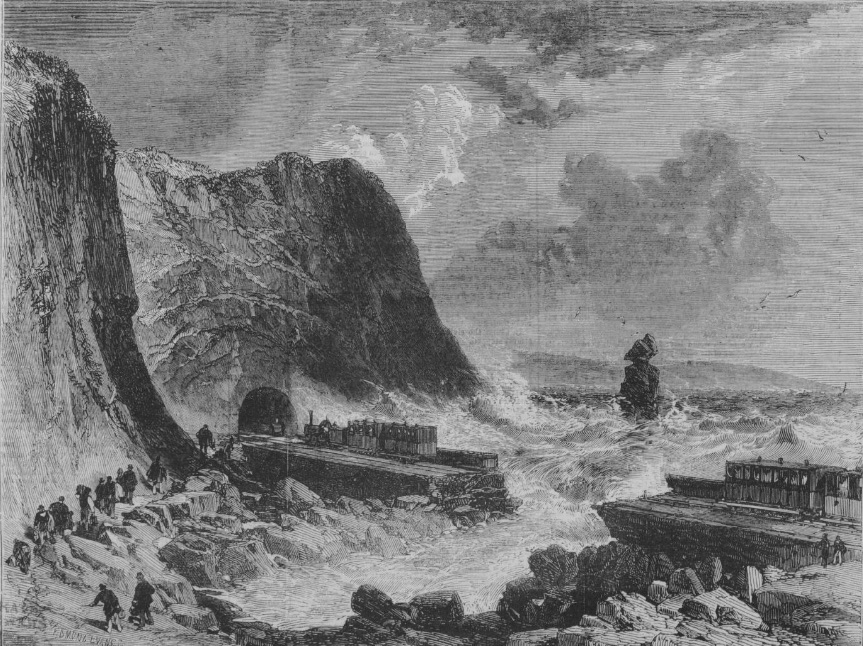
Illustrated London News 3 March 1855. Sketch by F. W. L. Stockdale.

The sea wall has always been prone to damage during stormy weather as it runs alongside the open sea at the base of cliffs for four miles (6.4 km). The first time this occurred was just a few months after the line opened. In September 1846 repairs were necessary to the wall north of Parson's Tunnel which had been built with loose rock instead of the masonry wall seen elsewhere, and then on 4 October storms broke through the wall in several places and services had to terminate at Dawlish. That night the high tide flooded the line where it ran alongside the River Exe and more breaches occurred as the storm continued into Monday. South of Parson's Tunnel the sand was scoured from the beach and this caused another cavity under the wall. Repairs started on 7 October, when the storm had died down. Trains could run through to Teignmouth again after just 50 hours and the loose rock was replaced by a permanent wall the following winter.

On the morning of 24 December 1852 there was a rock fall from the cliff at Breeches Rock, the same place that the wall had been damaged in 1846. A train was stopped before it hit the rocks and the passengers had to walk past the blockage to join trains on the other side, but the line was reopened after a few hours. Later that week a larger fall happened which blocked the line early on 29 December, this time knocking some of the wall into the sea. Passengers were transferred between Dawlish and Teignmouth by road for two days, after which trains could approach the blockage so passengers could again walk past to join trains on the other side. The line reopened for through trains after a total of four days.

On Monday 12 February 1855 large portions of the sea wall were washed away. Despite repair work starting promptly four days later more of the sea wall and a long 70 yards (64 m) section of line were also washed away. Passengers were obliged to leave their trains and carry their luggage some distance to join another. A temporary viaduct was constructed by the resident engineer, Mr. Margery, and was in operation within a couple of weeks which allowed the through operation of coaches, pulled by hand and rope, although some nervous passengers still alighted and walked.

Such was the terrific force of the impelled water that along the sea-wall and railway huge coping-stones, probably averaging one ton each, were tossed about like corks....

— The Illustrated London News, 1859.

The night of 25 October 1859 saw the largest storm to hit Devon in 35 years. The Exe river wall was damaged at Turf and Powderham. On the coastal section the dividing wall between the footway and railway was knocked down near Langstone, while the line was flooded where it was at beach level between Dawlish and Kennaway tunnel. At Teignmouth the top of the wall was damaged and the sea flooded through Eastcliff tunnel into the station. One train was stuck at Dawlish but the line reopened at 11 a.m. on 27 October when a line was reinstated at Turf.

The sea undermined the wall north of Dawlish on 31 January 1869 leading to the collapse of 80 yards (73 m) of wall. A train was stopped at Dawlish where passengers were taken by road to Dawlish Warren to join a special train, even though there was no station at the Warren at this time. After this passengers were taken to Starcross until a temporary line across the breach was opened for traffic on 4 February. This was the section south of Rockstone where no footway was provided to keep good views from the houses behind the railway. After the breach it was rebuilt at the higher level that had been used from Rockstone to Langstone from the opening of the line.

The winter of 1872-1873 saw a series of breaches. On Christmas Day 1872 around 60 yards (55 m) of wall was washed away by heavy waves near Rockstone. Engineers were laying a second track here so this was brought into use later the same day although passengers had to change trains between the two lines until the original line could be restored. Only a few days later, on 30 December, a larger breach undermined the tracks at the same place causing trains to stop either side of the gap until 1 January 1873. Then early on the morning of 1 January another 40 yards (37 m) of sea wall was breached between 30 yards (27 m) and 40 yards (37 m) above the breach of Christmas Day. This breach washed out 0.25 miles (0.40 km) of the sandstone rock on which the wall was originally built, the wall being completely undermined in places with cavities up to 2 feet (0.61 m). Despite this, trains continued to run on the new single track. Most of the repairs were destroyed in a gale during the night of 1-2 February and also a section 30 yards (27 m) to the north. The three breaches stretched over 200 yards (180 m) and it was feared that Rockstone footbridge might collapse. Road transport was instigated between Dawlish and Starcross including extra horses and wagonettes brought up from Plymouth by special train. The carriages of the overnight mail train to London was pushed across on 3 February and services then started to return to normal.

After the storms of 1873 there was no significant damage for fifty years. Some preventative work was started in 1918 to reduce the likelihood of cliff falls near Langstone and Sprey Point. While this was taking place a cliff fall blocked the line near Sprey Point on 12 March 1923. One track was reopened on the 14th and the second on the 22nd.

Single line working was needed on 24 December 1930 when the wall was undermined at Riviera terrace north of the Coastguard footbridge. Late on 4 January 1931 another storm caused a 50 feet (15 m) section here to be undermined and the material supporting the track was sucked out. The hole was filled by granite blocks and quick-setting cement. Single-line working was possible from midday on 8 January. Later that year 638 yards (583 m) of wall foundations were strengthened and some of the groynes that prevent the beach being eroded were lengthened. There was a breach of the river wall at Powderham on 10 February 1936 which closed the line until 12 February.

On Christmas Eve 1929 a large portion of the wall near the Coastguard Station cracked and gave way, causing partial subsidence of the down line. Traffic was able to continue on the up line. Whilst repairs proceeded quickly, on 4 January 1930 another breach occurred when the foundations of the track were washed away leaving a chasm 25 feet (7.6 m) deep and extending for 50 feet (15 m) which resulted in the complete closure of the line. Repairs were undertaken under the supervision of Mr. H.E. Damen, a divisional engineer, and the line re-opened within three days.

On 17 November 1965 stormy seas created a 60 feet (18 m) gap in the sea wall between Dawlish and Dawlish Warren. British Rail managed to keep services running with trains restricted to 10 miles per hour (16 km/h) but repairs took three weeks.

The first significant closure in fifty years occurred in 1986 between Smuggler's Lane bridge and Sprey point. The sea wall was undermined early on 26 February and material was washed out from beneath the down line, although the wall did not collapse. The sea kept removing stones until the hole was 30 yards (27 m) long. Two more holes opened over the next few days, one either side of the original. Both tracks were closed to regular traffic but engineering trains were able to use the line closest to the cliffs to bring in material to fill the hole. On 1 March freight trains were allowed to use the single track between engineering operations. Providing buses for passengers was difficult over the weekend of 1-2 March as resignalling work was taking place north of Exeter so most spare buses were already committed to cover services to Taunton. Freight and long-distance passenger traffic along the sea wall resumed on the single line on 3 March but local services continued to be replaced by buses until the second line was reopened on 11 March.

The first blockage of the 21st century occurred in September 2006. A storm hit during the afternoon of the 21st and trains were operated in both directions on the up line which kept them further away from the waves that were breaking over the wall. The following day there was a wash out north of Dawlish station which caused the down line to be closed, but normal working resumed on 23 September.

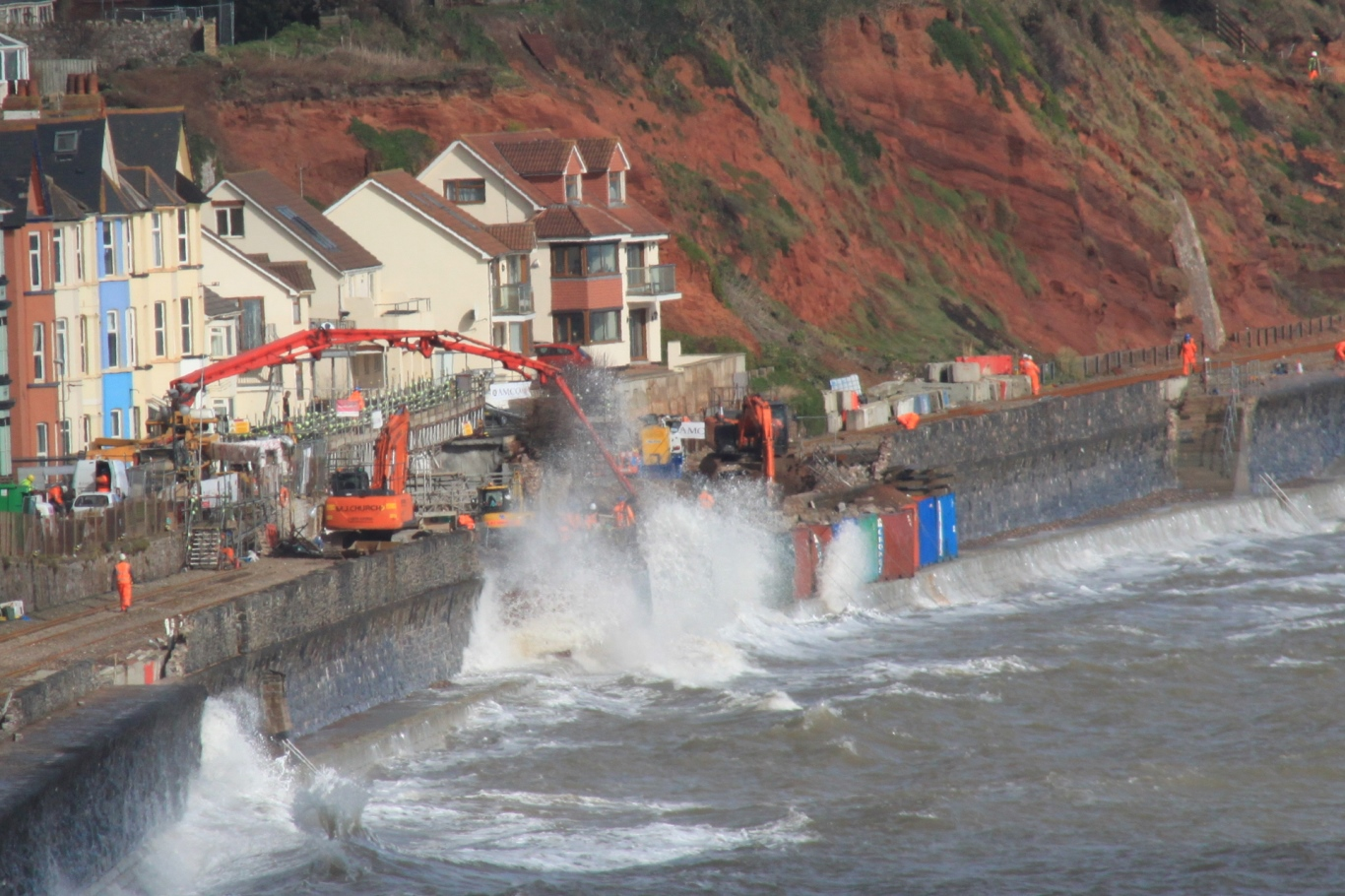
Repairing the breach in the sea wall at Dawlish, February 2014

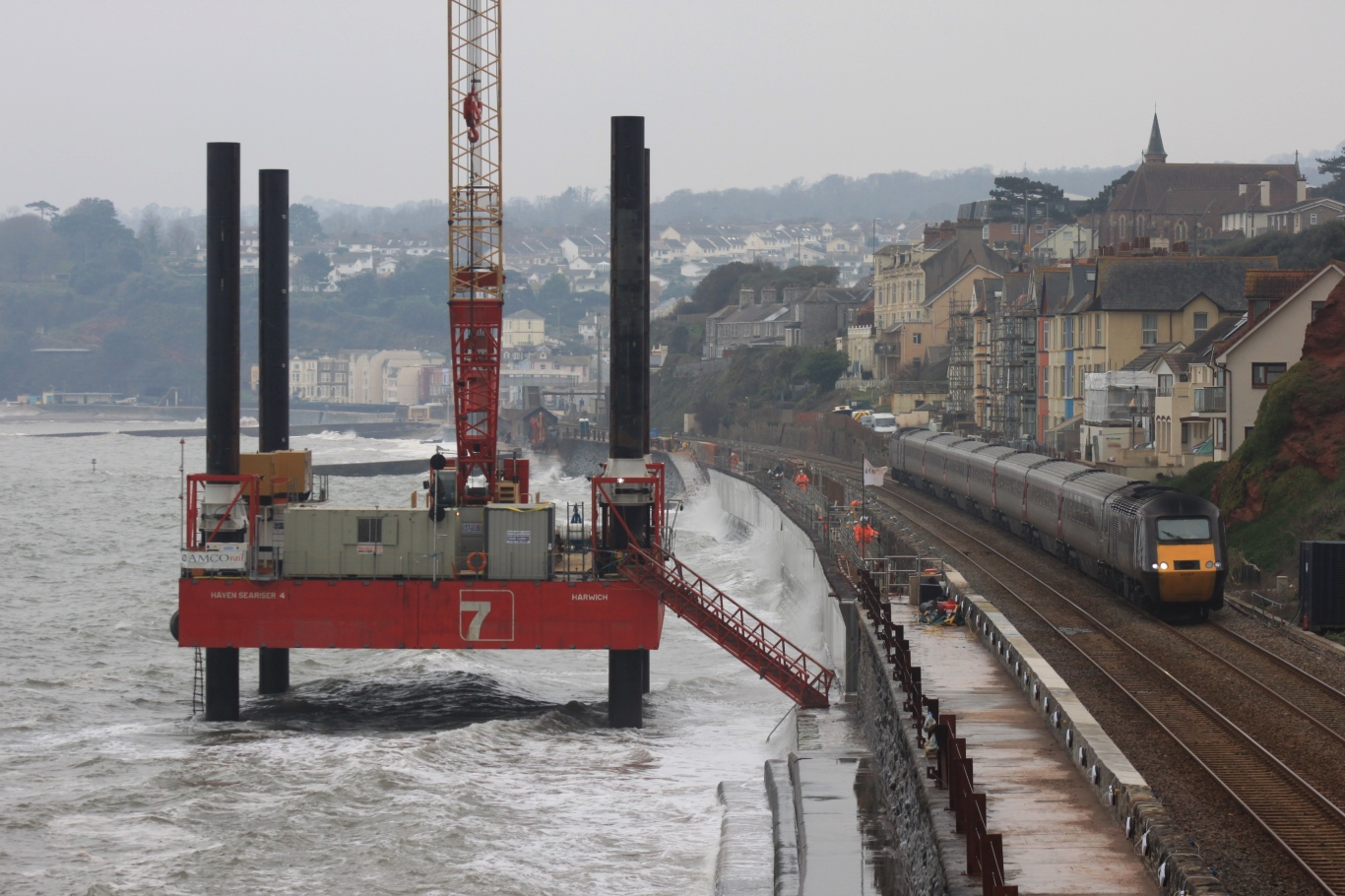
A mobile platform used during the rebuilding of the sea wall in 2014-2015

On the night of 4 February 2014, amid high winds and extremely rough seas, part of the sea wall at Dawlish was breached, washing away around 40 metres (130 ft) of the wall and the ballast under the railway immediately behind. It was initially hoped that the line would only be closed for a short time but further storms prevented work to repair the railway; the repair and resumption of train service eventually took two months. On the morning of 5 February the hole and exposed railway track were reassessed. Powerful waves caused further damage to the track, sea wall, and Dawlish station on 6 February. The Department for Transport said the "most pressing issue" was to get the line up and running as soon as possible, "but equally it is clear it is important we look at the long term as well". Repairs were finally completed at the beginning of April 2014, with the first train (the 05:34 Exeter St Davids to Paignton) running on schedule on the morning of Friday 4 April.

Network Rail issued a black alert on the 23 January 2026, suspending rail services between Exeter St Davids and Newton Abbot due to predicted waves of 4 metres (13 ft) and 60 miles per hour (100 km/h) winds with a risk of the wall being breached. The subsequent storm caused sea water to wash onto the tracks at Dawlish, and knocked over a 80–90 feet (24–27 m) section of the wall between the footpath and the railway. Network Rail stated "There doesn't appear to be any damage to the structure of the railway track but the sea has deposited a large amount of chunky debris onto the track." Great Western Railway added that the storm had caused "significant debris" to be left on 2 miles (3.2 km) of track requiring removal. A limited rail service was restored on the morning of the 25 January 2026.

Blockages
Date	Days	Reason	Location
1846	3	Damaged wall	Breeches Rock
1852	7	Rock fall	Breeches Rock
1853	4	Rock fall	Kennaway Tunnel
1855	12	Damaged wall	Smuggler's Lane
1859	3	Damaged wall	Teignmouth
1869	5	Damaged wall	Dawlish (San Remo)
1872	1	Damaged wall	Langstone
1872	3	Damaged wall	Langstone
1873	3	Damaged wall	Langstone
1873	1	Damaged wall	Langstone
1923	3	Rock fall	Sprey point
1930	5	Damaged wall	Dawlish (Riviera Terrace)
1936	12	Damaged wall	Powderham
1986	6	Damaged wall	Sprey point
2006	1	Damaged wall	Dawlish (Rockstone)
2014	59	Damaged wall	Dawlish (Riviera Terrace)
2014	59	Rock fall	Holcombe
2026	2	Damaged wall	Dawlish (Sea Lawn Terrace)

== Diversionary routes ==
The frequent blockages to the coastal line led to people asking for a new inland route. There were local suggestions in 1872 for a new line from Eastdon near Starcross but letters in The Times demanded that one be built along the Teign valley. A single-track branch line along the Teign valley was indeed opened from Heathfield in 1882 but was not connected to Exeter until 1903. A proposal for a Brent, Ashburton and Heathfield Railway was published in 1898 which would have extended the Teign Valley line to Brent. This would have given a route that was 6 miles (9.7 km) shorter between Exeter and Plymouth while avoiding the sea wall and some steep inclines around Totnes.

In the 1930s the GWR surveyed an inland deviation termed the Dawlish Avoiding Line, initially in 1936 proposed progressing 1 kilometre (0.62 mi) inland between Exminster and Bishopsteignton, and a 1937 shorter route ending west of Dawlish. After gaining parliamentary approval for the required bill, construction started in Spring 1939, but the advent of World War II brought the project to an end. The GWR was nationalised into British Railways on 1 January 1948, and the land sold. The powers of the associated Act of Parliament only lapsed in 1999.

When the GWR line along the sea wall was converted from broad gauge to standard gauge in 1892 all traffic had to be suspended. The mail train for the two days that the line was closed was diverted over the London and South Western Railway route between Exeter and Plymouth. During World War II a new connection was laid between this route (now part of the Southern Railway) and the GWR's Cornish Main Line at St Budeaux on the northern outskirts of Plymouth in March 1941. This was done to provide an alternative route to the naval dockyards at Devonport in case enemy action damaged the GWR route. This connection was retained after the war and was available as a diversionary route if the sea wall was blocked. Regular trains were worked over the Southern and Western routes by each other's trains so that crews were familiar with the alternative route, however the Southern route could only take locomotives up to 4-4-0 size due to restrictions on Meldon Viaduct.

In 2010 it was stated in Parliament that "in recent years" around £9 million had been invested on keeping the sea wall safe and the cliff faces stable, and that the ongoing maintenance of the sea walls and the adjoining estuaries was costing Network Rail around £500,000 annually. The Under-Secretary of State for Transport reiterated the importance of the line to the economy of South Devon and Cornwall, and confirmed that even if there were to be plans for the building of an alternative inland route in the future, "in our view, it would not be a substitute in any shape or form for the main line along the coast". This is despite the acknowledgement of an inevitable increase in maintenance costs due to rising sea levels.

== South West Rail Resilience Programme ==
Network Rail set up the South West Rail Resilience Programme after the 2014 storm. In 2018 Network Rail put forward a proposal to extend the sea wall further into the English Channel at Teignmouth, with the wall passing through Sprey Point. The proposal would have involved re-aligning the railway, moving the line further from the cliff and creating a space between them to prevent the railway's being affected by cliff subsidence or collapse. Other elements of the proposal included the improvement of the sea wall between Kennaway Tunnel and Dawlish and the installation of an avalanche shelter-style structure at Horse Cove. Government funding of £80 million to raise the sea wall south of Dawlish station by 2.5 metres (8.2 ft) was approved in February 2019. The 109-metre (360 ft) rockfall shelter at the northern end of Parsons Tunnel, near Holcombe, was built between 2021 and 2023 at a cost of £48 million.

The plans for track realignment at Teignmouth were delayed in 2020 following public opposition and then abandoned. Instead Network Rail proposed leaving the track in its existing location, and dealing with the danger from the cliffs using a programme of targeted solutions including soil nailing, netting and groundwater management. By the end of 2024, £165 million had been spent over ten years on the South West Resilience Programme. However, funding was no longer available for the final phase of the plan, intended to stabilise the cliffs on the 1.8 kilometres (1 mile) stretch between Parson's Tunnel and Teignmouth. In the following year the local MP, Martin Wrigley, lobbied for the reinstatement of funds to cover the remaining costs of the project, estimated to be around £80 million, and a local petition was set up. Trial work was begun in 2026 to determine whether pumping water out of the cliffs would prevent landslips.

== Operation ==
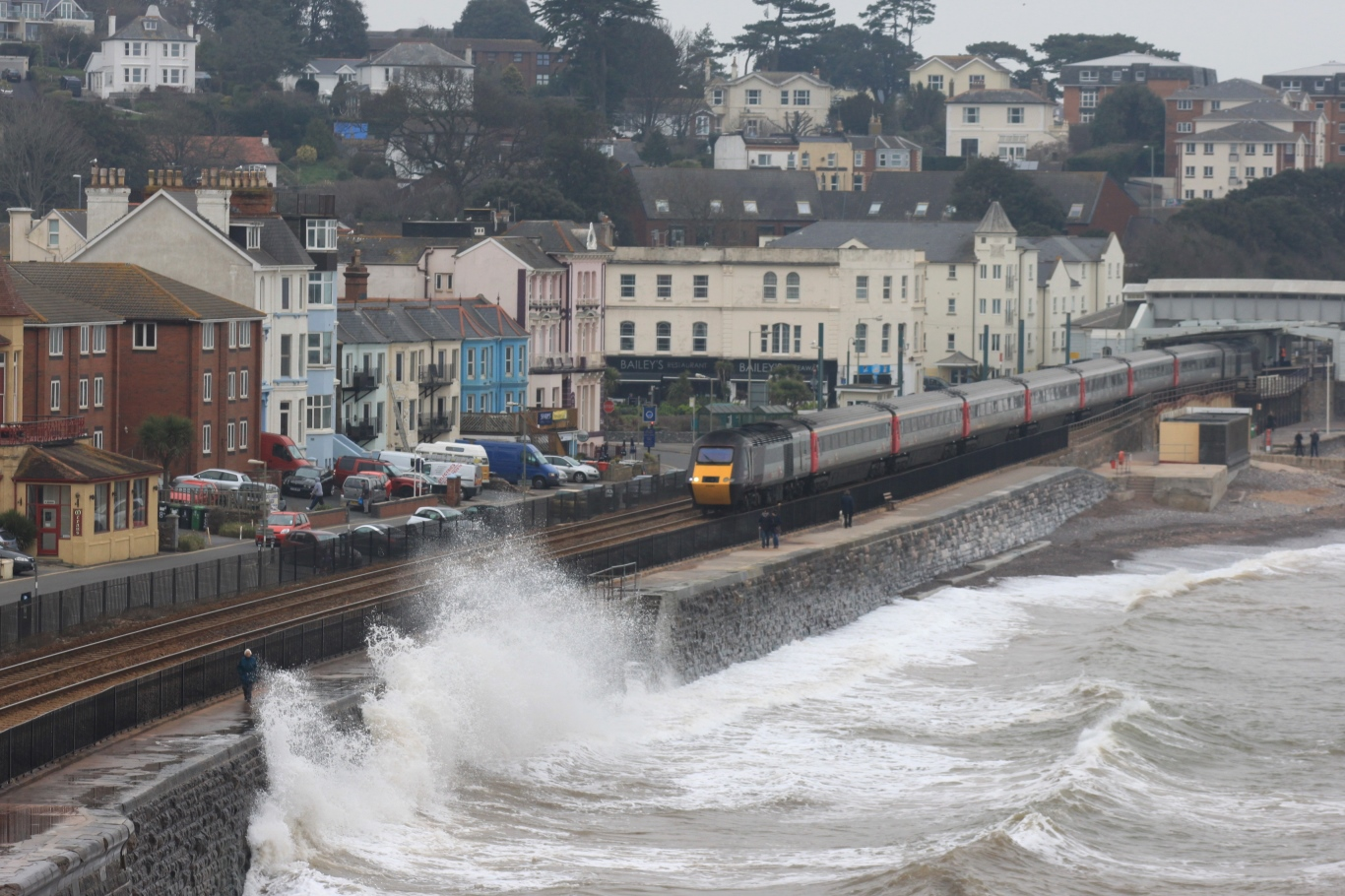
A Class 43 passes waves breaking over the line at Dawlish

The railway along the sea wall has two tracks but they are signalled in a special way. In normal circumstances trains will run on the left track, so 'down' towards Newton Abbot on the side nearest the sea and 'up' towards Exeter on the track nearer the cliff. Facing crossovers were provided at both Dawlish Warren and Teignmouth when the route was resignalled in 1986 and reversible signalling provided on this track. This enables down trains to run on the up line when appropriate. It was intended for use during storms to keep trains further away from the sea, but may also be used at other times when train services are disrupted.

== The route ==
=== River Exe ===
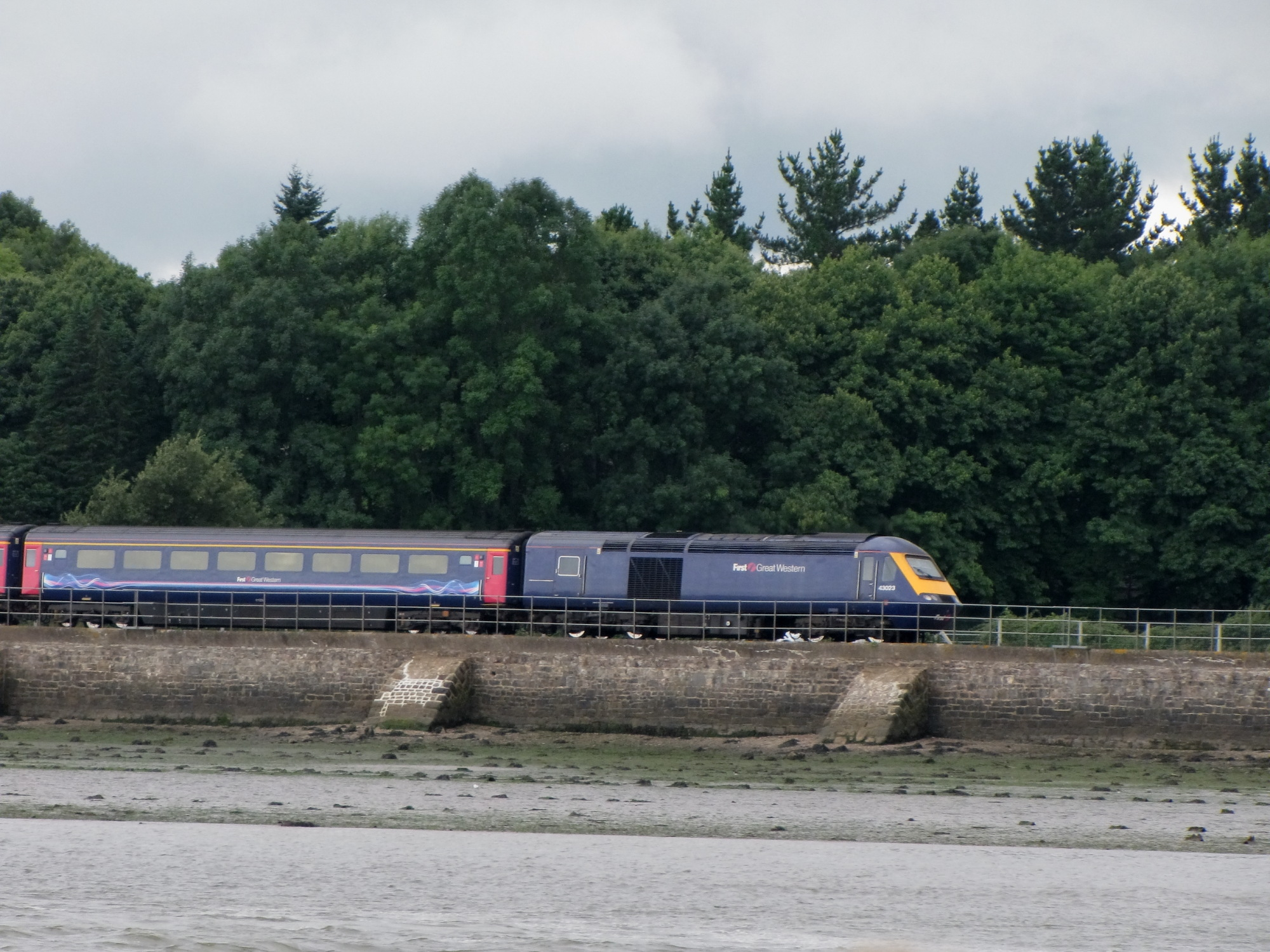
A First Great Western InterCity 125 approaching Starcross

The river comes into view at Turf. The square pond and disturbed ground between the railway and river are the remains of Turf engine house, one of the engine houses used for powering the atmospheric trains. After a short distance the river wall comes alongside the railway at Powderham. After passing the railway then runs between the river and the deer park of Powderham Castle, to Starcross railway station, situated in the middle of Starcross village. Opposite the pier for the ferry to Exmouth is the Starcross engine house.

A little farther along the river, the railway crosses the mouth of Cockwood harbour. Near here was the 1,285-foot (392 m) long Exe Bight Pier, in use from 1869 for about ten years. On the opposite side of the river trains can sometimes be seen near Lympstone Commando railway station.

The river enters the sea at Exmouth while the railway runs behind the sand dunes of Dawlish Warren to reach Dawlish Warren railway station.

=== Sea wall ===
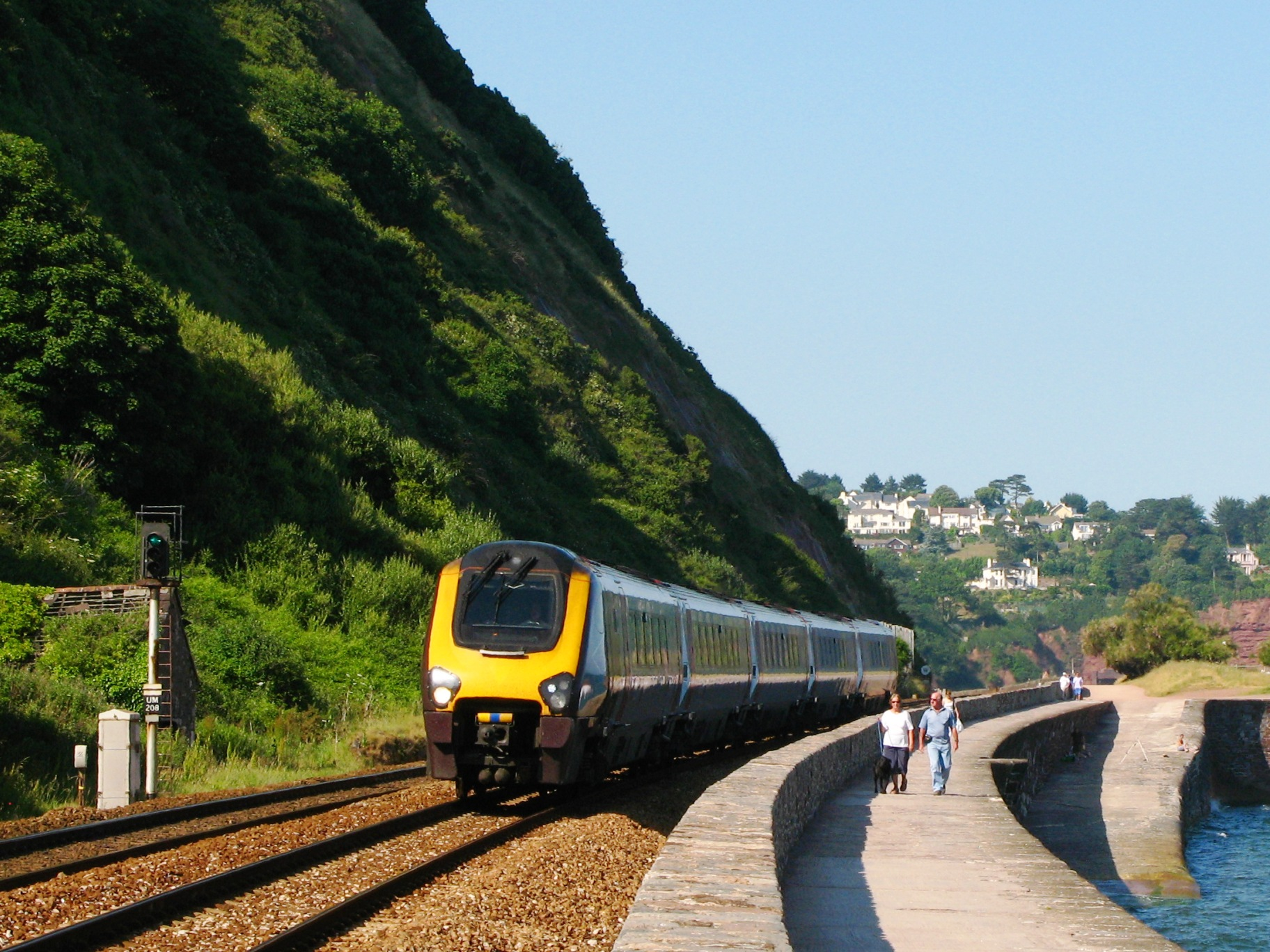
A CrossCountry Class 221 Super Voyager passes walkers near Teignmouth

On leaving Dawlish Warren the railway comes onto the sea wall proper with the walkway alongside, although it quickly enters the short and deep cutting at Langstone Rock. Emerging above the beach, views can be had towards Torbay.

A footpath, which is mostly level with the track, follows the railway as far as the Kennaway Tunnel at Dawlish. Just before reaching Dawlish railway station is a footbridge at Coastguard's Cottage. This was used by the railway during its construction and then sold to the coastguard; their boat house is at the top of the beach next to the footbridge. The town of Dawlish can be seen off to the right from Colonnade Viaduct at the other end of the station.

The line now enters its first tunnel, Kennaway, beneath Lea Mount, beyond which is Coryton beach, the farthest point accessible by the sea wall footpath from Dawlish. The Coryton tunnel leads to the next beach, Shell Cove, accessible by foot only via the shore at very low tide or by a private path from the clifftop. The railway then passes through Phillot Tunnel and Clerk's Tunnel, emerging onto a section of sea wall at Breeches Rock before diving into Parson's Tunnel beneath Hole Head. The last two tunnels are named after the Parson and Clerk Rocks, a natural arch in the sea off Hole Head.

Beyond Parson's Tunnel is a short viaduct across Smugglers Lane and then the footpath resumes for the final stretch past Sprey Point to the cutting at Teignmouth Eastcliff. On the landward side of the railway near Sprey Point can be seen the remains of a lime kiln used during the construction of the line.

=== River Teign ===
After passing through Teignmouth railway station, the line continues through a cutting to emerge behind the busy Teignmouth Harbour, after which the railway resumes its course alongside the River Teign estuary. The cuttings on both sides of the station used to be tunnels, but they were opened out between 1879 and 1884.

After going under the Shaldon Bridge and passing a boat yard on the site of Teignmouth gas works, the line follows the river past the small promontories at Flow Point, Red Rock, and Summer House, before passing through two small cuttings and crossing Hackney Marshes near the race course to reach Newton Abbot railway station.

Across the river opposite Summer House can be seen the waterside inn at Coombe Cellars.
