= Dawlish Warren =

Seaside resort settlement in Devon, England

Coordinates: 50.598°N 3.444°W

- Location within Devon
- OS grid reference: SX979786
- Civil parish: Dawlish
- District: Teignbridge
- Shire county: Devon
- Region: South West
- Country: England
- Sovereign state: United Kingdom
- Post town: DAWLISH
- Postcode district: EX7
- Dialling code: 01626
- Police: Devon and Cornwall
- Fire: Devon and Somerset
- Ambulance: South Western
- UK Parliament: Newton Abbot

Dawlish Warren is a seaside resort near to the town of Dawlish, in Teignbridge on the south coast of Devon, England. At the 2025 census, it had a population of 1,221. Dawlish Warren consists almost entirely of holiday accommodation and facilities for holidaymakers, especially on caravan sites.

== Location ==
Dawlish Warren is located at the mouth of the Exe Estuary opposite Exmouth and has a beach, a National Nature Reserve spanning 506 acres (2 km^{2}) and a golf course, which is classified as a Site of Special Scientific Interest (SSSI).

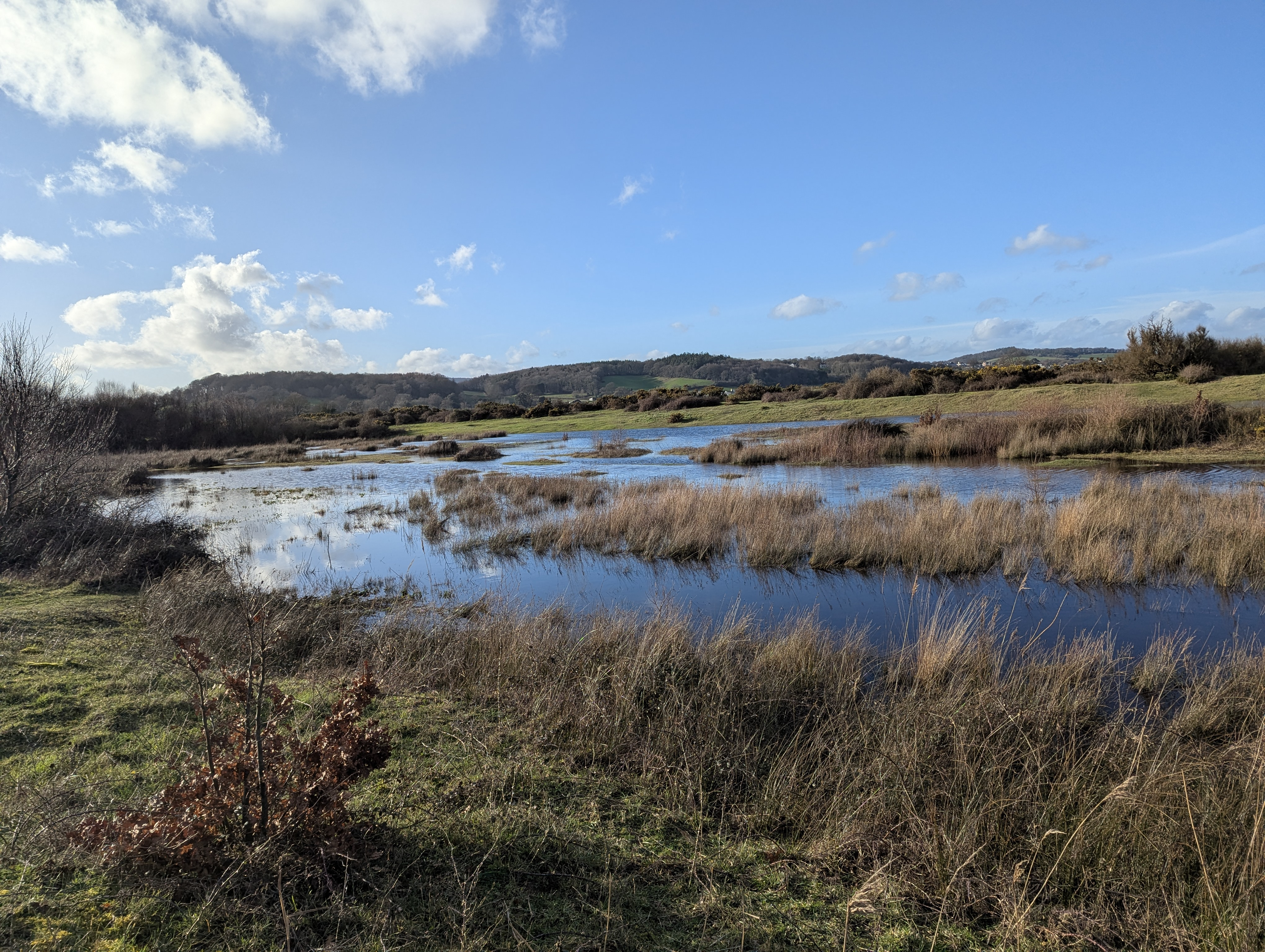
A freshwater pond at the Dawlish Warren National Nature Reserve

The renowned sand spit at Dawlish Warren is the location of both the golf course and the nature reserve which was declared a National Nature Reserve in 2000. This spit has reduced in size within the past century due to erosion partly caused by the installation of a breakwater at Langstone Rock to the south-west which traps sand from the local sandstone cliffs and interrupts the natural sediment flow of the area.

The resort is popular with holidaymakers and although a death occurred from E. coli poisoning in 1999, allegedly caused by a nearby sewage outflow, a new sewage treatment plant has since been built resulting in both Dawlish Warren and Dawlish beaches now winning the Blue Flag for the quality of the bathing waters.

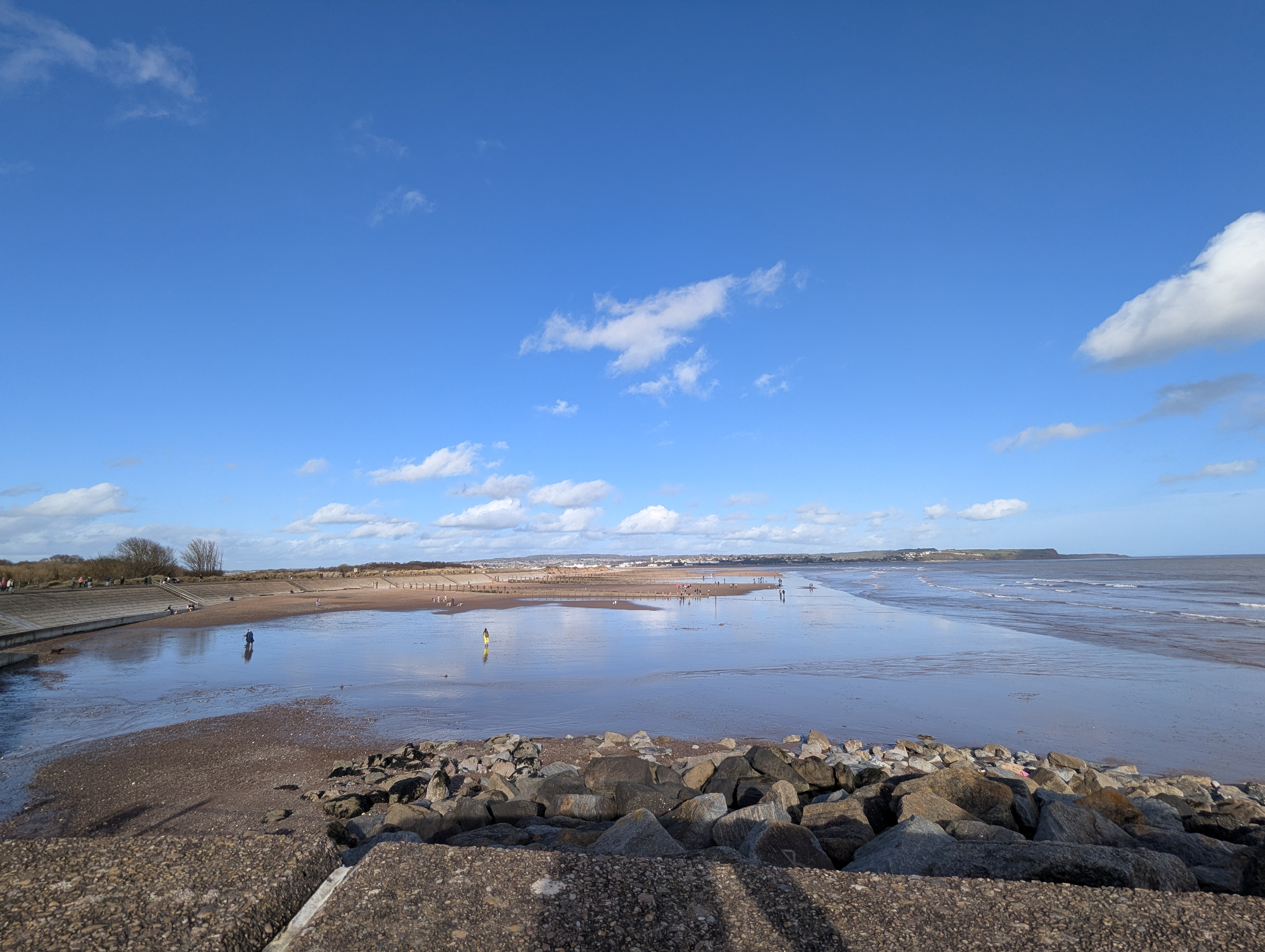
Dawlish Warren Beach looking towards Exmouth

== Tourism ==
Along with neighbouring Dawlish, this corner of south Devon has a favourable climate, which draws thousands of visitors to the area in summer. Because of this, the Dawlish Warren economy relies heavily on tourism, and in particular on the many caravan and camping parks in the village which add over 15,000 to the local population during the summer months. There are several holiday parks which attract visitors from all over the UK, but in particular the West Midlands and South Wales. The major holiday parks are Welcome, Hazelwood, Cofton, Golden Sands, Dawlish Sands, Peppermint Park, Lady's Mile and Oakcliff. In 2008 Peppermint Park and Golden Sands joined Dawlish Sands as part of Park Holidays UK Caravan Parks. The name 'Peppermint Park' has gone and the site has been rebranded 'Golden Sands'.

== Amenities ==
Dawlish Warren has a doctor's surgery, a pharmacy and an independent supermarket, along with several gift shops which cater for tourist traffic.

There are a number of restaurants and takeaway eateries. There are many bars and pubs such as the Warren Bridge Inn and the Mount Pleasant Inn, which dates from before the 1750s and is located just outside the resort.

== Transport ==
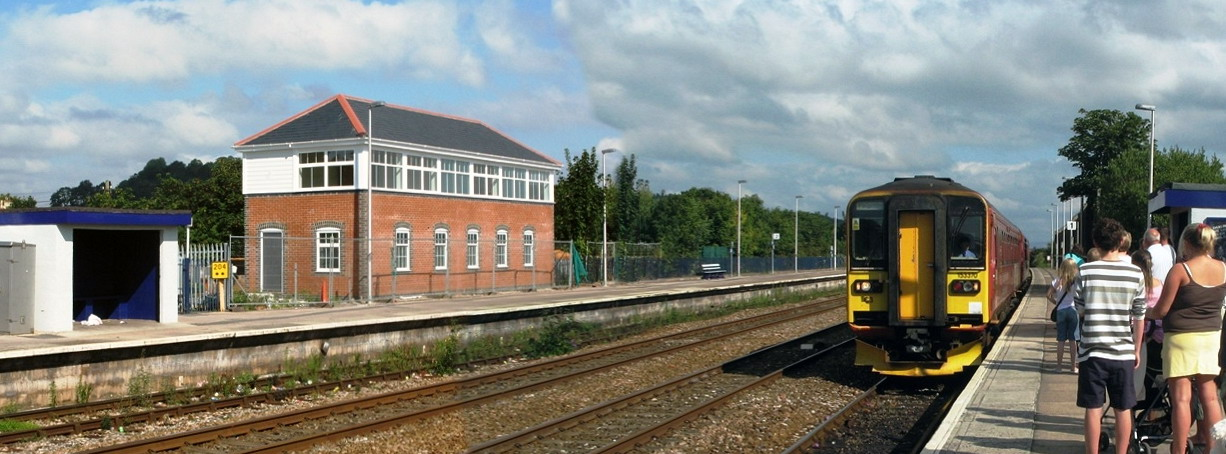
A train bound for Paignton stopping at the station

The resort is served by Dawlish Warren railway station, situated a few minutes from the beach. It lies between the stations of Dawlish and Starcross on the Riviera Line, a section of the Great Western Main Line between London Paddington and Penzance in Cornwall. Stopping services are operated by Great Western Railway, on a route between Exmouth, Exeter and Paignton.

Dawlish can be reached by a 1.5-mile (2.4 km) walk south-west along the South Devon Railway sea wall.

Local bus services are operated predominantly by Stagecoach South West; key routes that serve the town include:

- 22: Dawlish Warren to South Devon College in Paignton
- 187: Dawlish Warren to Dawlish

== Religion ==
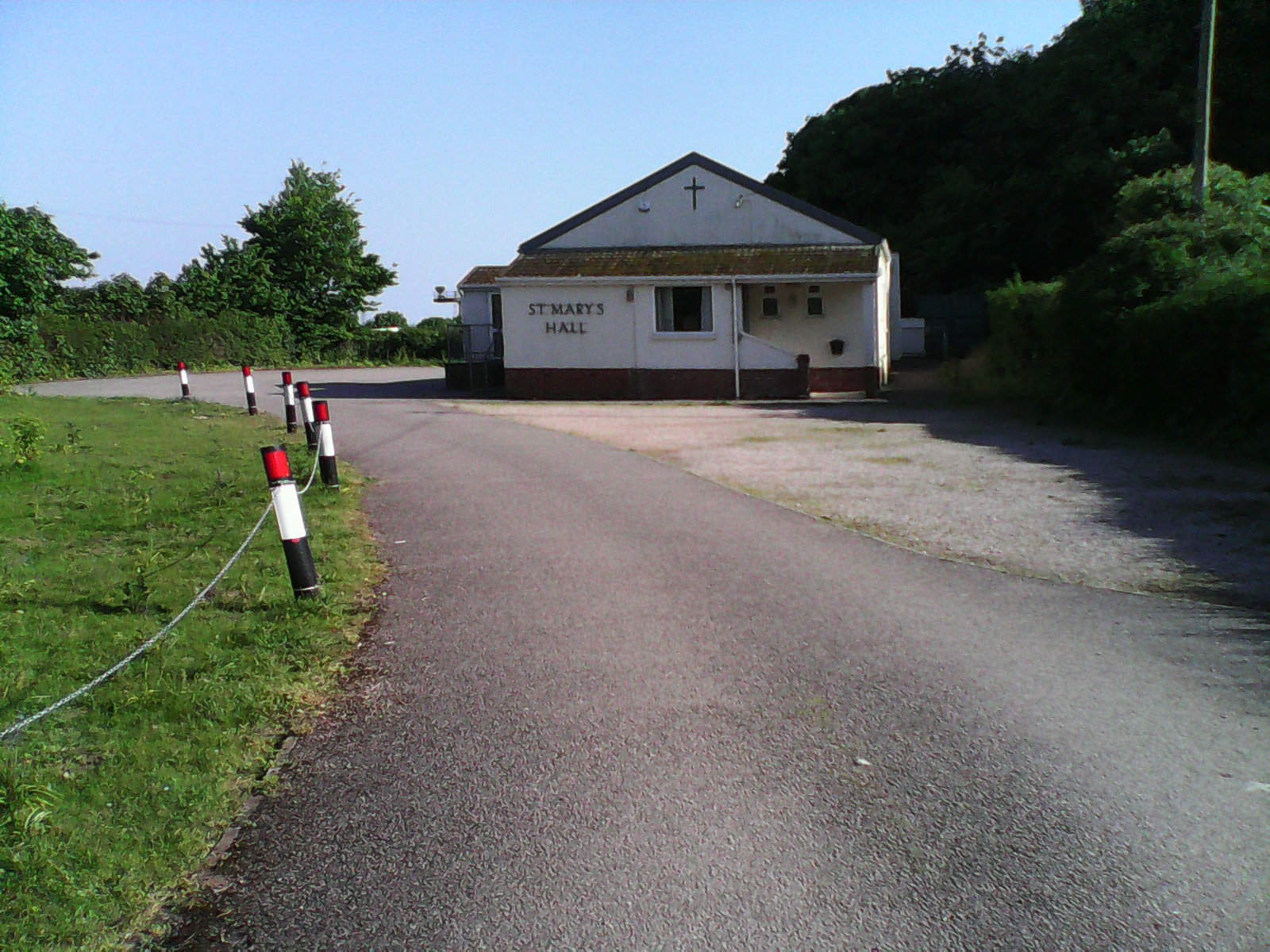
St Mary's Church Hall

Although Dawlish Warren is within the civil parish of Dawlish, it lies in the ecclesiastical parish of Cofton. There is no actual church in Dawlish Warren, but St Mary's Church Hall (St Mary's Church is in Cofton) is located near the resort's railway station. It is used for services and community activities.
