= Dawlish Avoiding Line =

1930s proposed railway development scheme

The Dawlish Avoiding Line was a proposed 1930s railway development scheme for the Great Western Railway's Exeter to Plymouth Line, which if built would have been an alternative to the existing main line route along the South Devon Railway sea wall.

== Background ==
The South Devon Railway Company commissioned Isambard Kingdom Brunel to develop its route between Exeter St Davids to Teignmouth. Having physically surveyed all route options, based on the reason of the substantial cost savings against tunnelling through the steep South Devon hills, Brunel proposed a route that followed the coastline created through a combination of dynamite and quarrying, and where necessary through the construction of a suitable seawall.

The broad gauge railway of 7 ft 1/4 in (2,140 mm) gauge opened on 30 May 1846, designed to be worked as an atmospheric railway, although atmospheric trains only ran from 13 September 1847 until 9 September 1848. The line was extended to Newton Abbot on 31 December 1846.

The South Devon Railway was amalgamated into the Great Western Railway (GWR) on 1 February 1876, and the gauge converted to the 4' 8.5" (1435mm) standard gauge after 20 May 1892. A station was opened to serve Dawlish Warren in 1905, all the other stations on the sea wall having opened with the line in 1846.

== Proposal ==
Due to the substantial high costs of maintenance of the South Devon Railway sea wall – making it the most expensive piece of the GWR's infrastructure to maintain per mile – the Dawlish Avoiding Line was first proposed in 1933, to keep the Exeter to Plymouth Line working.

Whilst the GWR were still investigating the scheme, in light of the continuing effects of the Wall Street crash of 1929 and the subsequent Great Depression, in 1935 as part of his economic redevelopment plan Chancellor of the Exchequer Neville Chamberlain proposed establishing an independent special purpose vehicle finance company for railway development, backed by a government loan guarantee limited to £26.5 million. This could then be drawn down by any of the big four railway companies, with the GWR allocated "eleven fifty-third parts" to support the projects it had submitted for inclusion in the agreement, all of which had to be completed by 1 January 1941. Under the 1935 Finance Act, the GWR initially submitted just one proposal in the Treasury agreement (First Schedule, Part 1, Clause 2) which read: "Construction of a new deviation line from Dawlish Warren to Newton Abbot".

The proposed 16-mile (26 km) 1933 scheme within the two draft 1936 bills, diverted from the existing line south of Exminster. The scheme then went south through Kenton to Dawlish about 1/2 mile (0.80 km) inland, then heading southwest under Holcombe Down avoiding Teignmouth, before rejoining the existing line to the east of Bishopsteignton. It was costed at £3m, and included three short tunnels and one long tunnel of 2,624 yards (2,399 m). Parliament passed the Great Western Railway (Additional Powers) Act 1936, in which the Dawlish Avoiding Line is cited as "Railway No 1" amongst several projects listed.

But, to enable more schemes to be developed, the GWR later proposed a shorter route. Running for 8 miles (13 km), it deviated from the railway bridge over the Hackney Canal near Newton Abbot, and re-joined the main line at a point 62 chains (1.2 km) north of Dawlish Warren towards Cockwood, alongside the River Exe.

However, in 1937 the GWR returned to a scheme closer to the original, called "Railway No 2". Adding a further 7 miles (11 km), it commenced at the same point south of Dawlish on the initial deviation route (authorised earlier by the 1936 Act), terminating close to Exminster at a junction 5 chains (100 m) south of a bridge carrying Milbury Lane over the line.

== Construction ==
The GWR started construction in Spring 1939, with surveyors poles in place along the proposed route by the summer. But after the outbreak of World War II, all work stopped. Work was never restarted, and the GWR was nationalised into British Railways on 1 January 1948. BR subsequently sold the purchased land in the 1950s, and the construction powers of the associated Act of Parliament lapsed in 1999.

== Present ==
The South Devon Railway sea wall—estimated to be the most expensive railway infrastructure to maintain per mile in the United Kingdom—is now owned by Network Rail, and the stations and majority of trains are operated by Great Western Railway.

Since the termination of the LSWR Exeter to Plymouth line during the Beeching Axe, and the blocking of the SDR sea wall route in 2012, 2013, and 150 metres (490 ft) demolition during the storms of Winter 2013–2014, a number of parties have called for reconsideration of construction of the Dawlish Avoiding Line.
