= Exmouth to Starcross Ferry =

Coordinates: 50°37′40″N 3°26′52″W

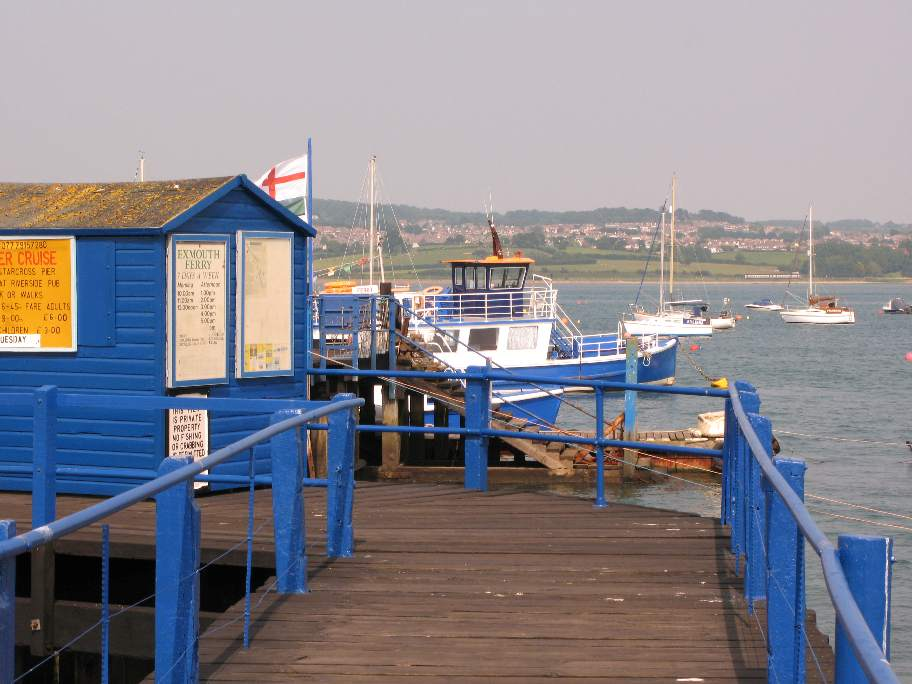
The ferry at Starcross Pier

The Exmouth to Starcross Ferry is a passenger ferry which crosses the mouth of the River Exe in the English county of Devon. It links the port town of Exmouth on the eastern side of the Exe estuary to the village of Starcross on the western side. The ferry is operated by Exe to Sea Cruises.

On the Exmouth side it departs from the ferry steps at Exmouth Marina. On the Starcross side it departs from Starcross Pier, adjacent to Starcross railway station on the Riviera Line. The ferry operates on an hourly basis during the day, from Easter to October, and can accommodate cycles. The operators also run cruises along the Exe estuary and trips around Dawlish Bay.
