= Dawlish Warren railway station =

Railway station in Devon, England

Dawlish Warren
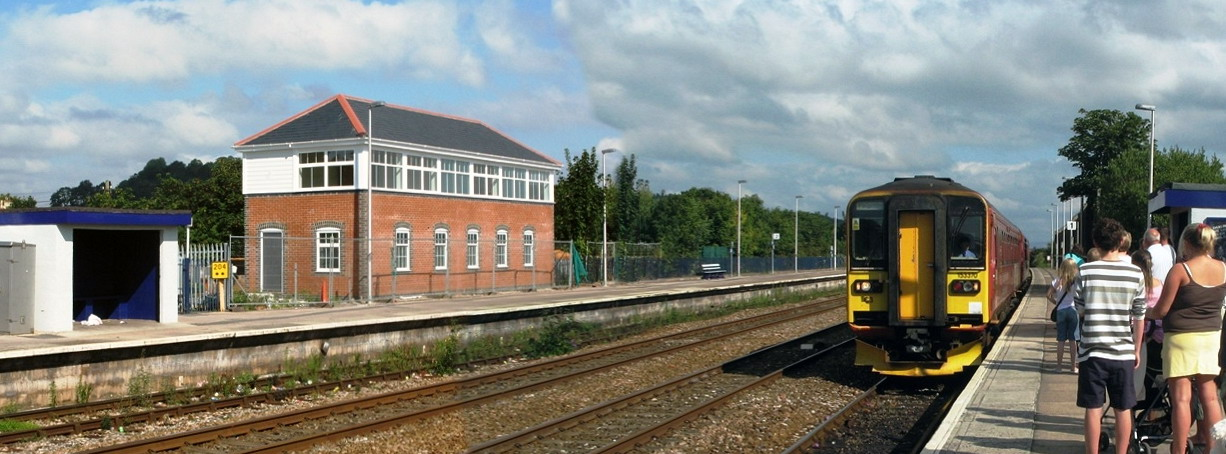

General information
- Location: Dawlish Warren, Teignbridge, England
- Coordinates: 50.5994°N 3.4437°W
- Grid reference: SX979787
- Managed by: Great Western Railway
- Platforms: 2
- Tracks: 4

Other information
- Station code: DWW
- Classification: DfT category F2

History
- Original company: Great Western Railway

Key dates
- 1905: Opened as Warren Halt
- 1911: Renamed Dawlish Warren
- 1912: Resited
- 1 January 1917: Closed
- 5 May 1919: Reopened

Passengers
- 2020/21: ▼88,954
- 2021/22: ▲0.234 million
- 2022/23: ▼0.233 million
- 2023/24: ▲0.243 million
- 2024/25: ▲0.248 million
Location
Notes
- Passenger statistics from the Office of Rail and Road

Dawlish Warren railway station serves the seaside resort and holiday camps of Dawlish Warren, in Devon, England. It is on the Exeter to Plymouth line, 10 miles 46 chains (17.0 km) from Exeter St Davids and 204 miles 37 chains (329.1 km) from London Paddington via Box.

The station is adjacent to the mouth of the River Exe and the Dawlish Warren National Nature Reserve. From here to Teignmouth the railway runs along the South Devon Railway sea wall.

== History ==
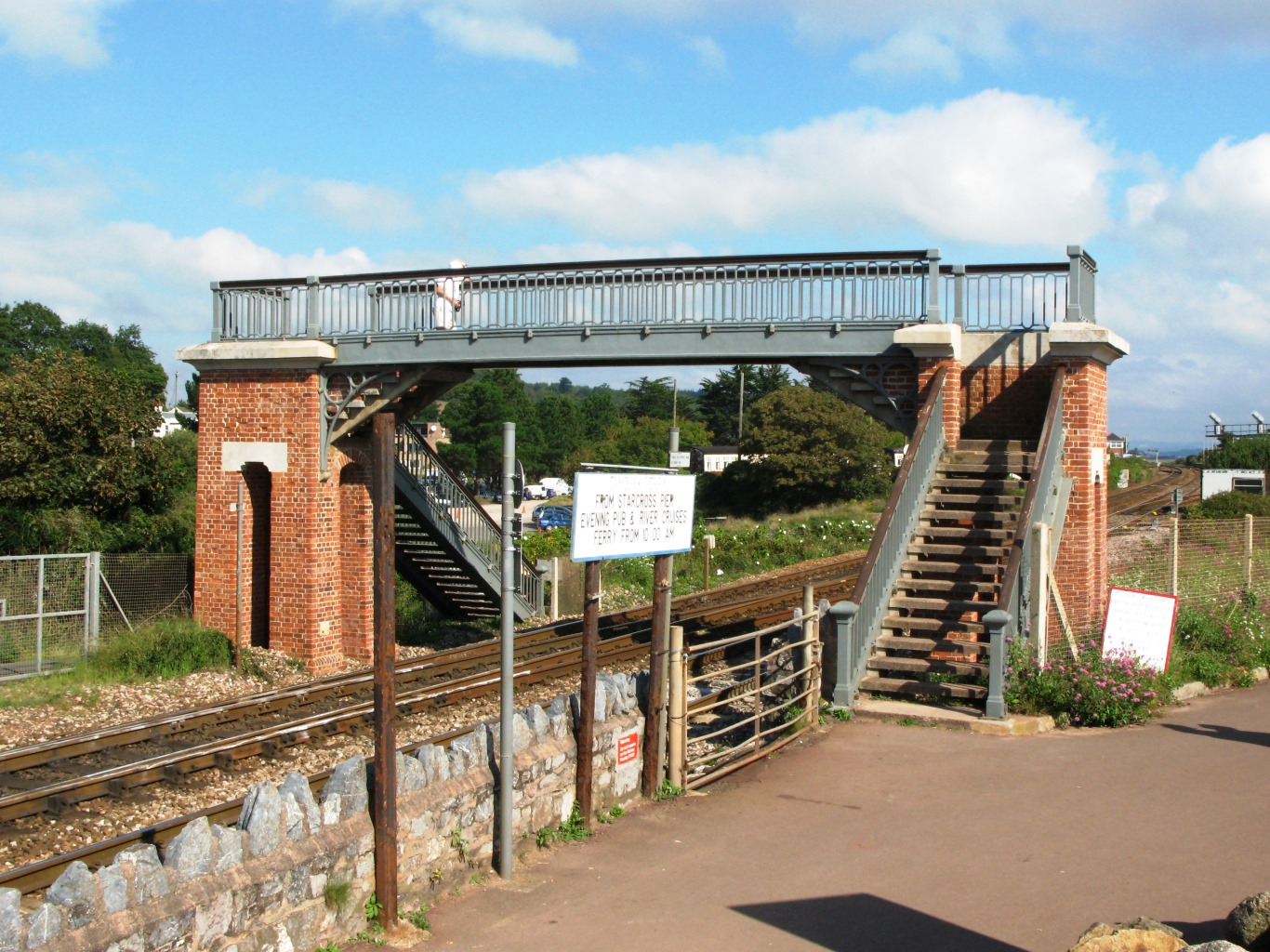
The first footbridge, built in 1873

No station was provided between Starcross and Dawlish until the summer of 1905, when Warren Halt was opened by the Great Western Railway. This was not on the site of the present station, but nearer to the sea wall by the footbridge which had been built across the line in 1873. An iron 'pagoda' waiting shelter was provided on each 150 feet (46 m)-long platform. In 1906, the platforms were extended to 400 feet (120 m). From 1 July 1907, the station was staffed and renamed Warren Platform. It was provided with a booking office and larger waiting room by adding larger iron buildings alongside the original 'pagodas'.

Work soon started on a new station. A goods yard was opened on 10 June 1912 on the landward side of the line and the new station, now 440 yards (400 m) nearer to Starcross, was opened to passengers on 23 September 1912. The platforms were now 600 feet (180 m) long. It had been intended to move the iron buildings from the old platform, but larger wooden buildings were provided instead. Between 1 January 1917 and 5 May 1919, the station was temporarily closed due to World War I. The building on the down platform (nearest the beach) was destroyed by fire on 9 January 1924.

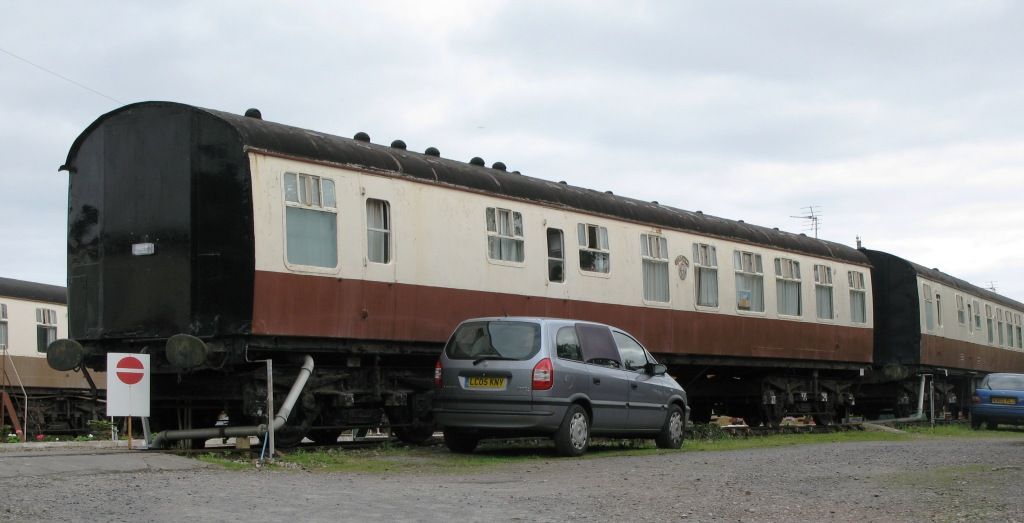
A modern camping coach

In 1935, a camping coach was stationed in the goods yard which could be rented by holiday makers, but the facility was withdrawn in 1939. They were reintroduced by the Western Region in 1952 and, by 1963, there were nine coaches stationed here. After 1964, the public service was withdrawn but the coaches at Dawlish Warren continued to be managed by the British Rail Staff Association for its members. The old coaches were replaced for the 1982 season by the current vehicles, since when the connection to the goods yard has been removed.

The Great Western Railway was nationalised into British Railways on 1 January 1948. Goods traffic was withdrawn on 5 August 1967 and the station became unstaffed on 3 May 1971. From 1974 to 1984, the buildings on the up side housed the Dawlish Warren Railway Museum with its model railway. This building burnt down in 2003, but a new residential building was built on the site in 2007, which is outwardly the same design as the former Dawlish Warren signal box. This had been located at the north end of the down platform, until it became redundant on 14 November 1986 by the West of England resignalling programme; it was demolished in May 1990.

== Platform layout ==
There are four tracks through the station with platforms on the outer pair which allows fast trains to overtake trains stopped at the station. Trains towards Dawlish use the platform nearest the beach, which is only a few yards away.

The station has step-free access to both platforms. A narrow and low bridge beneath the line immediately south of the station allows access between the platforms.

== Services ==
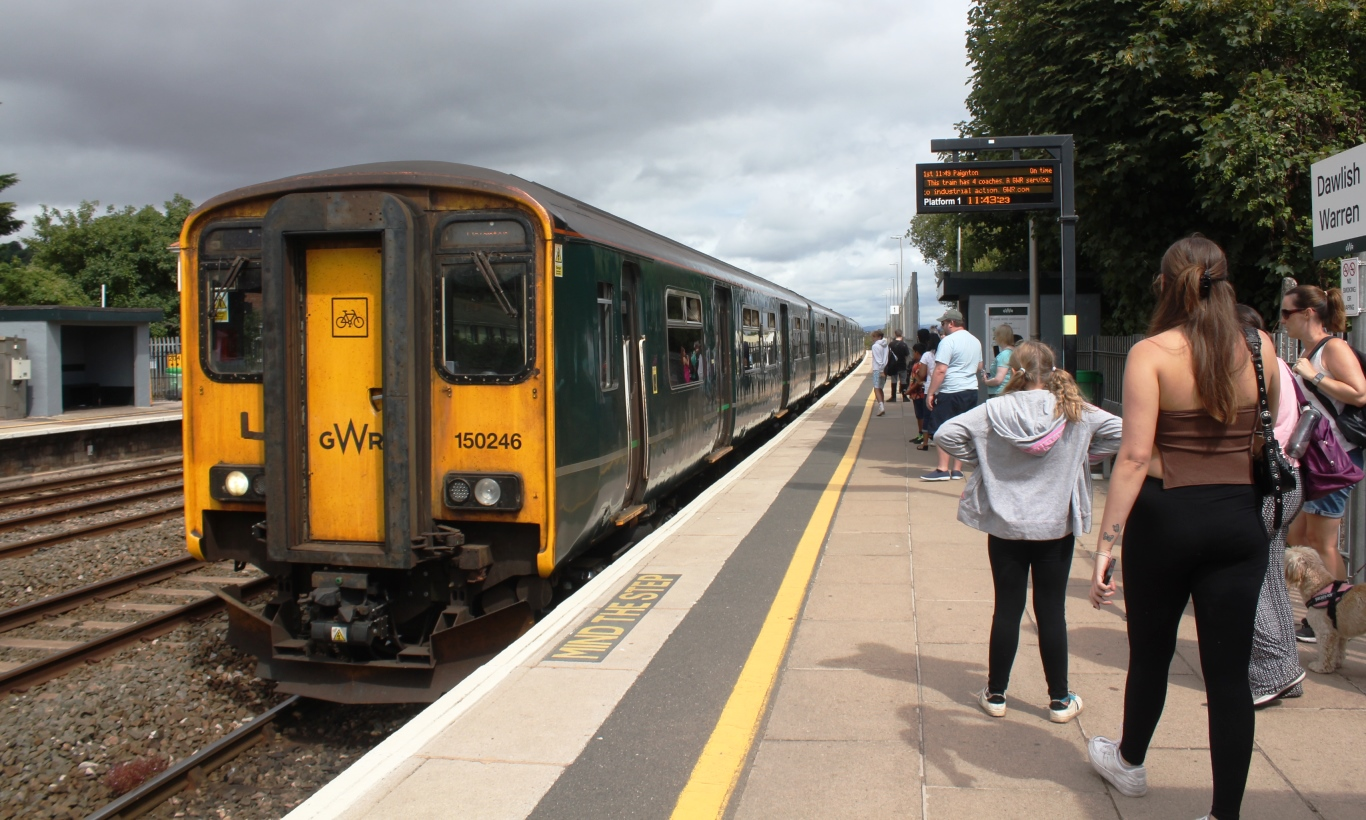
A GWR service to Paignton

Dawlish Warren is served by Great Western Railway trains in both directions on an approximately hourly basis during the day on the Riviera Line. Most trains on Mondays to Saturdays run between Exmouth and Paignton; on Sundays, the service is less frequent and most trains only run between Exeter St Davids and Paignton.

In addition, there is one train per day to each of Bristol Temple Meads, Cardiff Central, Gloucester, London Paddington and Plymouth.

On summer Saturdays, there are three direct services from London Paddington to Paignton that call at Dawlish Warren, with three return services.

| Preceding station | National Rail | Following station |
|---|---|---|
| Dawlish towards Paignton | Great Western Railway Riviera Line | Starcross towards Exeter St Davids |

This station offers access to the South West Coast Path
| Distance to path | 50 yards (46 m) |
| Next station anticlockwise | Starcross 2 miles (3.2 km) |
| Next station clockwise | Dawlish 1.75 miles (2.8 km) |
