= South Devon Railway engine houses =

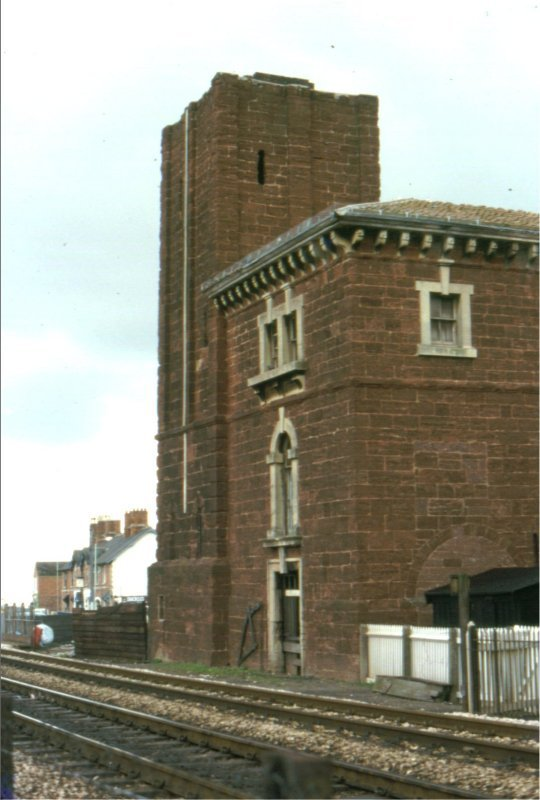
Starcross engine house

The South Devon Railway engine houses were built in Devon, England, to power the atmospheric trains on the South Devon Railway between Exeter St Davids and Plymouth Millbay railway stations. They contained boilers that provided the power to pumps that created the partial vacuum to move the trains. Three of them still stand largely intact alongside the line.

== History ==
The South Devon Railway was built by Isambard Kingdom Brunel who proposed moving the trains by atmospheric power. Brunel and other engineers travelled to Dalkey in Ireland in 1843 to view such a system undergoing tests on the Dublin and Kingstown Railway. There, Brunel's engineer of locomotives for the GWR, Daniel Gooch, calculated that conventional locomotives could work the proposed line at lower cost, but Brunel's concerns about the heavy grades led him to try the system regardless. The South Devon Railway directors agreed on 28 August 1844 to Brunel's proposal to use atmospheric power on their line. Brunel estimated that by reducing the double-track locomotive worked line to a single track atmospheric line a saving of £8,000 per year could be made. Double track lines were favoured at that time even for lightly worked lines as this reduced the chances of a collision between trains, but the atmospheric system precludes the possibility of two trains travelling in opposite directions on the same section of track.

The pipes were ordered from George Hennet, an engineering contractor who worked on many of Brunel's lines. He established a factory at Bridgwater, Somerset, to make them.

The line opened with conventional steam locomotives to Teignmouth on 30 May 1846 and was extended to Newton on 30 December 1846. The first piston carriage (which connected the train to the pipe) was delivered on 25 February 1847 and experimental running with atmospheric power started immediately. Public services were run to Teignmouth from 13 September 1847 and extended to Newton from 10 January 1848. At this time some trains were still worked by locomotives, but from 23 February 1848 all scheduled trains were powered by the atmospheric system.

The leather valve along the top of the pipe tended to dry out and air could then leak in, but this was mitigated slightly by the passing trains spraying water on the leather. The harsh environment of the line, which runs adjacent to the sea for much of its length and is often soaked with salt spray, presented difficulties in maintaining the leather flaps provided to seal the vacuum pipes, which had to be kept supple by being greased with tallow; even so, air leaked in, reducing the pressure difference.

Many trains arrived at Exeter from the Bristol and Exeter Railway very late. Because the South Devon line was only equipped with a telegraph that linked the stations, the engines had to start pumping for when the timetable said that the trains were due to enter their section and then keep pumping until the train eventually passed. This meant that the engines pumped for twice as long as was necessary and meant that much more coke was consumed than would have been the case if pumping had only been undertaken when the train was actually ready to be run. The engine houses were connected to the telegraph system on 2 August 1848 but a lack of trained staff meant that it was not fully used.

The railway company had set up a committee to investigate the efficiency of atmospheric working on 23 May 1848. In August Brunel gave a lengthy report on the system, and discussions with Joseph Samuda were held with a view to making repairs to the valve and guaranteeing its operation. On 29 August 1848 the directors, following Brunel's advice, recommended to the shareholders the suspension of atmospheric working. Atmospheric-powered service thus lasted less than a year, to 9 September 1848; the last engine pumping was at Exeter, where an up goods train arrived in the early hours of 10 September. The engines and buildings were sold to other users, and most of the pipes were sold back to George Hennet for scrap. The atmospheric had cost the railway over £433,000 and about £81,000 was raised from the sales of redundant materials.

Despite the building of engine houses on towards Plymouth and on the Torquay branch the system never expanded beyond Newton. Similarly, the proposal to use the same system on Brunel's Cornwall Railway between Plymouth, Falmouth and Padstow was not pursued.

Three of the engine houses (Starcross, Torquay and Totnes) are still standing and the location of two others (Turf and Dawlish) are clearly visible. A section of the pipe, without the leather covers, is preserved at Didcot Railway Centre mounted on a short section of track which is inclined to show the gradient of the line from Newton to Dainton.

== Technical details ==
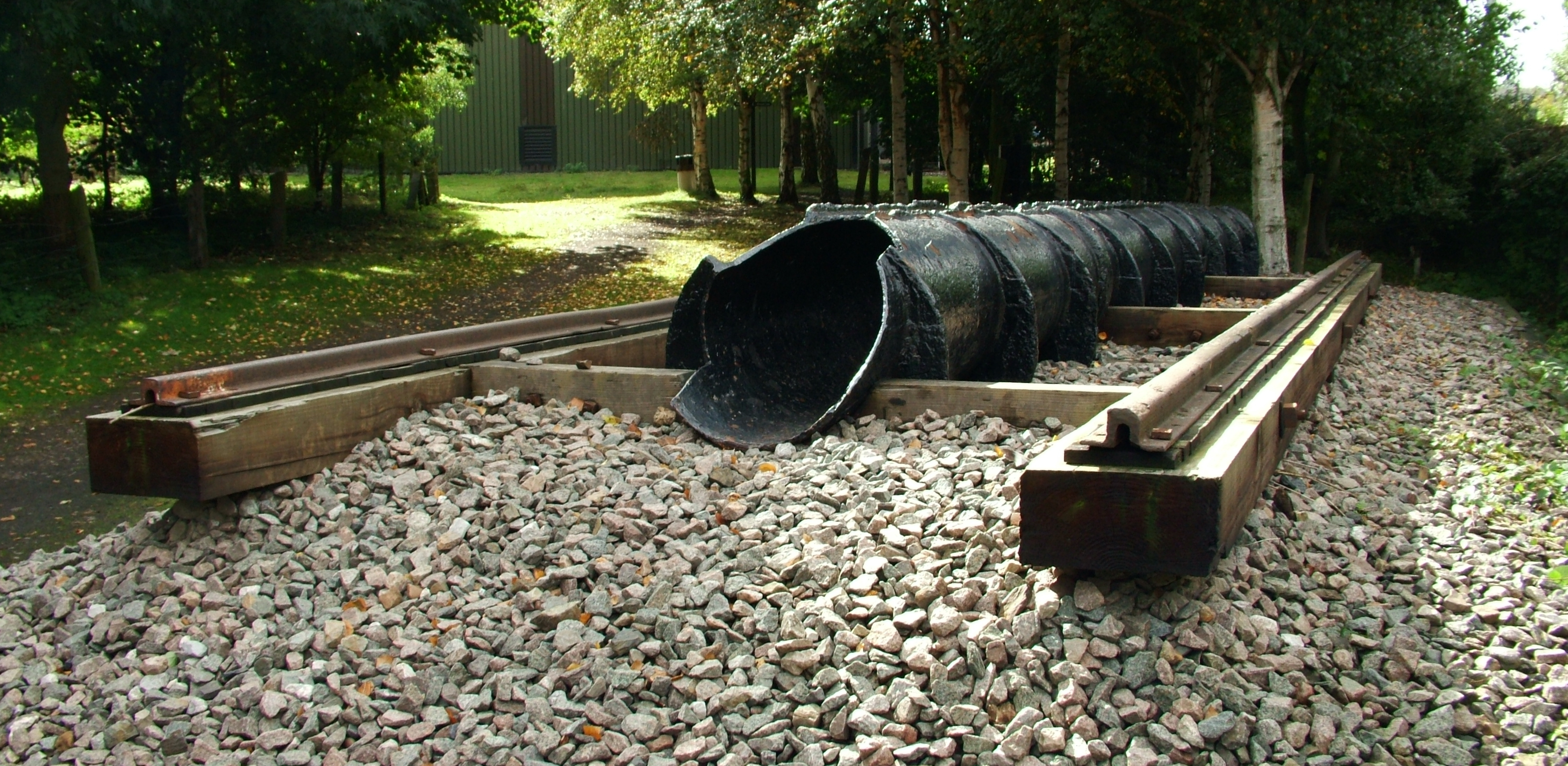
A reconstructed section of atmospheric track at Didcot Railway Centre

The system was designed and patented by the Samuda Brothers. The pipe was laid in 10 feet (3.0 m) sections between the 7 ft (2,134 mm) broad gauge rails with a continuous slot along the top that was sealed by a leather valve.

The buildings that housed the boilers and engines were built in a decorative Italianate style with square chimneys and spaced at around 3 miles (4.8 km) intervals. The 1845 contract for 24 engines comprised sixteen of 33 inch cylinder diameter (approx 45HP), and eight of 12HP, and was split between Boulton and Watt and 'Messrs Rennie', probably J. and G. Rennie. The engine that pumped each section was the one towards which the train was travelling, for example a train leaving Exeter was powered by the Countess Wear engine creating a partial vacuum in the pipe in front of the train which was then propelled forward by the normal atmospheric pressure in the pipe behind the train's piston. Pumping started up to eight minutes before the scheduled departure of the train so as to build up a sufficient vacuum.

At stations a smaller pipe was laid alongside the track and a piston in this was connected to the train by a rope to start it moving. On arrival at the next station it was up to the driver to bring the train to a stop using its brakes. Engine houses were situated at every station except Exeter St Thomas where the driver had to hold the train against the atmospheric pressure with the brakes.

The level portions used 15 inches (381 mm) pipes but the steeper gradients west of Newton were to have used 22 inches (559 mm)pipes. It is not clear how the change between the two pipe sizes would have been achieved unless the piston carriages were changed at Newton. It is also unclear how the level crossing at Turf was operated as the pipe projected some way above the rails.

Speeds of up to 70 mph (112 km/h) were achieved, but service speeds were usually around 40 mph (64 km/h). The timetable allowed 55 minutes for the 20 miles (32 km) journey, but records show that 36% of trains arrived more than five minutes early, some by more than ten minutes.

== Engine house remains ==
=== Turf ===
The remains of Turf engine house can be seen on the river side of the line just where the railway comes alongside the River Exe near Turf Lock, the entrance to the Exeter Canal.

The square pond surrounded by trees on the river side of the line was the main water reservoir. Just to the south of this, the foundations of some buildings can be seen. This was where the engine house itself was built, although some of the foundations are from later alterations. The building was demolished about 1860 and the stone used in a nearby farm.

=== Starcross ===
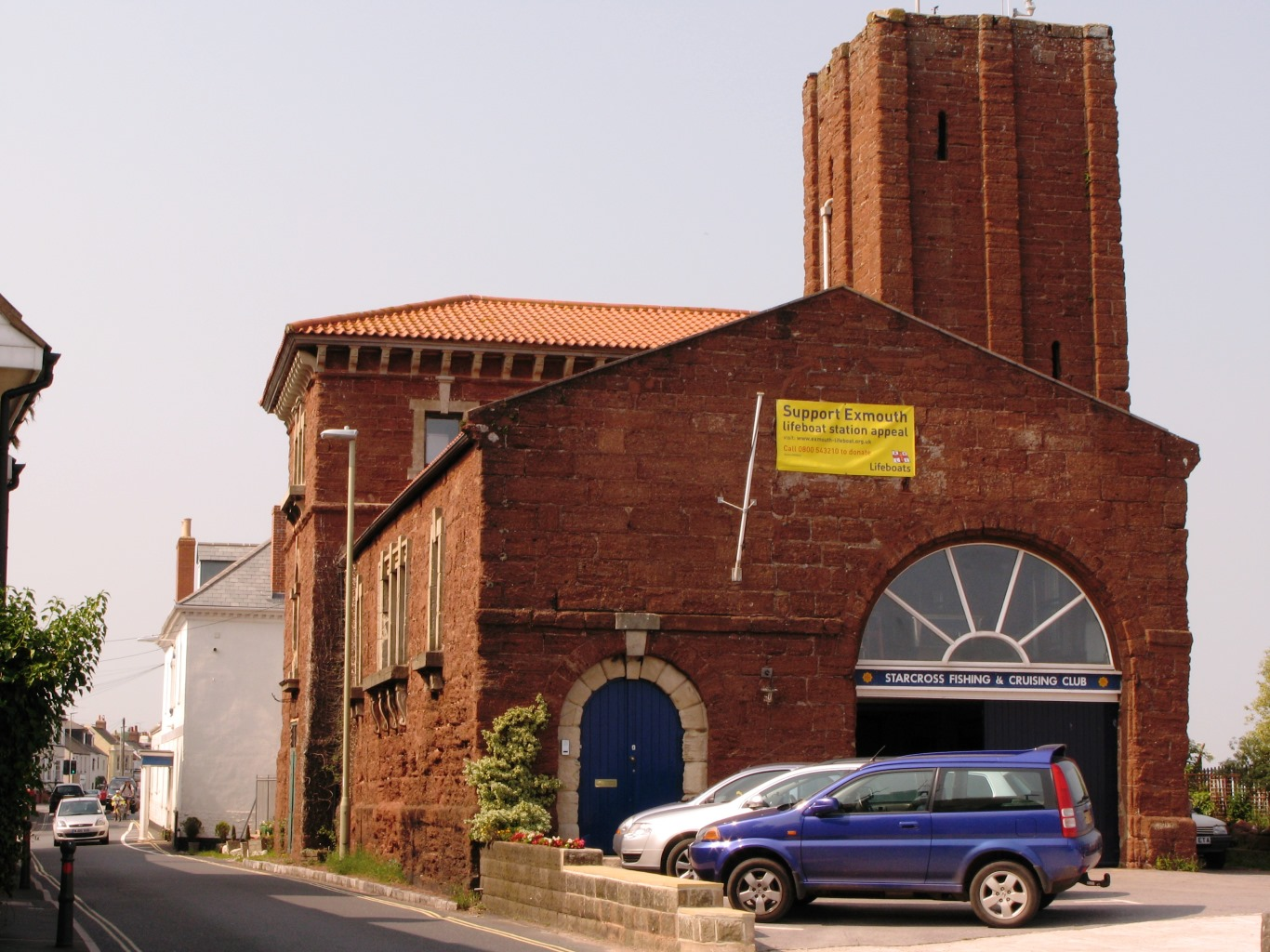
Starcross

The most familiar engine house, and the most intact one which actually saw service, is situated on the landward side of the line at the south end of Starcross railway station. The chimney, reduced in height for safety many years ago, had for a while a new pitched roof, but it has since been removed. Unlike the other engine houses this one is built of Heavitree stone from Exeter, a coarse red sandstone that has not weathered well. The accompanying photograph from 2007 shows the original wall along the narrow street called The Strand, but within the next decade it had to be rebuilt with a concrete surface painted to resemble stones.

After the engines ceased work, the boiler house was used by coal merchants until 1981. The engine area was used as a Wesleyan Church from 1867 to 1958, after which it was used as a youth club for a few years. The whole building was sold and reopened as a museum for the atmospheric railway in 1982. This has since closed and the building was developed internally for use by the local Starcross Fishing and Cruising Club.

=== Dawlish ===
Although largely demolished in 1873, part of the engine house wall can be seen at the back of Dawlish railway station car park.

=== Torquay ===
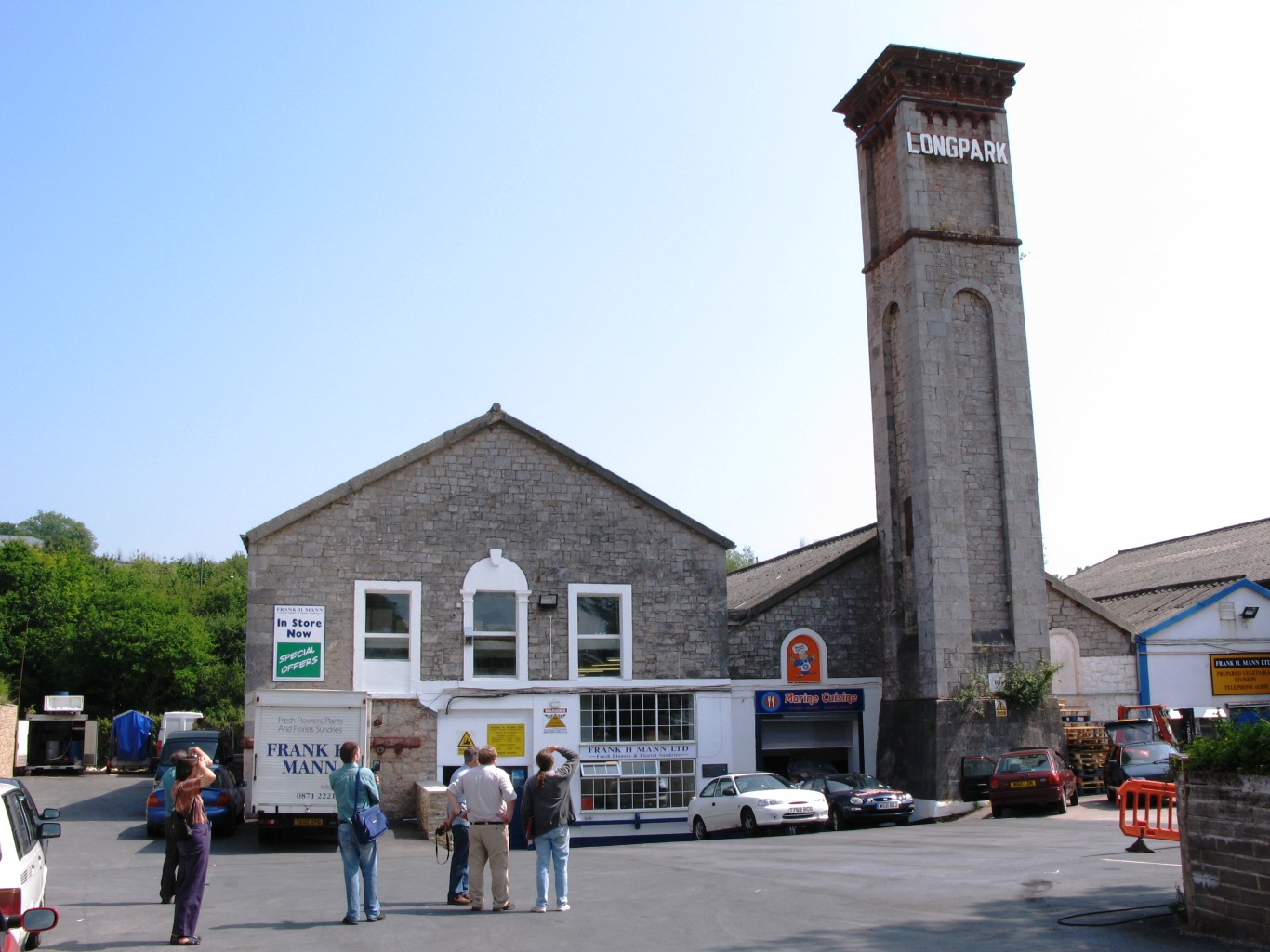
Torquay

By the time the railway opened to Torquay the decision had already been made to abandon atmospheric working, so this engine house was never used. However it was completed and is the surviving example with the least amount of exterior modification. It is also the one least easy to see from trains; it is about 1 mile (1.6 km) on the Newton Abbot side of Torre (on the right hand side of the line approaching from Newton Abbot) but is on a higher level above the line. It can be more easily viewed from a supermarket car park in Newton Road. The location so far from the terminal but uphill from it shows that southbound trains were intended to run the last mile by gravity.

From the 1880s until 1957 the building was occupied by the Longpark Pottery. A fictionalised version of the pottery is described in Eden Philpotts' novel Brunel's Tower.

=== Totnes ===
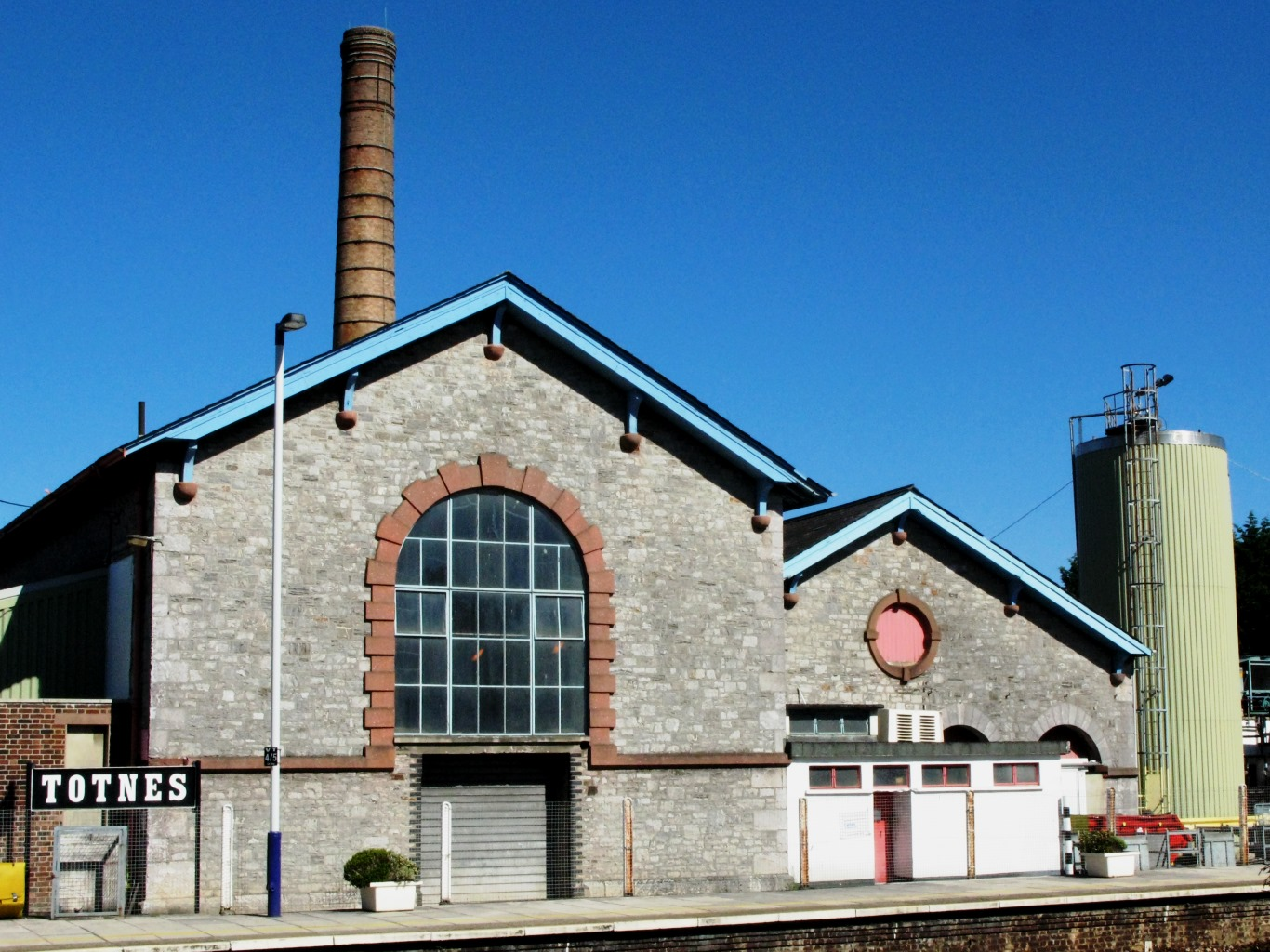
Totnes

The engine house adjacent to Totnes railway station was never brought into use. It was converted for use as a milk processing plant for Dairy Crest but this has since closed. The original chimney, still present in a photograph of 1925, was removed many years ago.
