= Hackney Marshes, Devon =

Nature reserve in Devon, England

Coordinates: 50°32′27″N 3°35′29″W

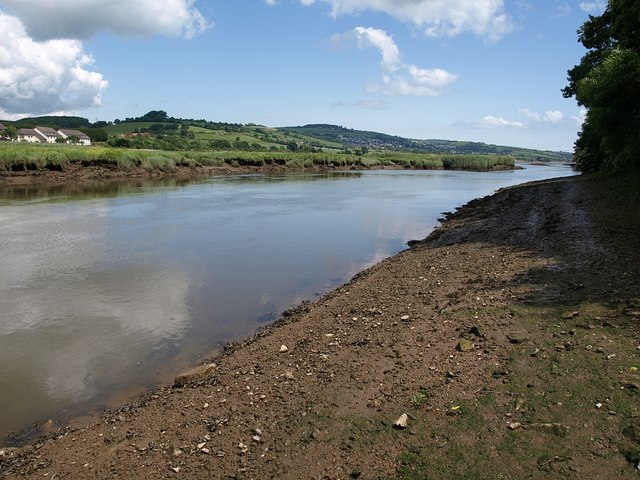
River Teign taken from Templar Way

Hackney Marshes is a local nature reserve in Devon, England. It comprises a low-lying area of flood meadows located at the head of the Teign Estuary by Kingsteignton.

== History ==
In the Middle Ages the area was used for archery practice. It was later developed as a transport route for clay excavated from sites in Chudleigh Knighton, Preston and Kingsteignton areas, which were in full production from the 1700s. Clay was initially transported from the pits by packhorse to the nearest port; Teignmouth. However, in 1843 Lord Clifford, owner of the Hackney Marshes land, developed the Hackney Canal between the hamlet of Hackney and Newton Abbot. The development included building a tidal lock capable of holding two barges, making is possible for clay to be stored in clay cellars in Hackney, where it was then loaded onto barges to be carried to Teignmouth. 16 cellars with the capacity to store 7,000 tons of clay were built to store the clay in transit.

The hamlet is no longer populated, with the ruins on the border of the nature reserve. The only remaining building in use is the Passage House Inn, built in 1761. There has reportedly been a country pub or inn on the site since pre-Roman times, situated on the site of a former tidal ford; the passage way across the River Teign, giving rise to the name the Passage House. The canal ceased to be active as a trading route in 1928.

== Wildlife and environment ==
As a local nature reserve, the marsh is a habitat for various wildlife species. There are often sightings of birds of prey such as buzzards and kestrels, for the latter of which the marsh is an important nest site. Additionally there are pheasants, and herons, mallards, moorhens, kingfishers, and the rare Cetti's warbler and cirl bunting line the waterway. The wildflower meadows and pond sites attract butterflies, dragonflies, and damselflies, including the emerald damselfly as a Devon rarity. There are also a variety of mice and vole species, as well as larger mammals such as badgers and foxes. The woodland comprises oak, alder, ash, and willow.
