= Dawlish railway station =

Railway station in Devon, England

Dawlish
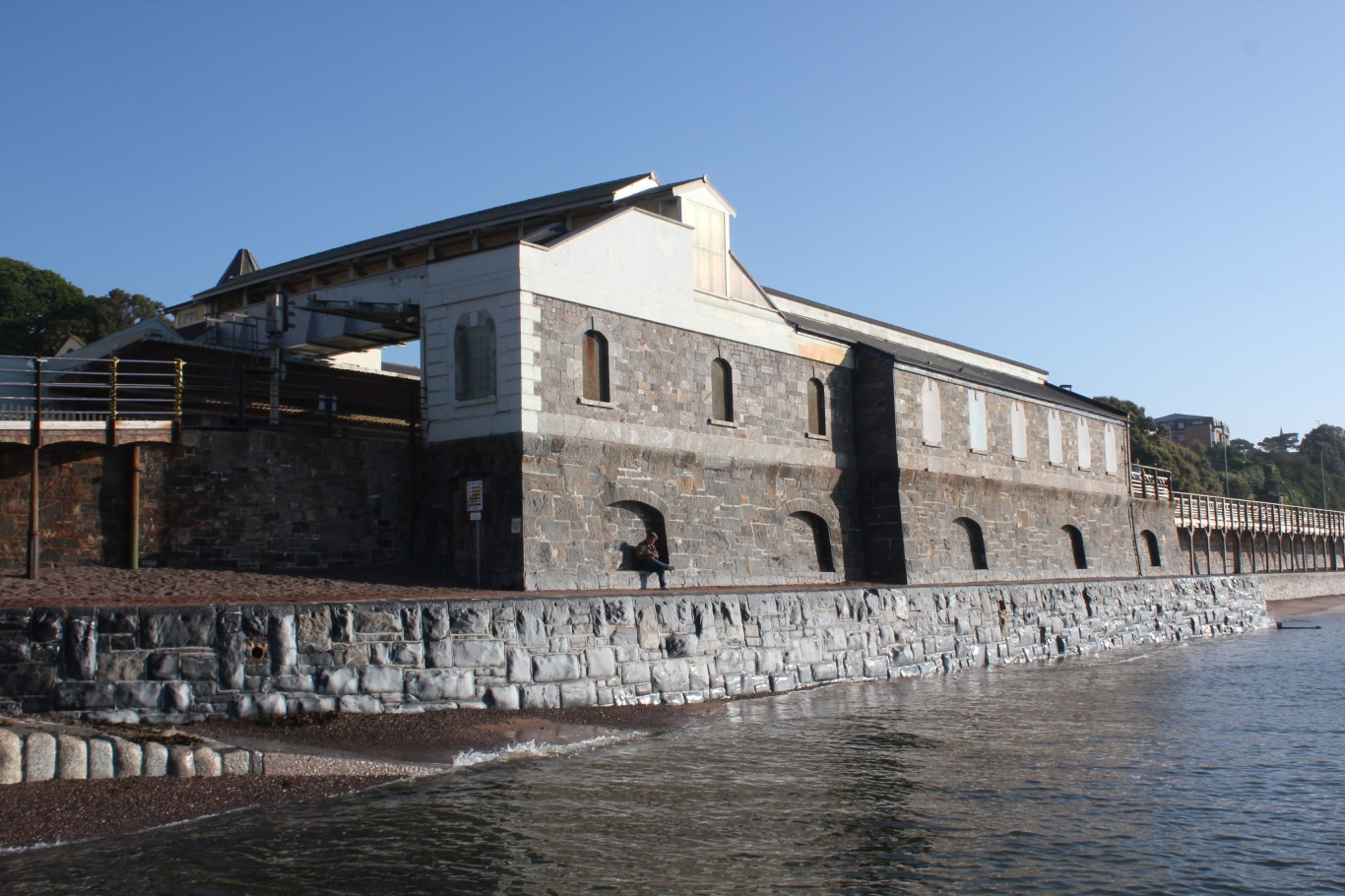
- Dawlish station seen from the beach in 2018, before the sea wall was raised to platform level

General information
- Location: Dawlish, Teignbridge, Devon, England
- Coordinates: 50.5805°N 3.4645°W
- Grid reference: SX964766
- Manager: Great Western Railway
- Platforms: 2

Other information
- Station code: DWL
- Classification: DfT category D

History
- Original company: South Devon Railway
- Pre-grouping: Great Western Railway
- Post-grouping: Great Western Railway

Key dates
- Opened: 1846
- Rebuilt: 1875

Passengers
- 2021/22: ▲0.481 million
- 2022/23: ▲0.511 million
- 2023/24: ▲0.535 million
- 2024/25: ▲0.581 million
- 2025/26: ▲0.608 million

Listed Building – Grade II
- Feature: Dawlish railway station
- Designated: 17 July 1951
- Reference no.: 1096669
Location
Notes
- Passenger statistics from the Office of Rail and Road

Dawlish railway station serves the seaside resort town of Dawlish, in Devon, England. It is on the Exeter to Plymouth line at milepost 206 from London Paddington.

The station opened in 1846 but the main buildings date from 1875. It is built on the sea wall, as is the railway line, and has often suffered from storm damage due its proximity to the sea. South of the station, the railway passes through five tunnels in the cliffs as it follows the coastline.

== History ==
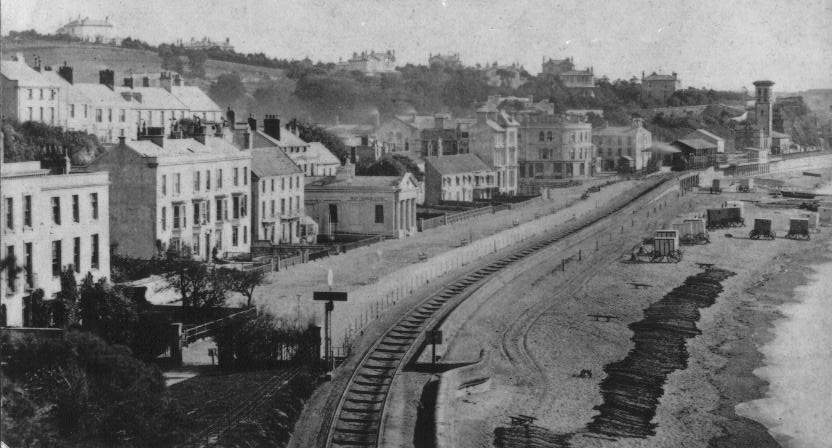
Dawlish in the 1870s, with the station and chimney for the atmospheric pumping engine in the right background

The station was opened by the South Devon Railway on 30 May 1846. The wall with bricked up windows that can be seen in the car park is the remains of the engine house that used to power the trains while they were worked by atmospheric power from 13 September 1847 until 9 September 1848. At this time, it was one of Isambard Kingdom Brunel's 7 ft (2,134 mm) broad gauge railways.

The station initially had just one platform on the landward side with a loop line closer to the sea, but a second platform was added to serve the loop line on 1 May 1858. The original wooden station and train shed burnt down on 14 August 1873. The South Devon Railway built a new station with the platforms connected by an iron bridge, roofed with glass. The principal buildings were constructed adjoining Station Road, and the booking office was fitted with pitch pine cornice and fittings. Star gas pendent lights were installed and a lift for taking up luggage to the platform levels. The first class waiting rooms were furnished with Brussels carpets and polished oak furniture. The contractor was Blatchford and Son of Tavistock and the cost was £4,000 (equivalent to £400,000 in 2025). The new station was opened on 12 April 1875.

An unusual feature of the section of line running towards Teignmouth was the sudden 'dip' in the track that once existed, resulting from the demand by a local resident who did not wish to lose his view of the sea.

The South Devon Railway was amalgamated into the Great Western Railway on 1 February 1876 and the line was converted to 4 ft 8 1/2 in (1,435 mm) standard gauge on 20 May 1892. The Great Western, in turn, was nationalised into British Railways on 1 January 1948.

In 1937, the main span of the footbridge was rebuilt using girders removed from Park Royal & Twyford Abbey tube station in London. This was replaced again in 2013.

The platforms have been extended several times to cope with the crowds and now nearly reach Coastguards' Footbridge, although the Exeter platform was shortened again in 1970. The decorative iron and glass canopies above the platforms were replaced by concrete beams and glass panels in 1961, but the glass has since been replaced by perspex. Goods traffic was withdrawn on 17 May 1965.

After a major storm in 2014 washed out the track bed and made an 80 m (260 ft) breach in the sea wall north of the station, plans were developed to reinforce and replace the sea wall around the station area. This work, which was expected to cost £80 million, started in 2020 and was largely completed in late summer 2022. During this time, the sea wall walkway was raised to platform level and both platforms were resurfaced. The platform lighting was also improved. An accessible footbridge, built to replace the previous at-grade crossing for passengers who can't use stairs, opened on 15 March 2024.

=== Signal boxes ===
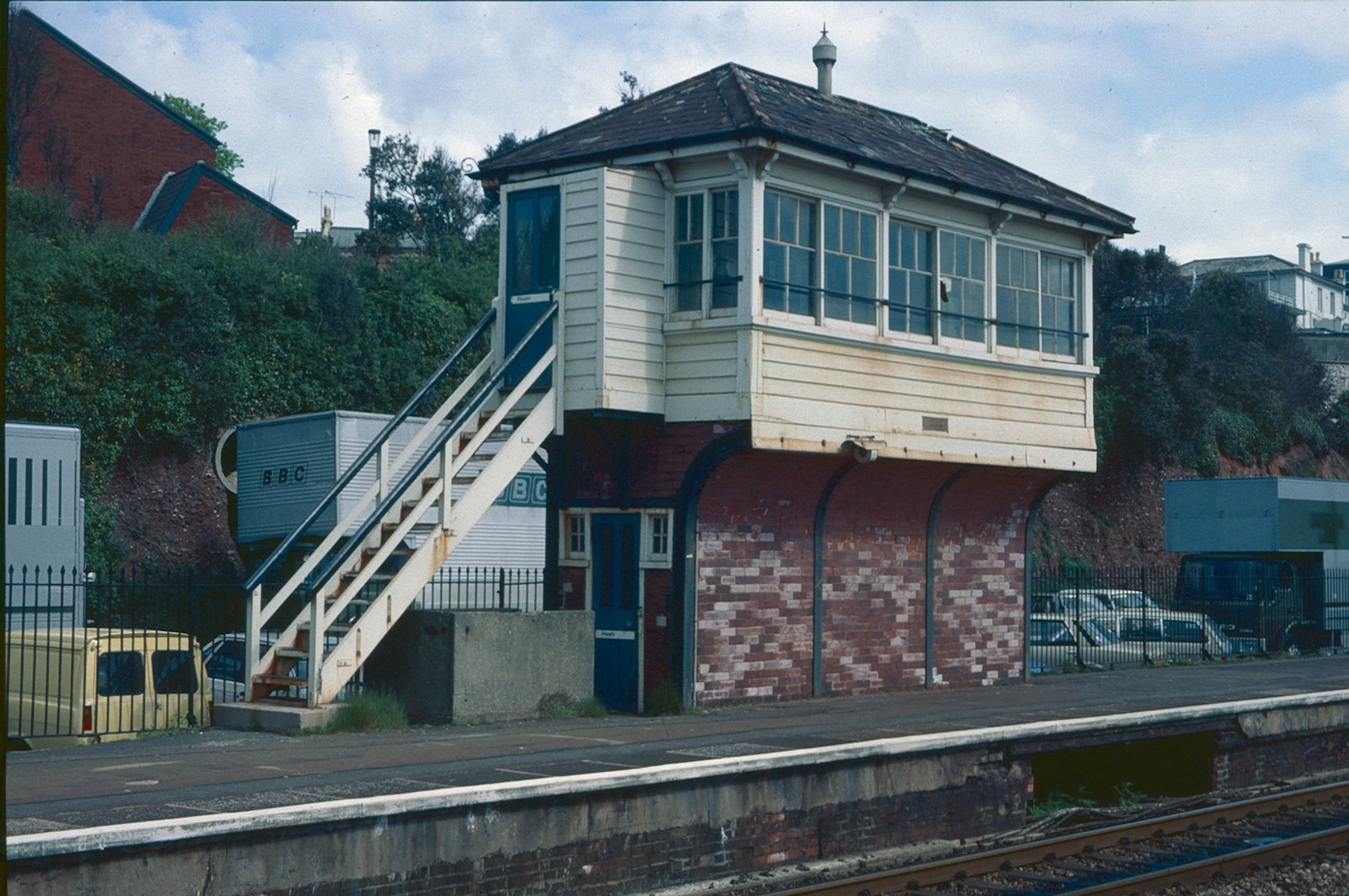
The 1920 signal box

The first signal box was provided on the seaward platform, beside the north end of the waiting room, but this was replaced by a new two-storey signal box on 9 September 1920 on the opposite platform. So as to fit on the narrow platform, the brick-built lower storey, which contained the interlocking equipment, was narrower than usual, with the upper storey was vaulted out from this to give a full size operating floor.

After the summer of 1970, the signal box was only opened on summer weekends or if there were problems working along the sea wall. It finally closed on 27 September 1986, since when the trains have been controlled from Exeter. Despite attempts to find a commercial use for the redundant building, it remained empty until 2013 when it was demolished during the period 2–5 July.

=== 1921 accident ===
On 22 September 1921, a Plymouth Millbay to Crewe passenger train collided with a Exeter St Davids to Newton Abbot goods train that was shunting in the station. The passenger train, hauled by Star Class 4055 Princess Sophia, failed to stop at a danger signal. Cranes cleared the line by lifting damaged wagons onto the beach, where they remained for a couple of days.

== Description ==
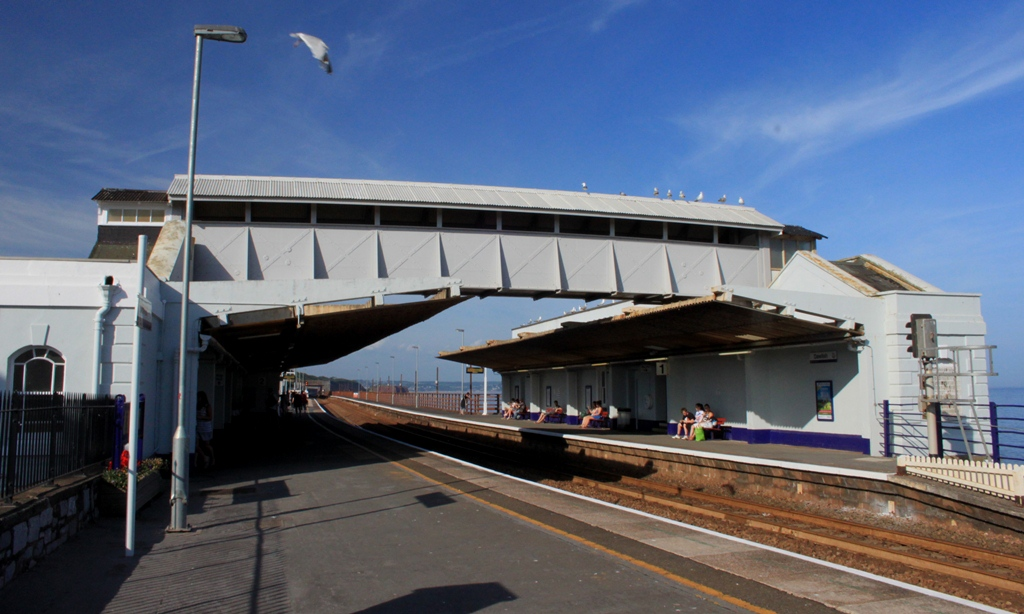
View from the south end of the platform

Dawlish is 206 miles 7 chains (331.7 km) from London Paddington via Box Tunnel, and 10 mi 15 ch (16.4 km; 10.19 mi) from Exeter St Davids.

The station is adjacent to the beach near the gardens at the centre of the town. The main frontage is in banded rusticated masonry. The remaining walls are rendered except for the east elevation, which faces the sea, which is in rubble stone. The station buildings are Grade II listed buildings. It has two storeys, as the railway runs above street level, and a café occupies most of the street frontage. The main entrance is at road level on the side served by trains to Exeter St Davids. This opens onto a booking office with an ornate ceiling.

Access to the opposite platform is provided via a covered footbridge, with its stairways enclosed within the station building. A second fully accessible footbridge, equipped with lifts, is situated adjacent to the car park. This removed the need for the former barrow crossing at the south end of the station, which has since been closed.

Immediately to the south of the station is the low Colonnade Viaduct, which carries the railway above the small river that runs through the gardens and the main footpath from the town to the beach and the South West Coast Path. To the north of the station is Coastguards Footbridge, with Coastguards Cottage, now a café, on the hill above the line to the west, with Brunel's Boat House between the line and the beach to the east.

== Services ==
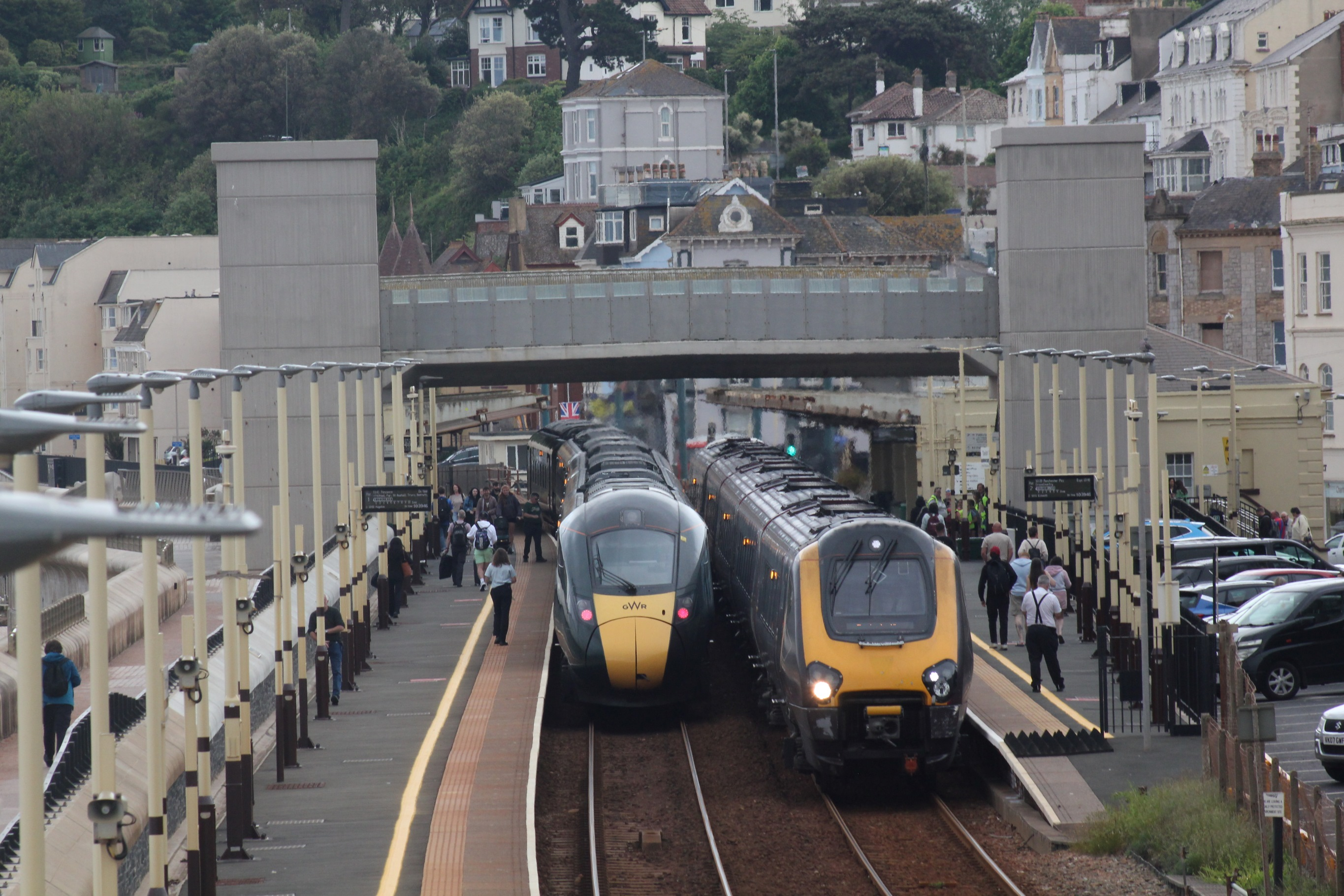
GWR (left) and CrossCountry (right) services calling at Dawlish

Dawlish is served by four routes:

- Great Western Railway (GWR) operates a regular service between Exmouth and Paignton, the route being branded the 'Riviera Line'. These call approximately half-hourly in each direction throughout the day; on Sundays, the service is less frequent and many trains only run between Exeter St Davids and Paignton.
- GWR runs services between Cardiff Central, Bristol Temple Meads, Plymouth and Penzance, a few of which stop here.
- GWR also runs services between London Paddington and Paignton or Plymouth and Penzance, a few of which stop here.
- CrossCountry operates two services per day in each direction between Manchester Piccadilly and Paignton that stop at Dawlish.

Preceding station	National Rail	Following station
Teignmouth towards	Great Western Railway (Riviera Line)	Dawlish Warren towards
Teignmouth	CrossCountry (Paignton-Manchester)	Exeter St Davids

== Cultural impact ==
Simon Jenkins included in his 2017 book of the best 100 stations in Britain.

Trains running through Dawlish feature in the opening credits of The System, a 1964 film. Other scenes show trains at Churston and Brixham.

This station offers access to the South West Coast Path
Distance to path	50 yards (46 m)
Next station anticlockwise	Dawlish Warren 1.75 miles (2.82 km)
Next station clockwise	Teignmouth 3 miles (4.8 km)
