= Starcross railway station =

Railway station in Devon, England

Starcross
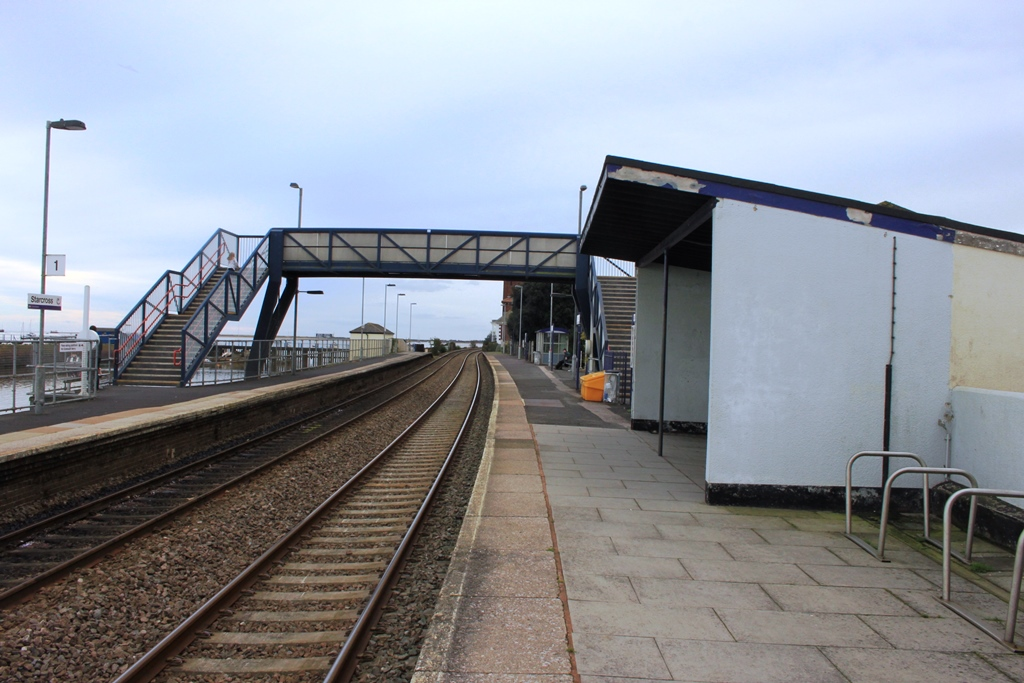
- View from the north

General information
- Location: Starcross, Teignbridge, Devon, England
- Coordinates: 50.628°N 3.448°W
- Grid reference: SX976819
- Managed by: Great Western Railway
- Platforms: 2

Other information
- Station code: SCS
- Classification: DfT category F2

History
- Original company: South Devon Railway
- Pre-grouping: Great Western Railway
- Post-grouping: Great Western Railway

Key dates
- Opened: 30 May 1846

Passengers
- 2020/21: ▼38,644
- 2021/22: ▲90,972
- 2022/23: ▲107,120
- 2023/24: ▲112,584
- 2024/25: ▼107,218
Location
Notes
- Passenger statistics from the Office of Rail and Road

Starcross is a small station on the Exeter to Plymouth line in the village of Starcross, Devon, England. It is 8 miles 44 chains (13.8 km) down the line from Exeter St Davids and 202 miles 36 chains (325.8 km) from London Paddington, via Box. The station is managed by Great Western Railway, which operates all trains serving it. One of the South Devon Railway engine houses, which formerly powered the trains on this line, is situated alongside the station.

== History ==
The South Devon Railway opened the station on 30 May 1846. It only had a single platform at this time, the second one being added in November 1848. It was provided with a train shed until 1906 when the station was rebuilt.

The station became unstaffed on 3 May 1971 and the old station building was finally demolished in 1981. The footbridge, which had been erected in 1895, was replaced by the present structure in 1999.

== Platform layout and facilities ==
Access to the platform for trains towards Exeter is up a few steps from the main A379 road through the village; the platform for trains towards Dawlish is reached by a footbridge.

There is a waiting shelter on the platform for trains to Exeter but the other side is open to the elements.

The platform for trains to Paignton also serves as the access to the pier used by the Starcross to Exmouth Ferry, which forms a link in the South West Coast Path. It operates on an hourly basis during the day, from Easter to October.

== Services ==
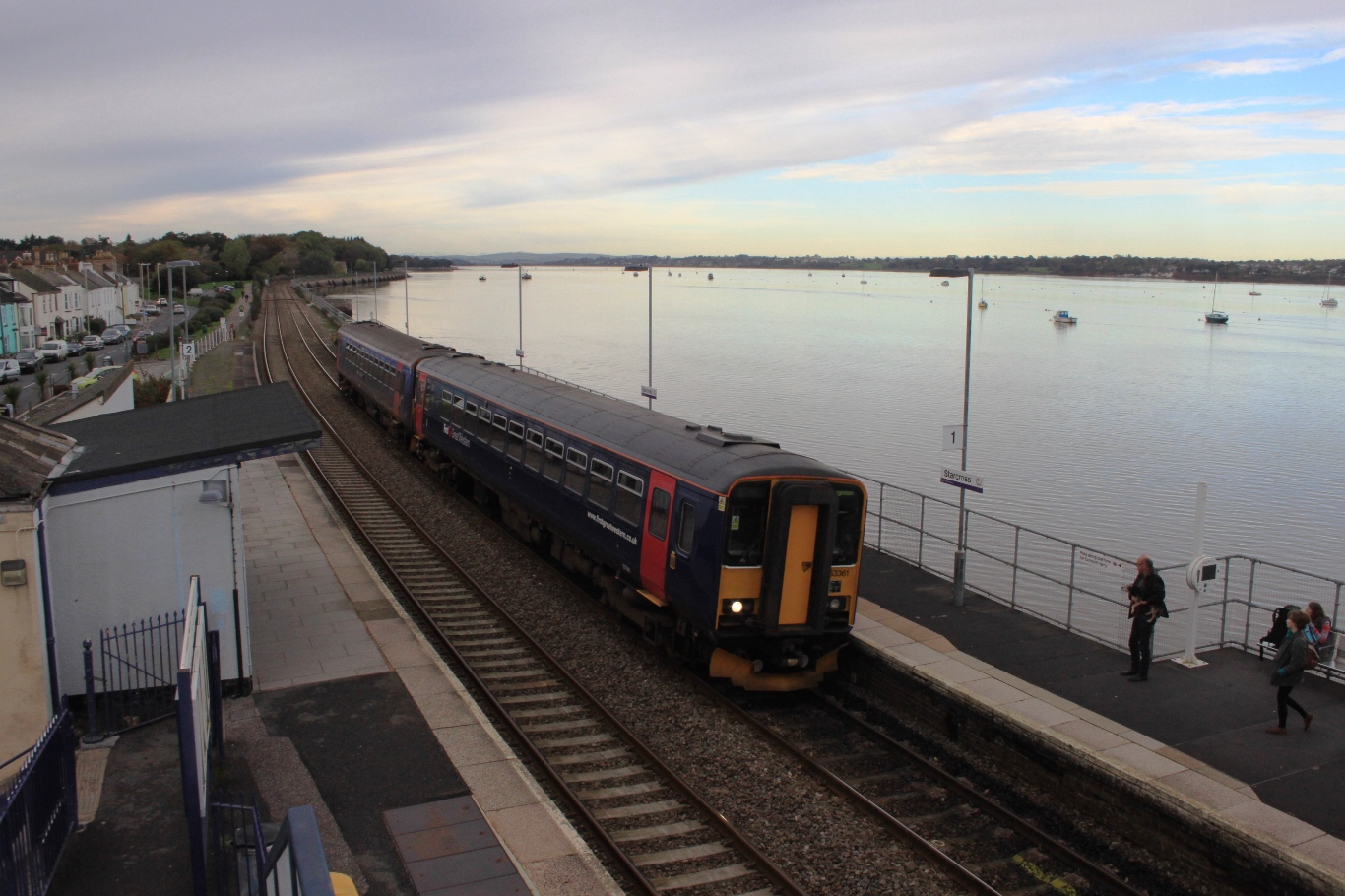
Great Western Railway Class 153s arriving from Exeter

Starcross is served by Great Western Railway trains in both directions on an approximately hourly basis during the day (with extras at peak periods). Most trains run between Exmouth and Paignton; on Sundays the service is less frequent and most trains only run between Exeter St Davids and Paignton. The route from Exeter St Davids through Starcross to Paignton is marketed as the "Riviera Line".

A few trains run from Bristol to Plymouth and beyond, otherwise passengers travelling east or north change into main line trains at St Davids or at Newton Abbot if travelling westwards.

There is one direct service in the morning to London Paddington with a return service in the evening. These services operate Mondays to Fridays only. The morning service to London runs via Bristol and the evening return runs via the Reading to Taunton line.

Preceding station	National Rail	Following station
Dawlish Warren towards Paignton	Great Western Railway Riviera Line	Marsh Barton towards Exeter St Davids
Ferry services
Terminus	Exmouth to Starcross ferry (seasonal)	Exmouth Marina

This station offers access to the South West Coast Path
Distance to path	0 yards
Next station anticlockwise	Exmouth 0.5 miles (0.80 km) (plus ferry)
Next station clockwise	Dawlish Warren 2 miles (3.2 km)
