= Teignmouth railway station =

Railway station in Devon, England

Teignmouth
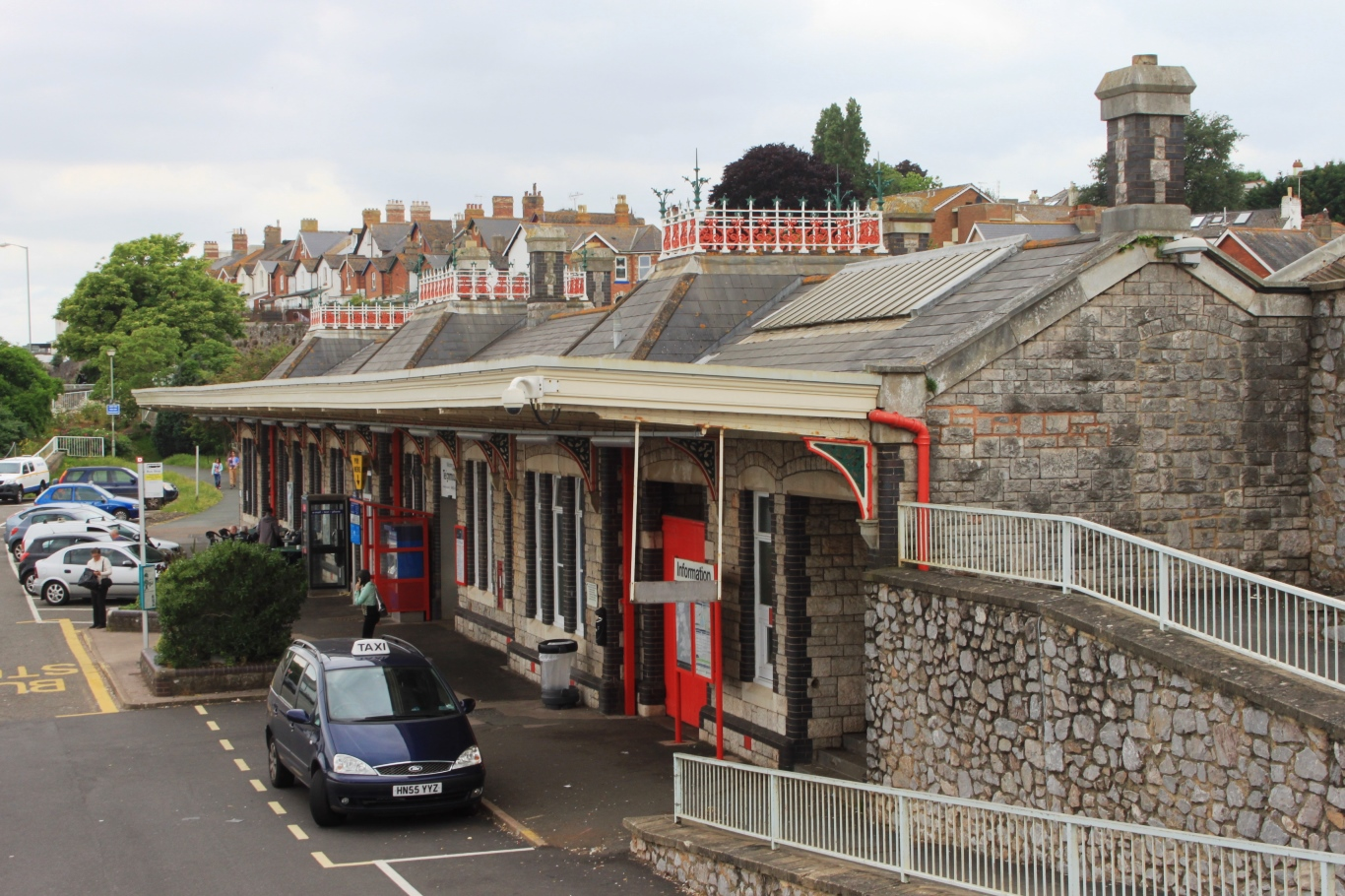

General information
- Location: Teignmouth, Teignbridge, Devon, England
- Coordinates: 50.548°N 3.495°W
- Grid reference: SX942731
- Manager: Great Western Railway
- Platforms: 2

Other information
- Station code: TGM
- Classification: DfT category D

History
- Original company: South Devon Railway
- Pre-grouping: Great Western Railway
- Post-grouping: Great Western Railway

Key dates
- Opened: 1846
- Rebuilt: 1895

Passengers
- 2021/22: ▲0.607 million
- 2022/23: ▲0.691 million
- 2023/24: ▲0.728 million
- 2024/25: ▲0.761 million
- 2025/26: ▲0.774 million
Location
Notes
- Passenger statistics from the Office of Rail and Road

Teignmouth railway station serves the seaside town of Teignmouth, in Devon, England. It is on the Exeter to Plymouth line, 208 miles 70 chains (336 km) from London Paddington, via Box. The station is managed by Great Western Railway and is the third-busiest station on the Riviera Line after Exeter St Davids and Newton Abbot.

== History ==
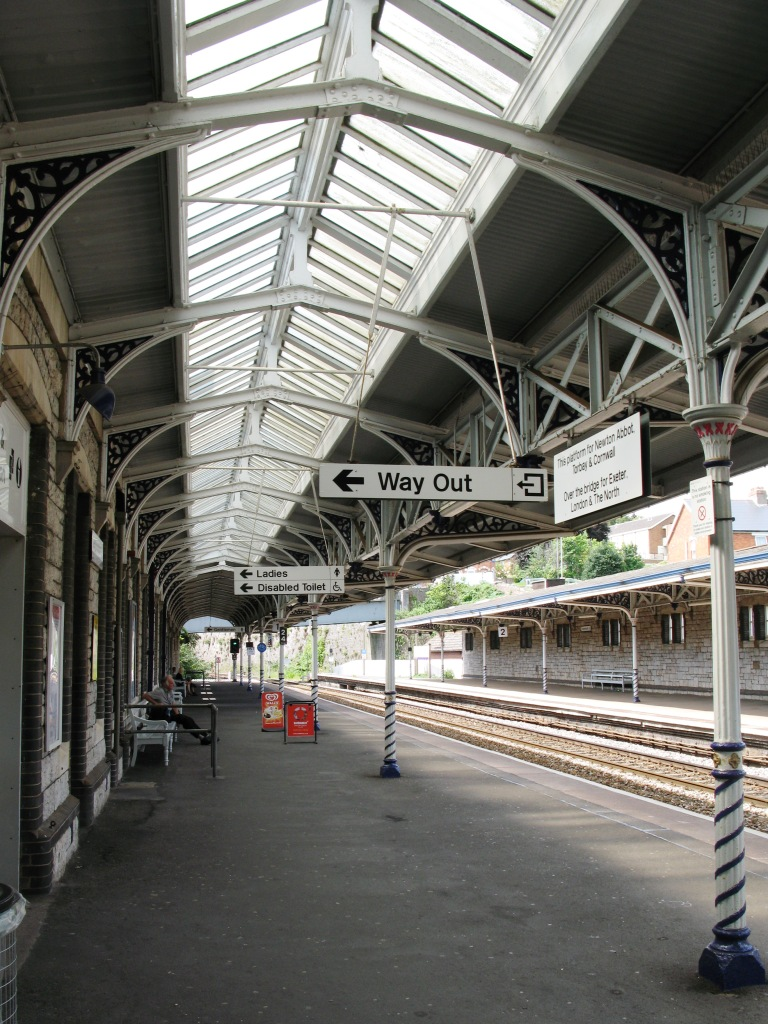
The canopy and buildings of 1895 still stand

The station was opened by the South Devon Railway Company on 30 May 1846, as the terminus of its first section from Exeter. The line was extended to Newton Abbot on 31 December 1846. The single platform was augmented by a second one late in 1848; at this time, it was a 7 ft 1/4 in (2,140 mm) broad gauge railway.

Teignmouth was the original headquarters of the South Devon Railway, the station and offices being described as a "primitive apology for a station" and dubbed locally as Noah's Ark.

Trains were worked from Exeter by atmospheric power from 13 September 1847 and these were extended to Newton Abbot from 17 December 1847, until all the atmospheric trains were suspended on 9 September 1848. The atmospheric engine house was situated adjacent to the platform on the side furthest from the town, the area then being used as permanent way workshops until about 1876.

The South Devon Railway was amalgamated into the Great Western Railway on 1 February 1876. When it was first built, the station was situated between two tunnels; however, the West Tunnel was opened out by June 1881 and the Eastcliffe Tunnel leading to the Sea Wall was removed by 1884, when the distinctive lattice girder bridge at the end of the Sea Wall was installed.

On 20 May 1892, the line was converted to 4 ft 8 1/2 in (1,435 mm) standard gauge. The station was completely rebuilt soon after, with the work being completed early in 1895. It now had a similar scale of facilities as those found at other big West Country resorts which had new stations during the last quarter of the century, Torquay and Weston-super-Mare. To accommodate longer trains, the westbound platform was extended in 1938 and could then handle 15 coach trains, but the opposite platform could not be extended due to the entrance to the goods yard.

The Great Western Railway in turn was nationalised into British Railways on 1 January 1948. General goods traffic at Teignmouth ceased on 14 June 1965, but coal traffic continued to be handled until 4 December 1967. This allowed the extension of the second platform to the length of InterCity trains, although this did not happen until 1981. The signal box, which was built at the west end of the westbound platform in 1896, was closed on 14 November 1986 when the new Panel Signal Box at Exeter took over control of the line.

The station was closed for two months during the repair of the railway and sea wall at Dawlish caused by the great storm of February 2014. The iron work supporting the roof was repainted during this period. Refurbishment of the pedestrian bridge between the platforms commenced in 2016.

== Description ==
The station is situated near the edge of the town centre, a short walk from the beach and South West Coast Path.

The main entrance and booking office are on the westbound platform; all of the main facilities, including a café, are situated here. The booking office is open six days a week; when closed, access to the station is through the gates adjacent to the wide footbridge which links the two platforms.

The station has ticket machines, waiting rooms, toilets and an 80-space car park.

== Services ==
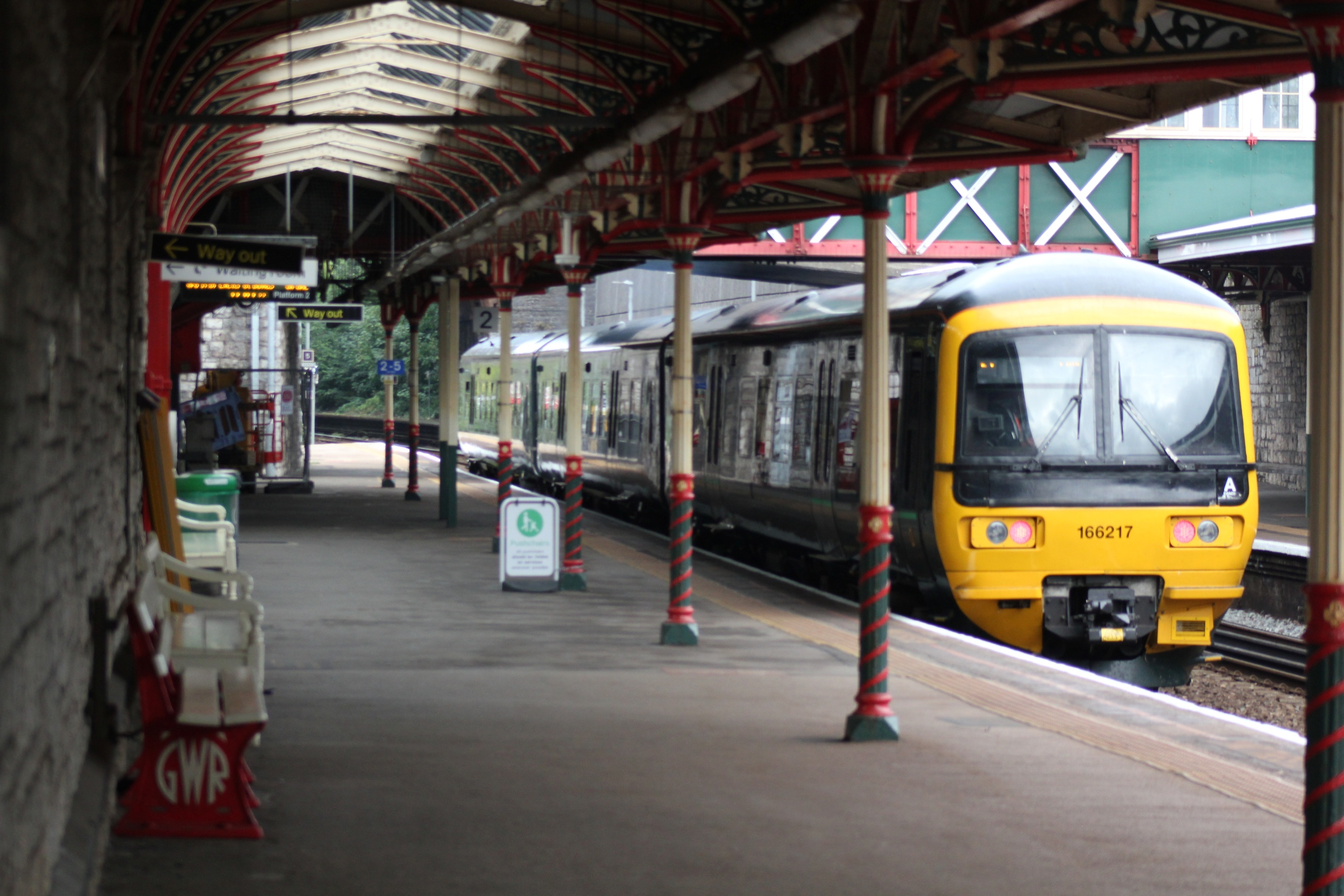
A GWR Class 166 at Teignmouth with a Paignton to Exmouth service

Teignmouth is served by four routes:

- Great Western Railway (GWR) operates a regular service between Exmouth and Paignton. These stop approximately half-hourly in each direction throughout the day; on Sundays, the service is less frequent and many trains only run between Exeter St Davids and Paignton.
- GWR runs services between Cardiff Central, Bristol Temple Meads, Plymouth and Penzance; some of these trains stop here
- GWR also runs services between London Paddington, Paignton, Plymouth and Penzance; some of these trains stop here
- CrossCountry operates two services per day in each direction between Manchester Piccadilly and Paignton that stop at Teignmouth.

Preceding station	National Rail	Following station
Newton Abbot towards Paignton	Great Western Railway Riviera Line	Dawlish towards Exeter St Davids
Newton Abbot	CrossCountry; Cornwall-Scotland	Dawlish

This station offers access to the South West Coast Path
Distance to path	0.25 miles (0.40 km)
Next station anticlockwise	Dawlish 3 miles (5 km)
Next station clockwise	Torquay 11 miles (18 km)
