= Lympstone Commando railway station =

Railway station in Devon, England

Lympstone Commando
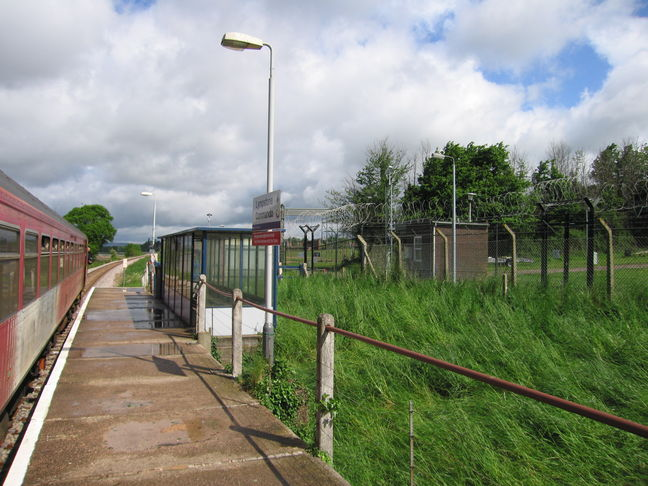

General information
- Location: Woodbury, East Devon; England
- Coordinates: 50.6623°N 3.441°W
- Grid reference: SX982857
- Manager: Great Western Railway
- Platforms: 1

Other information
- Station code: LYC
- Classification: DfT category F2

History
- Original company: British Rail

Key dates
- 3 May 1976: Opened

Passengers
- 2020/21: ▼19,050
- 2021/22: ▲76,134
- 2022/23: ▲83,160
- 2023/24: ▼79,010
- 2024/25: ▲86,996
Location
Notes
- Passenger statistics from the Office of Rail and Road

Lympstone Commando railway station serves the Commando Training Centre Royal Marines on the Avocet Line between Exton and Lympstone Village, in Devon, England. The station is 6 miles 23 chains (10.1 km) from Exmouth Junction, around 0.5 miles (0.80 km) from St James' Park.

Whilst signs on the station platform state that passengers alighting must have business with the Camp, the general public can access the station via a public footpath.

== History ==
The station was opened on 3 May 1976 by British Rail. This caused some confusion with the older Lympstone railway station, which was consequently renamed Lympstone Village. It was built using cast platform sections recovered from Weston Milton, where the track had been singled and one platform was no longer required.

On 28 May 2010, a section of the Exe Estuary Trail opened between Lympstone and Exton; this runs between the platform and the entrance to the camp. As a result, the public can now access the station, although the sign on the platform continues to state that "persons alighting here must have business with the camp." The Ministry of Defence have accepted that the station is the property of Network Rail and, as such, they cannot prohibit members of the public from using the station; however, people wishing to take photographs from the platform should inform the guard room at the Commando Training Centre beforehand.

In November 2020, the platform was extended by 25 m (82 ft) to make it 89 m (292 ft) long.

== Facilities ==
The station, due to its connection with the Commando Centre, only has a shelter and a help point. As there are no facilities to purchase tickets, passengers must buy one in advance, or from the guard on the train.

== Services ==
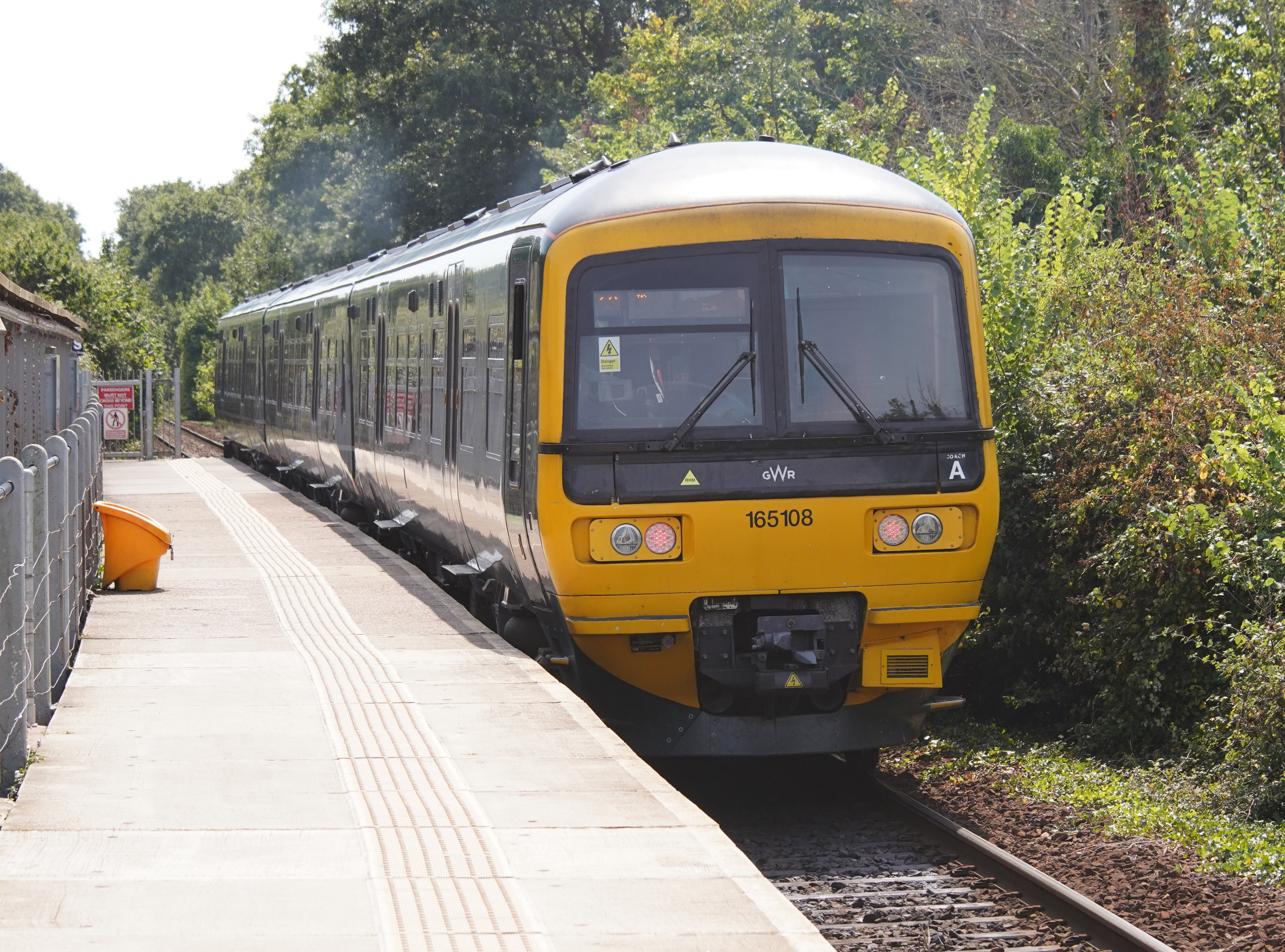
GWR Class 165 leaving Lympstone Commando towards Exmouth

Great Western Railway (GWR) operate all trains serving the station. Trains stop here on a generally hourly basis between Exmouth and Paignton, via Exeter St Davids; however, all services call here on Saturdays.

It is a request stop, meaning that passengers wishing to alight must tell the conductor that they wish to do so and those waiting to join must signal clearly to the driver as the train approaches.

Preceding station	National Rail	Following station
Exton towards Exeter St Davids	Great Western Railway Avocet Line	Lympstone Village towards Exmouth

== Passenger volume ==
Passenger volume at Lympstone Commando
	2004–05	2005–06	2006–07	2007–08	2008–09	2009–10	2010–11	2011–12	2012–13	2013–14	2014–15	2015–16	2016–17	2017–18	2018–19	2019–20	2020–21	2021–22	2022–23	2023–24	2024–25
Entries and exits	55,875	62,141	64,024	57,766	65,146	60,558	47,660	38,590	39,038	55,910	54,972	54,026	64,690	61,450	64,294	69,846	19,050	76,134	83,160	79,010	86,996

The statistics cover twelve month periods that start in April.

== Bibliography ==
- Wills, Dixe (2014). Tiny Stations (Paperback, 1st reprint ed.). Basingstoke: AA Publishing. ISBN 978-0-7495-7732-2.
