= Polsloe Bridge railway station =

Railway station in Devon, England

Polsloe Bridge
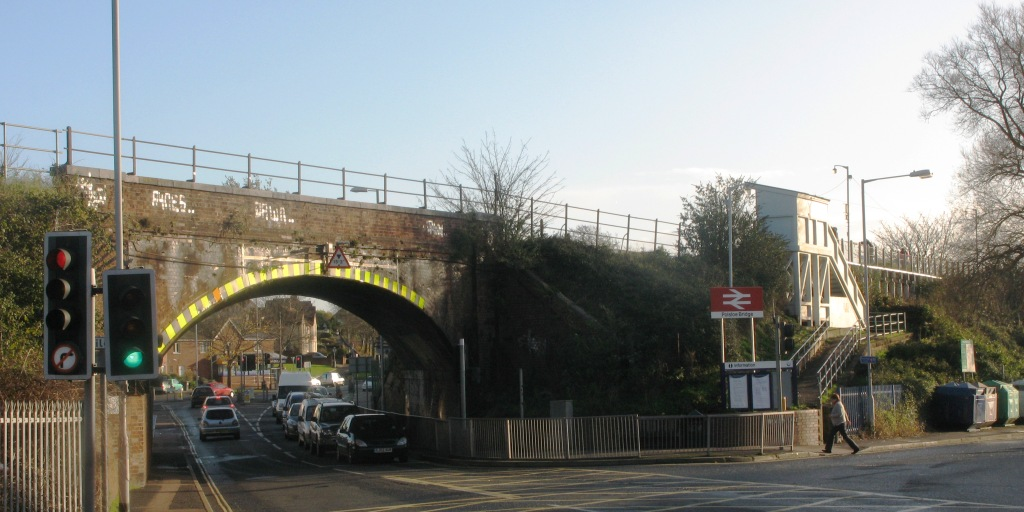

General information
- Location: Polsloe Bridge, Exeter; England
- Coordinates: 50.73119°N 3.50169°W
- Grid reference: SX941934
- Manager: Great Western Railway
- Platforms: 1

Other information
- Station code: POL
- Classification: DfT category F2

History
- Original company: London and South Western Railway
- Post-grouping: Southern Railway

Key dates
- Opened: 1907

Passengers
- 2020/21: ▼42,680
- 2021/22: ▲0.130 million
- 2022/23: ▲0.159 million
- 2023/24: ▲0.183 million
- 2024/25: ▲0.189 million
Location
Notes
- Passenger statistics from the Office of Rail and Road

Polsloe Bridge railway station is a suburban railway station in Exeter, Devon, England. The station serves the Polsloe, Mount Pleasant, Hamlin and Whipton areas of the city.

== History ==
The station was opened in 1907 to serve the eastern suburbs of Exeter. It was situated just a short distance along the branch to Exmouth and was convenient for Exmouth Junction engine shed which was on the opposite side of the main line.

The platforms were rebuilt in 1927 using concrete components cast at the concrete workshop that had been established at Exmouth Junction. On 4 February 1973 the branch was singled and the down platform taken out of use.

Private goods sidings were provided on the west side of the line on both sides of the station. Between the platform and the junction was a siding to a brickworks, while a little to the south was Newcourt, a military depot.

== Description and facilities ==
The station has one platform currently in use – on the right of trains arriving from Exeter – situated on an embankment above Pinhoe Road. The only access to the station is via a number of steps. The former second platform and its stairwell to street level remains opposite the platform in use, albeit very overgrown and derelict.

There is no ticket machine. It has no disabled access or toilet facilities on the platform. There is a small car park which can fit a handful of cars.

== Services ==
About half the trains on the Avocet Line from Exmouth to Exeter St Davids and Paignton call at Polsloe Bridge. Connections are available at Exeter Central for Barnstaple, Okehampton, Honiton and other stations to Waterloo; passengers for other main line stations change at Exeter St Davids.

Preceding station	National Rail	Following station
St James Park towards Exeter St Davids	Great Western Railway Avocet Line	Digby & Sowton towards Exmouth
