= Woodbury, East Devon =

Village in Devon, England

Coordinates: 50.67603°N 3.40107°W

Woodbury
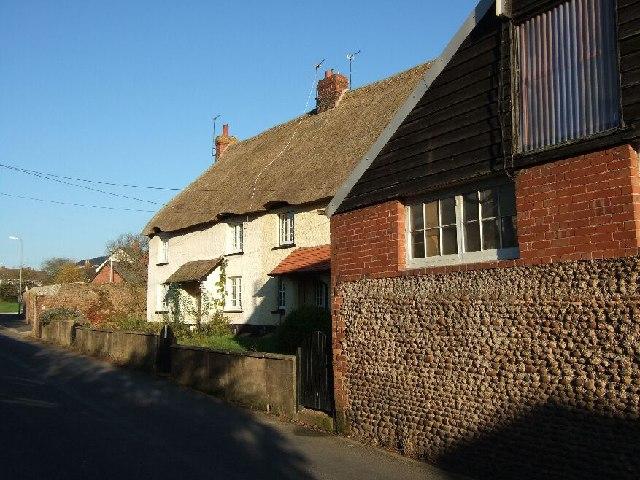
- Woodbury

- Location within Devon
- Population: 1,605 (2011)
- OS grid reference: SY011872
- Civil parish: Woodbury
- District: East Devon
- Shire county: Devon
- Region: South West
- Country: England
- Sovereign state: United Kingdom
- Post town: Exeter
- Postcode district: EX5
- Dialling code: 01395
- Police: Devon and Cornwall
- Fire: Devon and Somerset
- Ambulance: South Western
- UK Parliament: Exmouth and Exeter East

Woodbury is a village and civil parish in East Devon in the English county of Devon, 7 miles (11 km) south east of the city of Exeter. At the 2011 Census the village had a population of 1,605, and the parish (which also includes Exton and Woodbury Salterton) had a population of 3,466. It lies on the east bank of the Exe Estuary, has borders – clockwise from the estuary – with the district of Exeter (near to Topsham) and then the parishes of Clyst St George, Clyst St Mary, Farringdon, Colaton Raleigh, Bicton and Lympstone. Woodbury is part of the electoral ward of Woodbury and Lympstone whose population at the 2011 Census was 5,260.

The village itself lies about four miles north of the centre of Exmouth on the B3179 road between Clyst St George and Budleigh Salterton. About two miles to the north lies the east–west A3052 road and about 1.5 miles to the west of the village the A376 road that follows the Exe Estuary from Exeter down to Exmouth passes through the parish. The small settlements of Ebford and Exton are on this road.

== History ==
Woodbury Castle is an Iron Age fort on Woodbury Common.

The ancient manor of Nutwell was in the west of the parish, adjacent to the Exe Estuary; it was later owned by a branch of the Drake family. The present house, Nutwell Court was built in 1810.

The railway line which follows the estuary between Exeter and Exmouth was opened in 1861. Now known as the Avocet Line, the nearest station to Woodbury is at Exton.

The clergyman and botanist W. Keble Martin lived in Woodbury in retirement, as did the composer and music administrator Christopher Le Fleming.

== The village ==
The village centre has a Londis shop, two antiques shops and a garage. There are two pubs, "The Maltsters Arms" and "The White Hart", and a Chinese take-away/fish and chip shop “Little China”, Woodbury Church of England Primary School has over 140 pupils since the building of new classroom facilities in 2010.

The parish church, dedicated to Saint Swithun is early 15th century (consecrated in 1409): the Perpendicular style is mixed with elements of the older Decorated. Interesting features include the woodwork of the screen, the 15th-century font, Elizabethan altar rails, Jacobean pulpit, and an early 17th-century monument to a man and his wife (recumbent effigies on a tomb-chest).

Woodbury is twinned with Bretteville sur Odon in Normandy.
