= Newcourt railway station (England) =

Railway station in Exeter, England

Newcourt (Exeter)
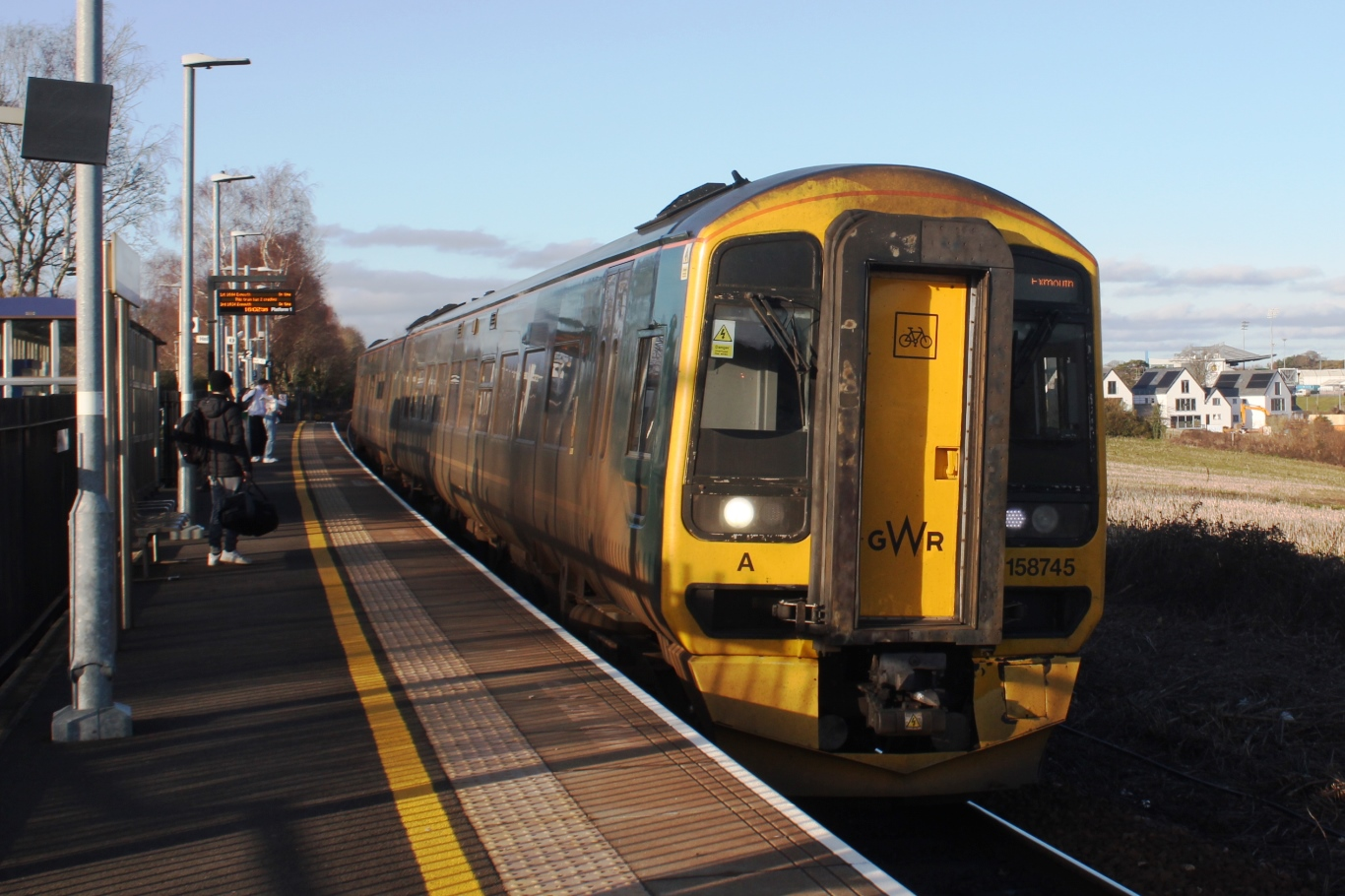

General information
- Location: Newcourt, Exeter; England
- Coordinates: 50.7023°N 3.472°W
- Grid reference: SX961902
- Managed by: Great Western Railway
- Platforms: 1

Other information
- Station code: NCO

History
- Opened: 4 June 2015

Passengers
- 2020/21: ▼38,944
- 2021/22: ▲0.109 million
- 2022/23: ▲0.146 million
- 2023/24: ▲0.158 million
- 2024/25: ▼0.155 million
Location
Notes
- Passenger statistics from the Office of Rail and Road

Newcourt railway station is the newest railway station on the Avocet Line, serving the Newcourt area of Exeter, United Kingdom. The station is sited between Digby & Sowton and Topsham and was opened to passenger traffic on 4 June 2015. The station is managed and operated by Great Western Railway.

== History ==
Following meetings in September and November 2010, a masterplan for the redevelopment of the Newcourt area of Exeter prepared by Atkins was approved by Exeter City Council as a Supplementary Planning Document. The masterplan set out the basis upon which an area of land to the east of Exeter city centre bounded by Topsham Road to the south west, the A379 to the north and Rydon Lane to the west could be sustainably developed to provide 16 hectares (40 acres) of employment land and 3,500 dwellings. As the masterplan did not assess the transport implications of the proposed development, a supplementary report was published in January 2011 by Devon County Council which identified rail transport as having the greatest potential to reduce levels of private car use. The report confirmed that Jacobs Engineering had carried out a feasibility study and concluded that there were no technical reasons why a single-platform halt could not be provided at Newcourt, in a similar manner to that at Digby & Sowton. According to the report, modelling work had shown that a station at Newcourt would generate at least 500 individual daily journeys, which would mitigate the impacts of the Newcourt development at the already congested road junctions of Countess Wear and junction 30 of the M5. Provision of the station was costed at £4 million on the basis that construction would begin in 2015 for opening in 2016.

In May 2013, it was announced that Newcourt would be one of four stations to benefit from the Coalition government's New Station Fund together with Ilkeston, Lea Bridge and Pye Corner. The fund will provide £1.5 million towards the station and the remainder will come from developers' contributions. Construction began in September 2014. The station opened on 4 June 2015.

The station could form part of the proposed "Devon Metro" rail network to increase connectivity to and from commuter towns such as Exmouth and Cullompton, with new stations at Marsh Barton, Monkerton and Cranbrook.

== Description and facilities ==
The single platform is 124 metres (407 ft) long and a passenger shelter, ticket machine and customer information system are provided. Pedestrian access is provided from Liberty Way where there is a small drop-off area and disabled parking. Provision has been made for a future underpass crossing.

The station is situated partially within the former Royal Naval Stores Depot.

== Services ==
The station is served by all trains on the Avocet Line to Exmouth which gives a half-hourly service in each direction for most of the day. All trains run to or from Exeter St Davids and most continue to or from Paignton.

Preceding station	National Rail	Following station
Digby & Sowton towards Exeter St Davids	Great Western Railway Avocet Line	Topsham towards Exmouth
