= St James Park station =

St James Park station may refer to:

- St James's Park tube station, a tube station in London, England
- St James Park railway station, a national railway station in Exeter, England
