= Digby & Sowton railway station =

Railway station in the Devon, England

Digby & Sowton
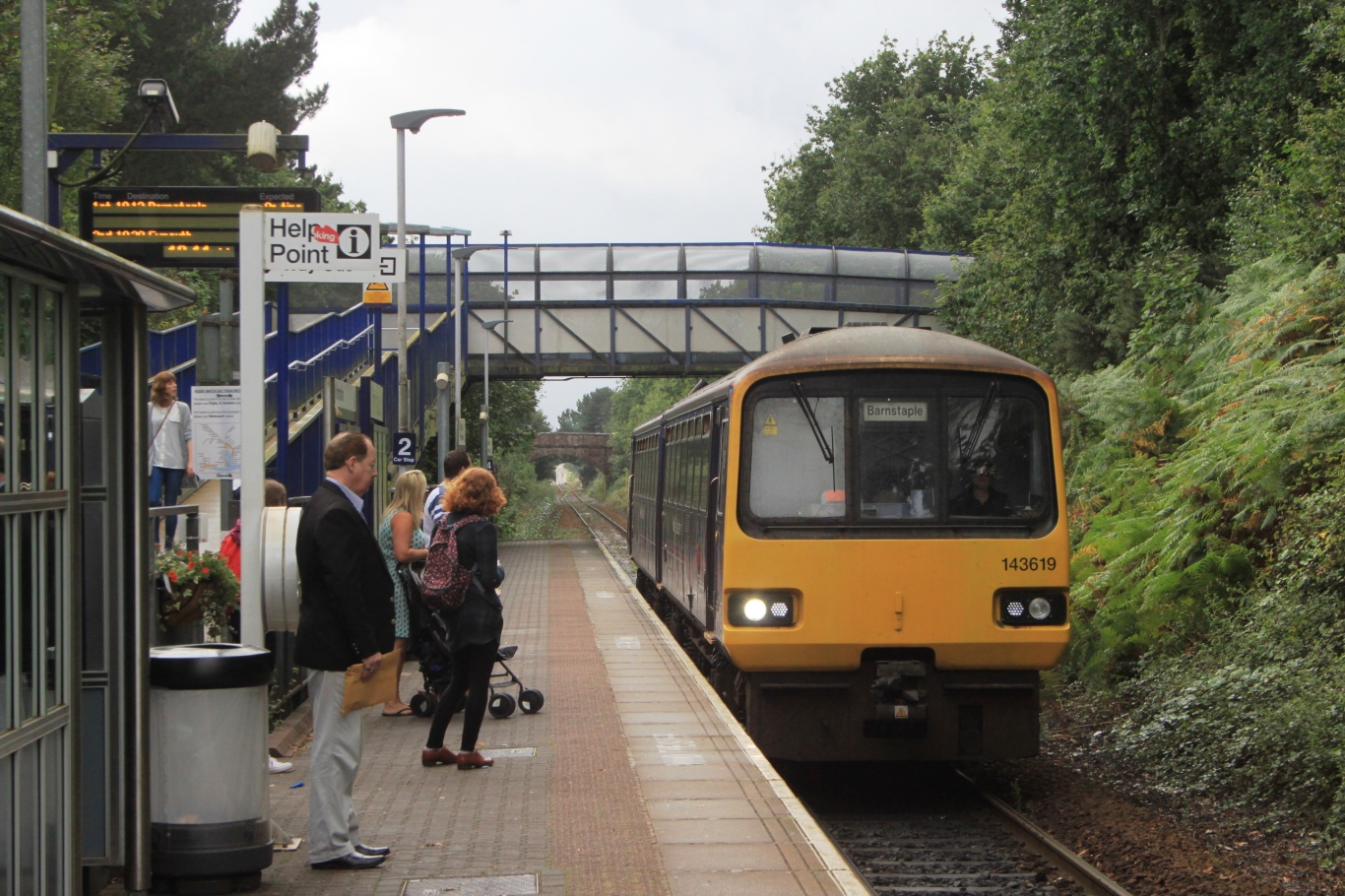

General information
- Location: Digby, Exeter; England
- Coordinates: 50.714°N 3.474°W
- Grid reference: SX960914
- Managed by: Great Western Railway
- Platforms: 1

Other information
- Station code: DIG
- Classification: DfT category F1

History
- Original company: Railtrack

Key dates
- 23 May 1995: Opened

Passengers
- 2020/21: ▼0.299 million
- 2021/22: ▲0.570 million
- 2022/23: ▲0.891 million
- 2023/24: ▼0.804 million
- 2024/25: ▲0.968 million
Location
Notes
- Passenger statistics from the Office of Rail and Road

Digby & Sowton is a railway station on the Avocet Line of the Devon Metro in Exeter, England.

== History ==
A small station known as Clyst St Mary and Digby Halt was opened by the London and South Western Railway on 1 June 1908 to serve Clyst St Mary and Digby Hospital. The 120 foot (37 m) long platforms were built from old railway sleepers. It was closed by the new British Railways on 27 September 1948.

The present Digby and Sowton station, which was constructed at a cost of £700,000, was funded by Devon County Council and Tesco Stores Limited as part of an initiative to reduce traffic congestion in Exeter. Construction began on 9 November 1994 and it opened on 23 May 1995. It is situated about 380 yards (350 m) south of the site of the old station to serve new housing on the site of the now closed psychiatric hospital, and also a light industrial estate at nearby Sowton.

The station was operated by Wessex Trains, until 31 March 2006 when First Great Western (renamed Great Western Railway in 2015) took over the franchise.

== Facilities ==
Digby and Sowton was included in a 2009 scheme to improve local railway stations. Shelter space for passengers was doubled, better surface and lighting was installed, and a new footpath was created. The station has a cycle network connecting stations along the Avocet Line from Exmouth to Exeter St Davids was improved.

== Location ==
The station serves the Sowton Industrial Estate via a long foot/cycle path that runs along the railway line and the housing estates around the former Digby Hospital through a step free access bridge, with divided sections for cycles and pedestrians. The station is also a short walk to/from the Sandy Park rugby ground, the home of the Exeter Chiefs.

== Passenger volume ==
There has been considerable growth in passenger usage of Digby & Sowton. During the twelve months ended March 2003, over 120,000 people used the station, and this doubled within five years. In 2009, over 275,000 passengers used the rail station, making it one of the busiest unstaffed railway stations in the area. Major growth continued and according to ORR statistics, usage reached nearly 1 million people in 2024/5, making it the busiest station between Exeter Central and Exmouth with usage only slightly below the latter.

| | 2002-03 | 2004-05 | 2005-06 | 2006-07 | 2007-08 |
|---|---|---|---|---|---|
| Entries | 60,818 | 68,208 | 78,811 | 101,063 | 125,299 |
| Exits | 59,687 | 66,596 | 77,011 | 100,891 | 122,153 |
| Total | 120,505 | 134,804 | 155,822 | 201,954 | 247,452 |

The statistics cover twelve month periods that start in April.

== Services ==
The station is served by all trains on the Avocet Line between Exmouth, Exeter St Davids and Paignton.

| Preceding station | National Rail | Following station |
|---|---|---|
| Polsloe Bridge towards Exeter St Davids | Great Western Railway Avocet Line | Newcourt towards Exmouth |
