= Exton railway station =

Railway station in the Devon, England

Exton
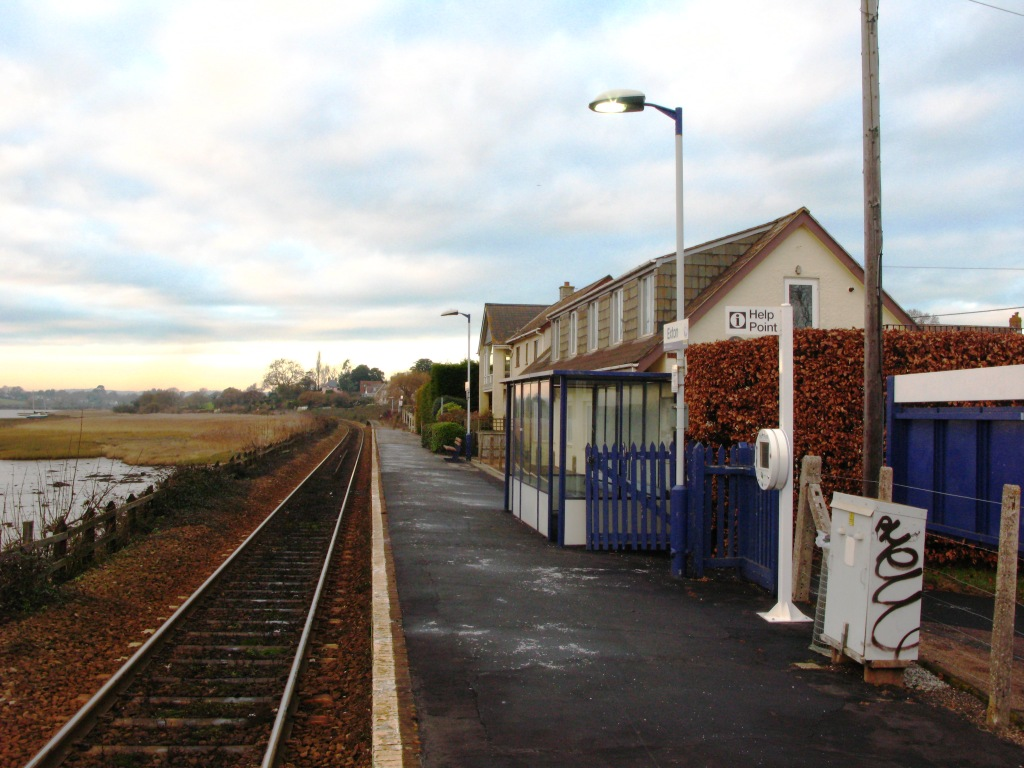

General information
- Location: Exton, East Devon; England
- Coordinates: 50.66792°N 3.44374°W
- Grid reference: SX980863
- Manager: Great Western Railway
- Platforms: 1

Other information
- Station code: EXN
- Classification: DfT category F2

History
- Original company: London and South Western Railway
- Post-grouping: Southern Railway

Key dates
- 1861: Opened as Woodbury Road
- 15 Sept.1958: Renamed Exton

Passengers
- 2021/22: ▲20,082
- 2022/23: ▲23,370
- 2023/24: ▲25,872
- 2024/25: ▼25,256
- 2025/26: ▲28,106
Location
Notes
- Passenger statistics from the Office of Rail and Road

Exton railway station is a railway station serving the village of Exton in Devon, England. It is situated on the Avocet Line which runs between Exeter St Davids and Exmouth.

== History ==
A station known as Woodbury Road opened with the railway on 1 May 1861; It was renamed Exton on 15 Sept 1958 and became Exton Halt on 28 February 1965 but has since lost the "halt" suffix in common with most similar stations. Its location on the banks of the River Exe was exploited for many years by placing a camping coach in the goods yard that could be hired by holidaymakers.

== Location ==
The station has a single platform that serves trains in both directions (it is on the left of a train arriving from Exeter) and faces out across the estuary of the River Exe.

The platform is much lower than usual in the United Kingdom which leads to a significant step up into the trains. This is difficult for the less mobile or for people with luggage, also while all trains carry wheelchair ramps, it is not possible to use them here, due to the narrow width of the platform. A Harrington Hump has also been installed as of 2018.

== Services ==
About half of the trains on the Avocet Line from Exmouth to Exeter St Davids and Paignton call at Exton, all on request. This means that passengers alighting here must tell the conductor that they wish to do so, and those waiting to join must signal clearly to the driver as the train approaches.

Connections are available at Exeter St Davids for Barnstaple and other main line stations, and at Exeter Central, for stations to London Waterloo.

| Preceding station | National Rail | Following station |
|---|---|---|
| Topsham towards Exeter St Davids | Great Western Railway Avocet Line | Lympstone Commando towards Exmouth |
