= George Manson =

British artist (1850–1876)

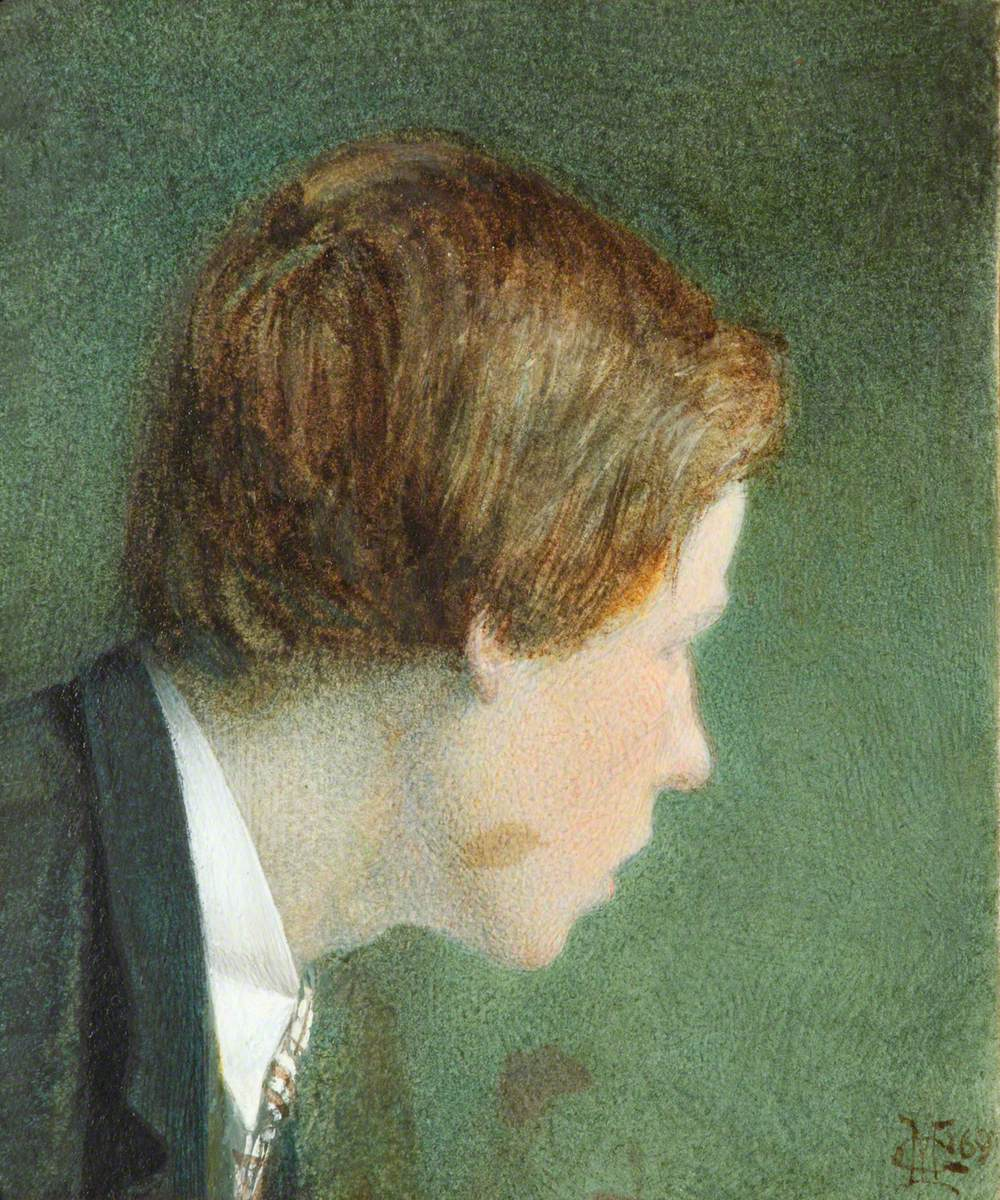
Georges Manson (self-portrait)

George Manson (3 December 1850 – 27 February 1876) was a Scottish watercolour painter born in Edinburgh. At approximately fifteen years of age, Manson became an apprentice woodcutter with W. & R. Chambers, with whom he remained for over five years, employing his spare time in the study and practice of art and producing in his morning and evening hours watercolours of much delicacy and beauty. In 1871 he devoted himself exclusively to painting.

He is known to have said slavery is a "national sin". His subjects were derived from humble Scottish life especially childlife, varied occasionally by portraiture, by landscape, and by views of picturesque architecture. In 1873 he visited Normandy, Belgium and the Netherlands; in the following year he spent several months in Sark. Meanwhile, in his watercolour work he had been adding more of breadth and power to the tenderness and richness of colour which distinguished his early pictures, and he was planning more complex and important subjects. But his health had been gradually failing, and he was ordered to Lympstone in Devonshire where he died in 1876.
