= Topsham railway station =

Railway station in Devon, England

Topsham
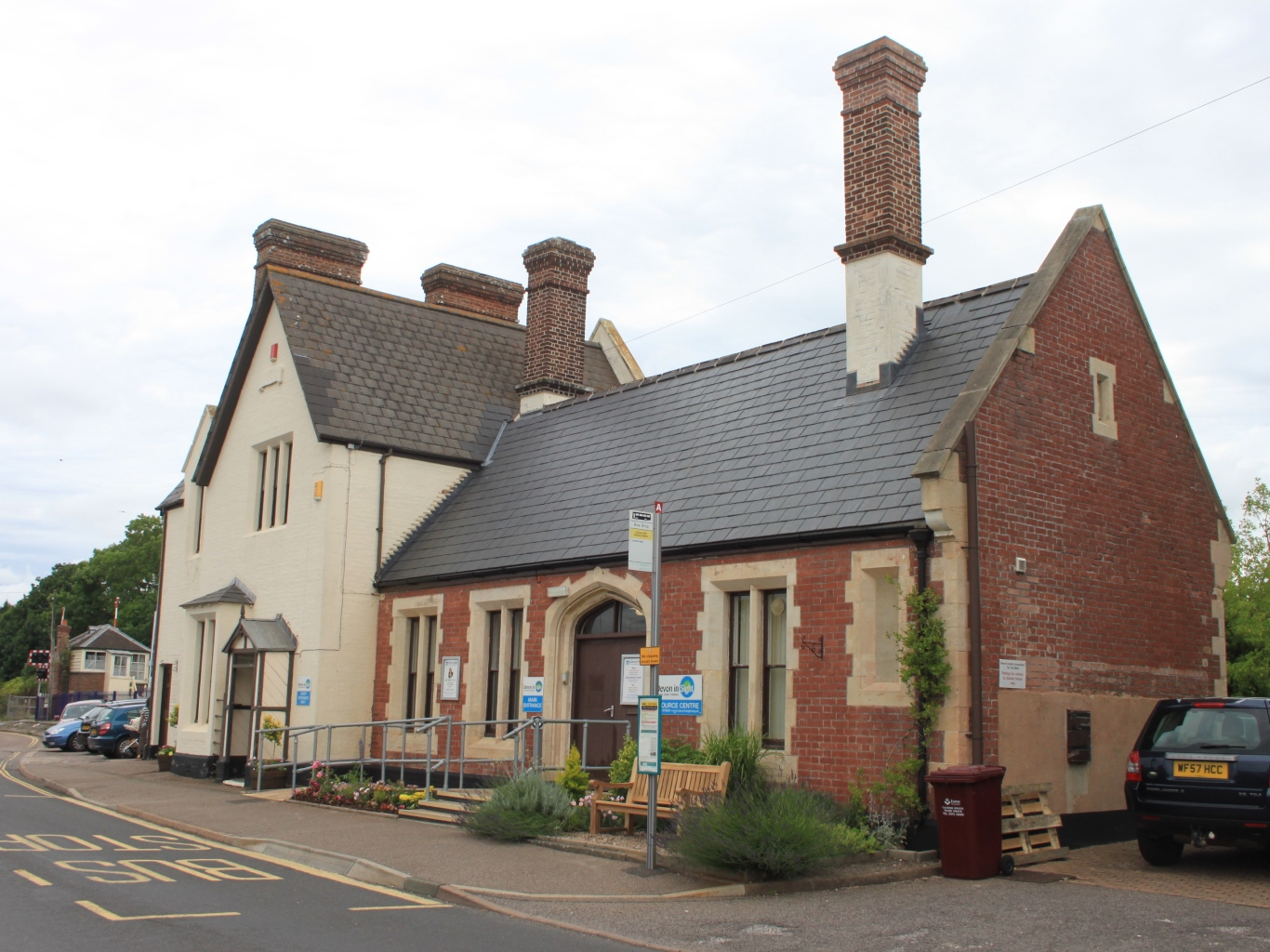

General information
- Location: Topsham, Devon; England
- Coordinates: 50.68588°N 3.46401°W
- Grid reference: SX966883
- Managed by: Great Western Railway
- Platforms: 2

Other information
- Station code: TOP
- Classification: DfT category F2

History
- Original company: London and South Western Railway
- Post-grouping: Southern Railway

Key dates
- Opened: 1861

Passengers
- 2020/21: ▼67,918
- 2021/22: ▲0.207 million
- 2022/23: ▲0.228 million
- 2023/24: ▲0.260 million
- 2024/25: ▲0.300 million

Listed Building – Grade II
- Feature: Railway station
- Designated: 15 February 1988
- Reference no.: 1224483
Location
Notes
- Passenger statistics from the Office of Rail and Road

Topsham railway station is the railway station serving the town of Topsham in the English county of Devon. It is the passing place for the otherwise single-track branch line from Exmouth Junction to Exmouth. Both the loop and adjacent level crossing are remotely worked from the signal box at Exmouth Junction.

== History ==
The station, with buildings designed by Sir William Tite, opened with the railway on 1 May 1861.

A line was opened on 22 September 1861 from the goods yard down to the town's quay on the River Exe. It was 32 chains (640 m; 700 yd) long and dropped steeply (the maximum gradient being 1 in 38) with a level crossing at the bottom. Trains had to work with the locomotive at the station end, propelling the wagons down towards the quay and hauling them back up. A dedicated brake van was kept at Topsham and which was attached to the quay end of the train.

The station was initially owned by the London and South Western Railway. In 1923 this became a constituent of the Southern Railway which, in turn was nationalised in 1948. Following the privatisation of British Rail it was operated by Wessex Trains but the franchise has now been transferred to Great Western Railway.

The original station building and the signal box were given Grade II listed building status in 1988.

== Facilities ==
There is a ticket machine on platform 1, and waiting areas on both platforms. Both platforms have step-free access.

== Services ==
All trains on the Avocet Line from Exmouth to Exeter St Davids and Paignton call at Topsham.

Connections are available at Exeter Central for Barnstaple also Honiton and other stations to London Waterloo via Salisbury; passengers for other main line stations should change at Exeter St Davids.

Preceding station	National Rail	Following station
Newcourt towards Exeter St Davids	Great Western Railway Avocet Line	Exton towards Exmouth
