= Exton, Devon =

Village in Devon, England

Coordinates: 50.669103°N 3.436553°W

Exton
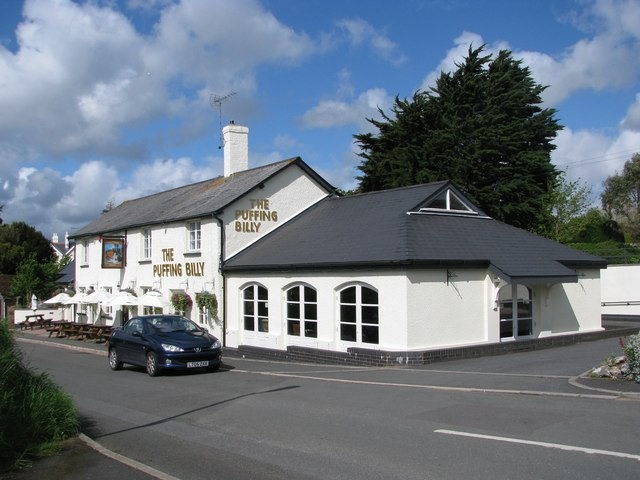
- The Puffing Billy pub in Exton

- Location within Devon
- Civil parish: Woodbury
- District: East Devon
- Shire county: Devon
- Region: South West
- Country: England
- Sovereign state: United Kingdom
- Post town: EXMOUTH
- Postcode district: EX3
- Dialling code: 01392
- Police: Devon and Cornwall
- Fire: Devon and Somerset
- Ambulance: South Western
- UK Parliament: Exmouth and Exeter East

Exton is a village in East Devon, Devon, England; it is situated on the east bank of the River Clyst, as it flows through the wider Exe Estuary. The town of Topsham lies 1 mile (1.6 km) to the north-west.

== Amenities ==
Facilities include St. Andrew's CofE church, a village hall, a petrol station, two bed and breakfasts, and a pub restaurant and hostelry called the Puffing Billy.

To the immediate south is the Commando Training Centre Royal Marines.

== Transport ==
The village is served by Exton railway station, on the Avocet Line. Great Western Railway operates a generally half-hourly train service between Exmouth and Paignton, via Exeter St Davids.

The A376 road passes through the east side of the village. It has a population of 1,287.

National Cycle Route 2 passes through the village.
