= St James Park railway station =

Railway station in Exeter, Devon, England

St James Park
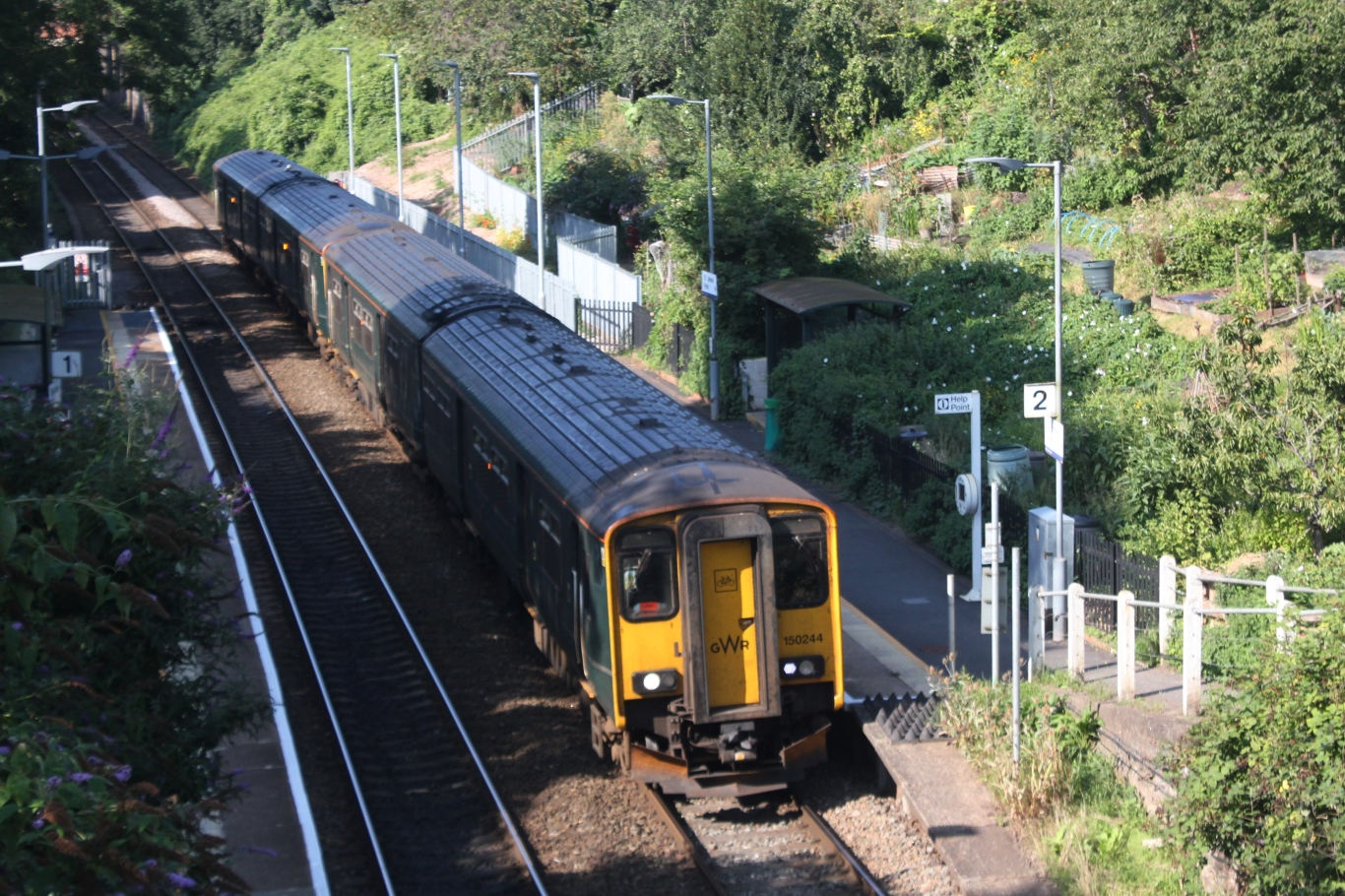

General information
- Location: Exeter, Devon; England
- Coordinates: 50°43′51″N 3°31′21″W
- Grid reference: SX925934
- Managed by: Great Western Railway
- Platforms: 2

Construction
- Structure type: At-grade, recessed into cutting
- Accessible: Platform 1 has no step-free access, platform 2 has step-free access via a steep ramp

Other information
- Station code: SJP
- Classification: DfT category F2

History
- Original company: London and South Western Railway
- Post-grouping: Southern Railway

Key dates
- 1906: Opened as Lion's Holt Halt
- 1946: Renamed St James Park Halt
- 1969: Renamed St James Park

Passengers
- 2020/21: ▼34,950
- 2021/22: ▲0.106 million
- 2022/23: ▲0.123 million
- 2023/24: ▲0.143 million
- 2024/25: ▲0.145 million
Location
Notes
- Passenger statistics from the Office of Rail and Road

St James Park is a suburban railway station on the Avocet Line of the Devon Metro in Exeter, England. It is 170 miles 72 chains (275.0 km) down the line from London Waterloo. The station nominally serves the St James Park football ground, of which Exeter City F.C. has adopted the station through the community rail scheme. Great Western Railway manages the station and operates all services in both directions.

From its opening as a halt in 1906 until 1946, the station was called Lion's Holt Halt, and afterwards was officially called St James Park Halt until 1969.

== History ==
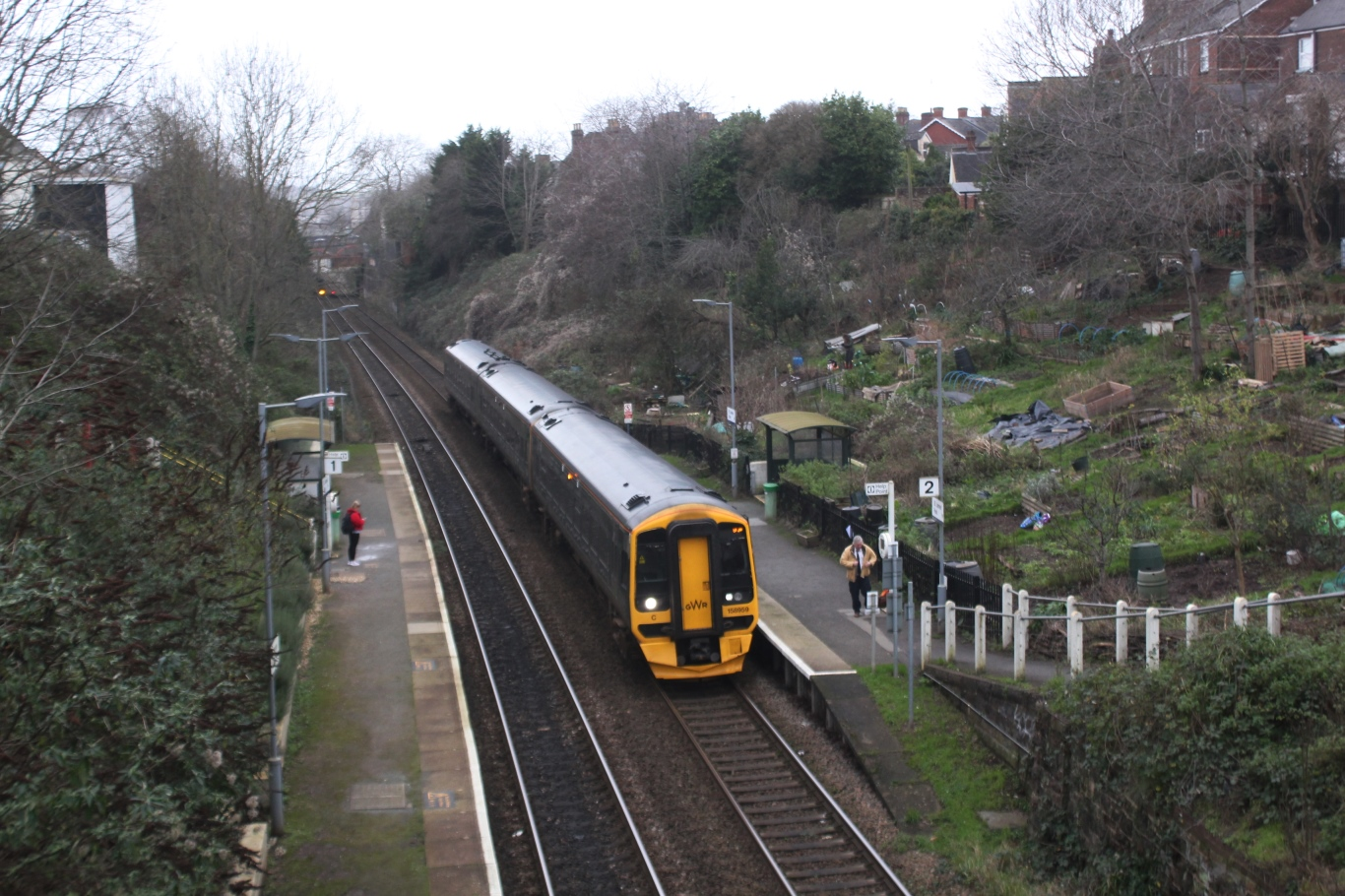
A three-car Class 158 from Barnstaple at Platform 2 before 2021 improvement works, only the front car is at the platform.

A small station named Lion's Holt Halt was opened in the cutting west of Blackboy Tunnel on 26 January 1906. Mount Pleasant Road Halt was opened at the same time to the east of the tunnel but was closed in 1928.

The name of Lion's Holt was changed to St James Park on 7 October 1946, the name of the Exeter City F.C. football ground, which is next to the station. The club has adopted the station under the community railways scheme and contributes to its upkeep.

Tarka line services from Barnstaple terminated at St James Park from December 2018, reversing in the siding at Exmouth Junction before returning. In the May 2021 timetable they terminate at Exeter Central but will still run through St James Park when they reverse in the siding at Exmouth Junction.

Works took place in early 2021 to extend platform 1 by 10 metres and platform 2 by 49 metres to fit longer trains used on the line since the withdrawal of Class 143 units.

== Description ==
There are two platforms. The Exeter-bound Platform 1 is about 240 feet (73 m) in length. Platform 2 (for trains toward Exmouth) was originally very short (about 120 feet or 37 metres) and could only be served by a one 20 metres (66 ft) coach trains. Longer trains had to use selective door opening or single door opening.

== Services ==
Avocet Line services between Exmouth and Exeter St Davids call at St James Park. Beyond St Davids they generally continue on the Riviera Line to Paignton. Roughly half the services stop, giving an hourly service for most of the day.

South Western Railway services between London Waterloo and Exeter St Davids pass through the station but do not stop; passengers for this route have to change at Exeter Central.

Preceding station	Devon Metro	Following station
Exeter Central towards Exeter St Davids	Avocet Line Great Western Railway	Polsloe Bridge towards Exmouth
