= Arthur Bartholomew (cricketer) =

English cricketer and schoolmaster

Personal information
- Full name: Arthur Churchill Bartholomew
- Born: 21 February 1846; Lympstone, Devon, England
- Died: 29 March 1940 (aged 94); Reading, Berkshire, England
- Batting: Right-handed
- Relatives: Arthur Wollaston Bartholomew (son)

Domestic team information
- Years: Team
- 1866–1868: Oxford University

Career statistics
Competition	First-class
Matches	8
Runs scored	158
Batting average	15.80
100s/50s	0/1
Top score	54
Catches/stumpings	5/–
- Source: Cricinfo, 11 February 2018

Arthur Churchill Bartholomew (21 February 1846 – 29 March 1940) was an English cricketer and schoolmaster.

Bartholomew was educated at Marlborough College and Trinity College, Oxford. He played a few first-class matches for Oxford University over three seasons from 1866 to 1868, with a highest score of 54 in the victory over Surrey in 1867. He was regarded as one of the best cover point fieldsmen of the day.

Bartholomew became an assistant master at Brighton College, and later was headmaster of preparatory schools at Great Marlow and Reading. At the time of his death he was the oldest surviving Oxbridge cricket Blue. His son was Major General Arthur Wollaston Bartholomew.
