= Commando Training Centre Royal Marines =

Royal Marines principal training centre

Commando Training Centre Royal Marines
- Lympstone, Devon, England
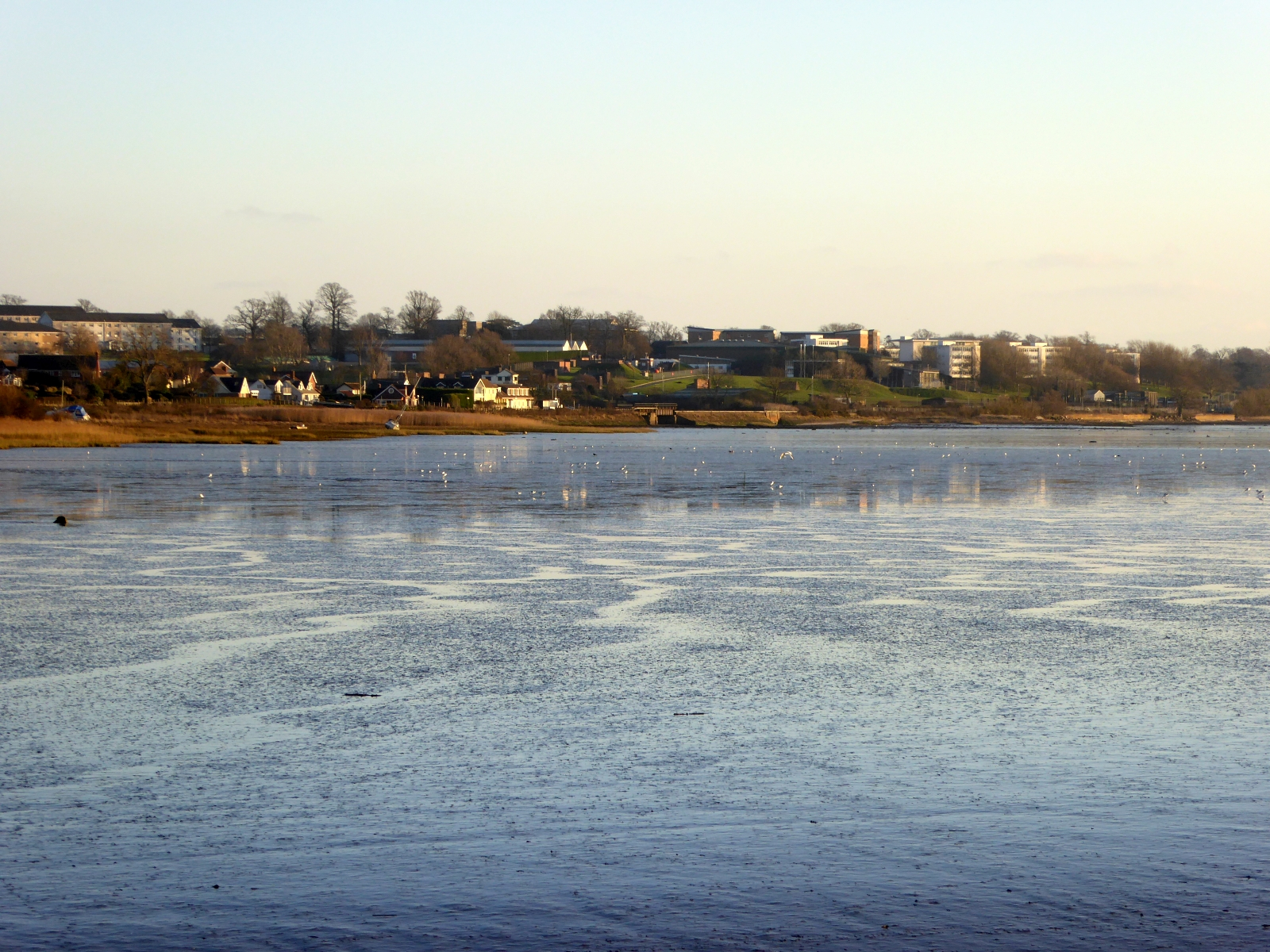
- Commando Training Centre Royal Marines, from across the River Exe

Site information
- Type: Royal Marines Base
- Owner: Ministry of Defence
- Operator: Royal Navy
- Controlled by: Royal Marines
- Website: CTCRM Lympstone - Royal Navy

Location
- Location within Devon Commando Training Centre Royal Marines (the United Kingdom)
- Coordinates: 50.663971°N 3.438024°W

Site history
- Built: 1940
- Built for: Admiralty
- In use: 1940–present

Garrison information
- Current commander: Colonel Innes Catton
- Garrison: Commando Training Centre
- Occupants: Commando Wing; Commando Training Wing; Specialist Wing

Commando Training Centre Royal Marines (CTCRM) is the principal military training centre for the Royal Marines. It is situated near the villages of Lympstone and Exton, between the city of Exeter, and the town of Exmouth in Devon, England.

== History ==
The site was established in 1940 as the "Royal Marines Depot Exton" and was renamed the "Royal Marines Depot Lympstone" later in the Second World War. In February 1960, the Commando School Royal Marines, which had been based at Bickleigh Barracks, moved to the site. The site was renamed the "Commando Training Centre Royal Marines" in 1972.

== Organisation ==
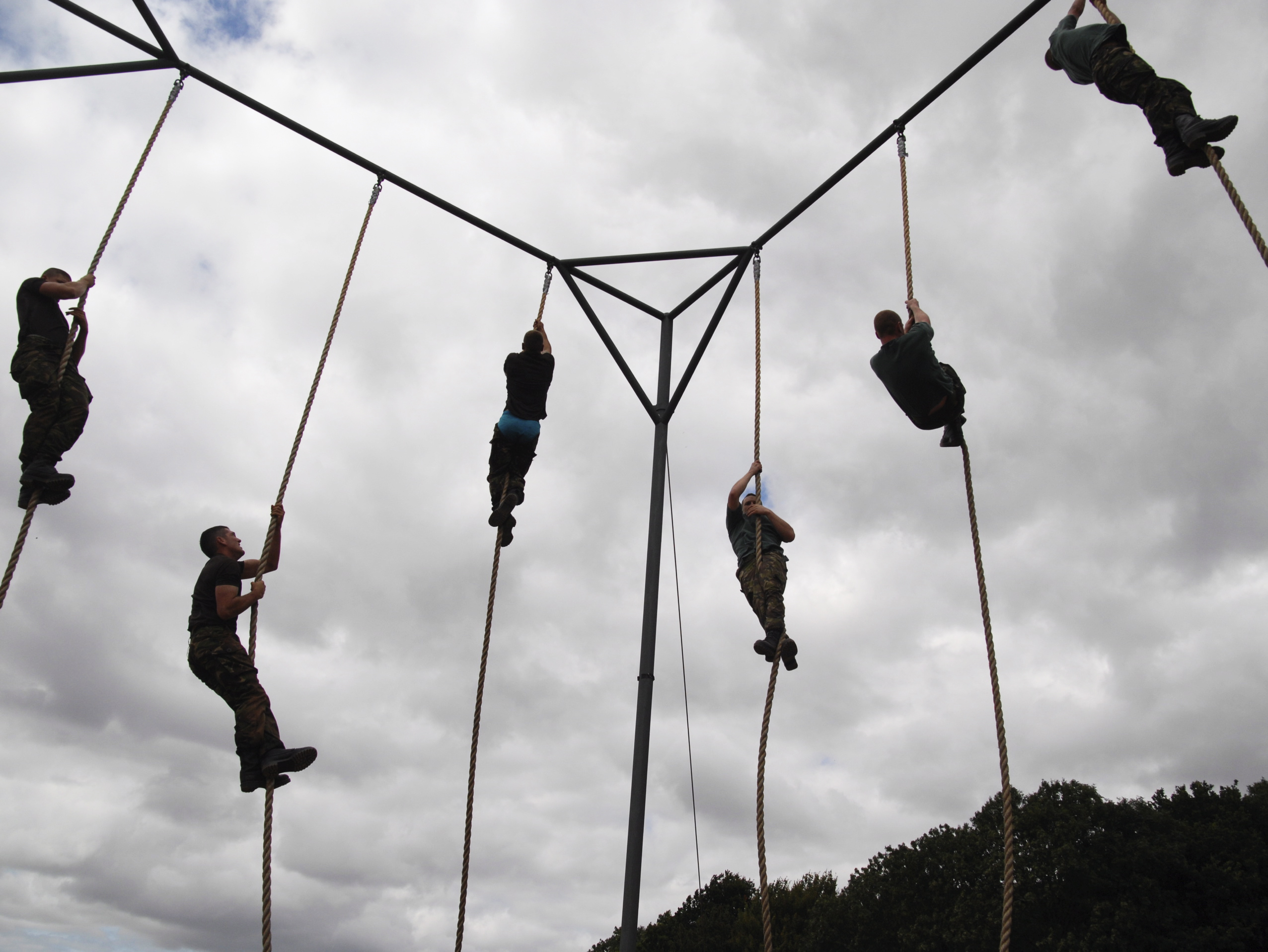
Royal Marine Recruits Rope Climbing at the Commando Training Centre

CTCRM is under the full command of Fleet Commander and responsible for providing commando trained officers and other ranks for the front line. CTCRM is overseen by the Commandant CTCRM, a colonel, Royal Marines. CTCRM is structured with three training wings (Command Wing, Commando Training Wing and Specialist Wing) each with its own commanding officer.

== Courses ==
Candidates who wish to become Other Ranks are required to pass Recruit Orientation Phase (ROP) of two weeks before beginning the mainstream 32 weeks training. Before they start ROP they undergo academic, medical and interview assessments. New entry training for Royal Marines other ranks (culminating in a month long "commando course") is undertaken at CTCRM, at Dartmoor, and at Woodbury Common, Devon, and is conducted over thirty-two weeks. Candidates who pass the commando course receive the award of the green beret, the distinguishing mark of a commando.

Those who wish to become Royal Marine Officers must pass the Potential Officers Course (POC). This is a four-day course that assesses physical and academic ability. Those who pass this and then perform well at the Admiralty Interview Board (AIB) will be offered a place on the Young Officer Training course. This course lasts 15 months, of which 34 weeks are spent at CTCRM and the remainder at Britannia Royal Naval College and on the West Coast of Scotland. CTCRM delivers new entry training to an average of 800 recruits a year. Specialist Wing trains Royal Marines and non-commissioned officers in a wide variety of specialisations e.g. platoon weapons instructors, mountain leaders, communications and information technology specialists.

== Lympstone Commando ==
CTCRM is served by Lympstone Commando railway station on the "Avocet Line".

== Cadets ==
CTCRM is the home of Lympstone Division Royal Marines Volunteer Cadet Corps, which is open to boys and girls aged 9 to 16 (who can serve until aged 18) from the local south east Devon area.
