= Avocet Line =

Railway line in Devon, England

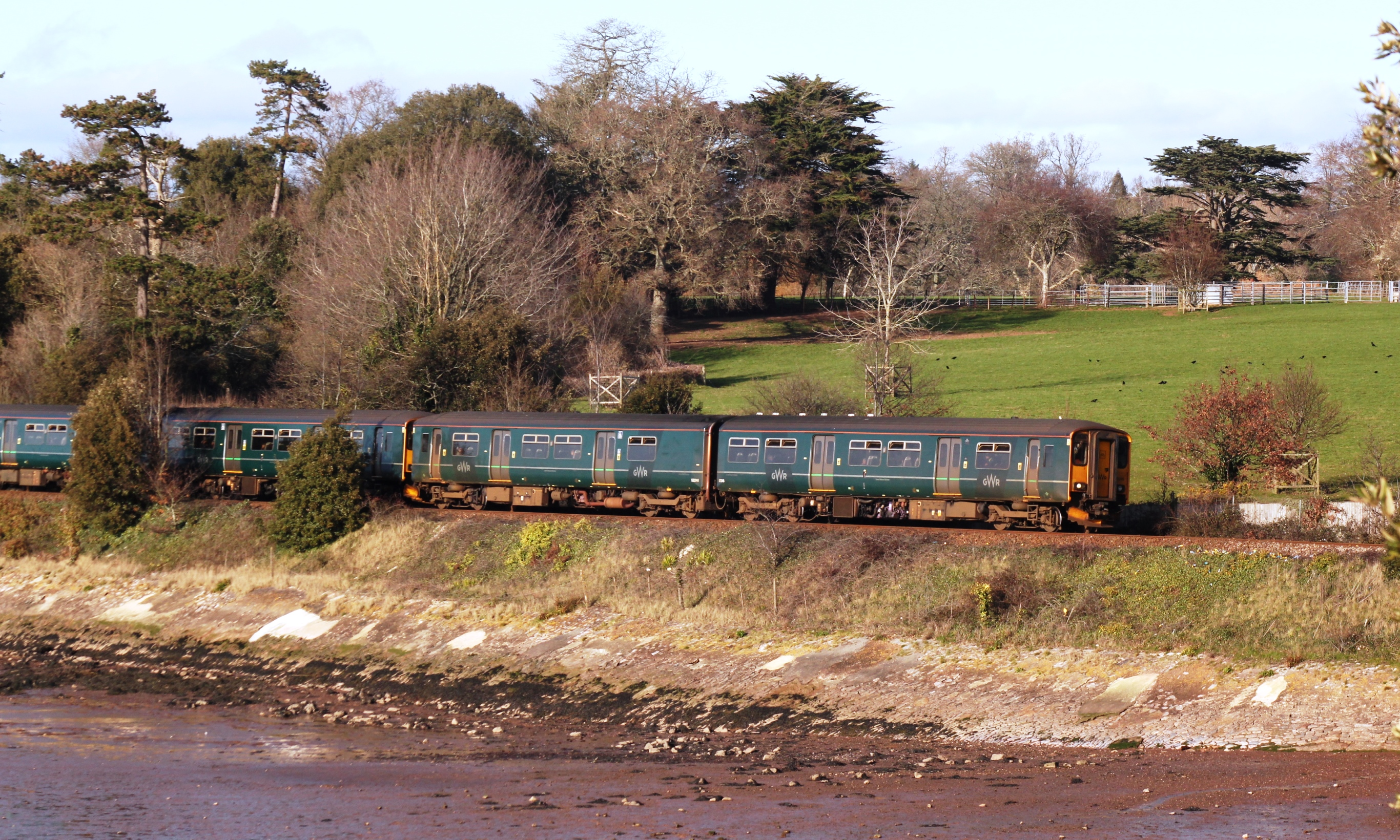
- Alongside the River Exe near Lympstone

Overview
- Status: Open
- Owner: Network Rail
- Locale: Devon
- Termini: Exeter St Davids 50.7290°N 3.5436°W; Exmouth 50.6216°N 3.4150°W
- Stations: 11
- Website: https://www.avocetline.org.uk/

Service
- Type: Heavy rail
- System: National Rail
- Operator: Great Western Railway
- Depot: Exeter
- Rolling stock: 150, 158, 165, 166
- Ridership: 2.629 million (2023)

History
- Opened: 1861

Technical
- Line length: 11 1/4 miles (18 km)
- Number of tracks: 1 or 2
- Character: Commuter
- Track gauge: 4 ft 8 1/2 in (1,435 mm) standard gauge
- Loading gauge: RA6 / W6A
- Operating speed: 70 mph (110 km/h)
Route map
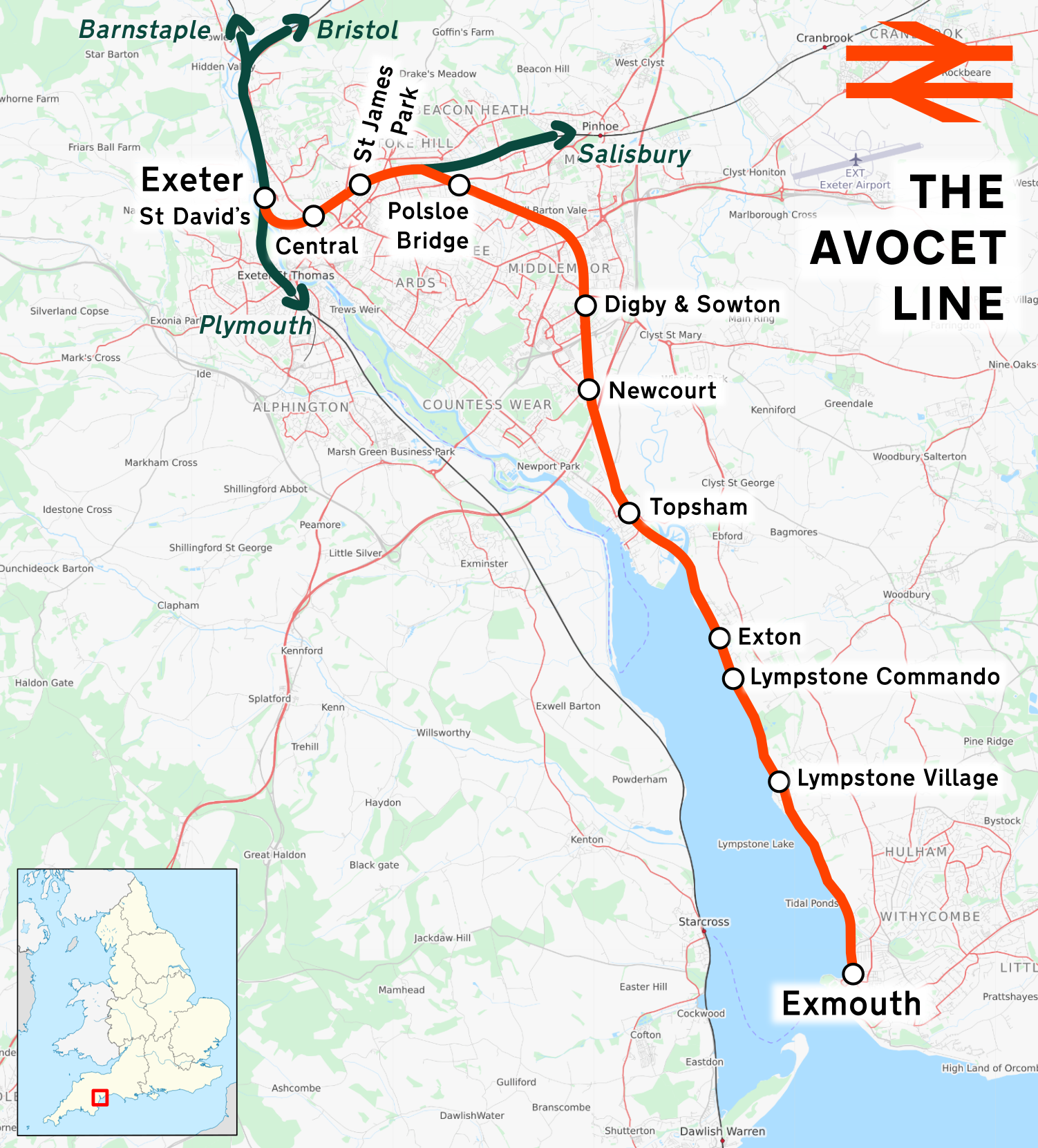

The Avocet Line is the railway line in Devon, England connecting Exeter with Exmouth. Originally built as the Exmouth branch railway by the London and South Western Railway, it is now is operated by Great Western Railway.

The line is 11 1/4 miles (18 km) long and follows edge of the Exe Estuary for about 4 miles (6 km) between Topsham and Exmouth. The line is named after the pied avocet, a distinctive black and white wading bird that is a seasonal visitor to the estuary.

== History ==
The Exmouth branch line was constructed in 1861 in two portions by two railway companies but always worked as a single branch with trains from Exeter Queen Street to Exmouth.

=== Early proposals ===
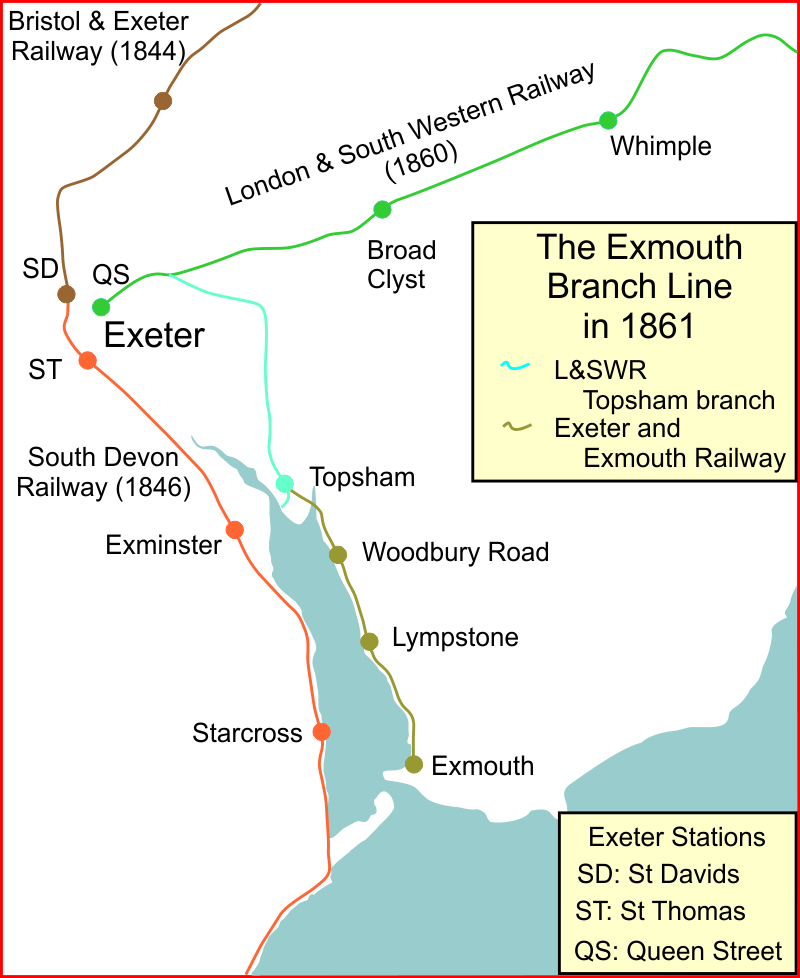
Railways around the Exe in 1861, Exeter top left and Exmouth bottom right

Exeter lies on the River Exe in Devon, but the river is too shallow for ships to reach the city. Exmouth, 11 miles (18 km) further south on the east bank of the river at its mouth saw some goods transhipped onto smaller boats or road carts which could complete the journey to Exeter. Topsham, also on the eastern bank of the river and only 4 miles (6.4 km) from Exeter, developed as a better place to tranship loads from smaller ships. The Exeter Ship Canal was built close to the west side of the river in the sixteenth century to allow shipping to reach the city. Use of the canal was inconvenient and limited to small vessels, even after many enlargements in the following 200 years. The merchants of Exeter held a meeting to discuss the possibility of building a railway connection from Exmouth to the city as early as 1825. At this date there were no other railways nearby so there was no thought of connecting the line to a network. However the proposal — estimated to cost £50,000 — was discontinued when the Corporation of the City of Exeter agreed to extend the canal southwards to Turf, opposite Topsham, enabling 400 ton vessels to reach the head of the canal by passing a difficult reach of the river channel.

The first suggestion of a railway between Exeter and Exmouth was proposed as early as 1825. No progress was made but in the 1840s the South Devon Railway (SDR) opened from Exeter along the other side of the Exe Estuary. This was the time of the Railway Mania when many new railways were proposed. Two were aimed at Exmouth; an Exeter, Topsham and Exmouth Railway or a Great Western and Exeter, Topsham and Exmouth Junction Railway (from Exeter St Davids, or an alternative route from the SDR at Exminster which would have been carried over the canal and the estuary on a 14-span viaduct to Topsham).

Exeter and Exmouth Railway Act 1846
- Act of Parliament
- Parliament of the United Kingdom
- Long title: An Act for making a Railway from Exeter to Exmouth, to be called "The Exeter and Exmouth Railway."
- Citation: 9 & 10 Vict. c. cxxix

Dates
- Royal assent: 3 July 1846

The Exeter and Exmouth Railway gained parliamentary approval through the Exeter and Exmouth Railway Act 1846 (9 & 10 Vict. c. cxxix) on 3 July 1846. This would have been one of the local railways supported by the London and South Western Railway (L&SWR) in its expansion westwrds, but lack of progress after the Railway Mania saw most of these fail or delayed.

=== Exeter and Exmouth Railway ===
Exeter and Exmouth Railway Act 1855
- Act of Parliament
- Parliament of the United Kingdom
- Long title: An Act for making Railways from the South Devon Railway to Exmouth, and to the Basin of the Exeter Canal, to be called The Exeter and Exmouth Railway.
- Citation: 18 & 19 Vict. c. cxxii

Dates
- Royal assent: 2 July 1855

Other legislation
- Repealed by: Exeter and Exmouth Railway Act 1858

Status: Repealed

Text of statute as originally enacted

Fresh proposals for these routes were presented in the 1850s. The SDR route from Exminster succeeded in parliament and the Exeter and Exmouth Railway Act 1855 (18 & 19 Vict. c. cxxii) was passed on 2 July 1855.

It shall be lawful for the Company to make and maintain the Railways herein-after mentioned, together with all proper Works and Conveniences connected therewith and Approaches thereto; (that is to say,)

- A Railway (in this Act called. "the Main Line") to commence by a Junction with the Line of the South Devon Railway in the Parish of Exminster in the County of Devon, and to terminate at or near the Town of Exmcuth in the same County:
- A Railway (in this Act called "the Branch") to commence by a Junction with the South Devon Railway in the Parish of Alphington in the County of Devon, and to terminate at or near the West End of the Basin of the Exeter Canal in the Parish of Saint Thomas the Apostle in the same County.
— Section 17, Exeter and Exmouth Railway Act 1855 (18 & 19 Vict. c. cxxii)

Exeter and Exmouth Railway Act 1858
- Act of Parliament
- Parliament of the United Kingdom
- Long title: An Act for authorizing the Abandonment of Part of the authorized Line of the Exeter and Exmouth Railway, and the making, instead of the Part so abandoned, of an Extension of the Main Line of the Railway; and for reducing and regulating the Capital and Borrowing Powers of the Exeter and Exmouth Railway Company; and for other Purposes.
- Citation: 21 & 22 Vict. c. lvi

Dates
- Royal assent: 28 June 1858

Exeter and Exmouth Railway Act 1861
- Act of Parliament
- Parliament of the United Kingdom
- Long title: An Act for enabling the Exeter and Exmouth Railway Company to regulate their Capital, to raise further Capital; and for other Purposes connected with their Undertaking.
- Citation: 24 & 25 Vict. c. xv

Dates
- Royal assent: 17 May 1861

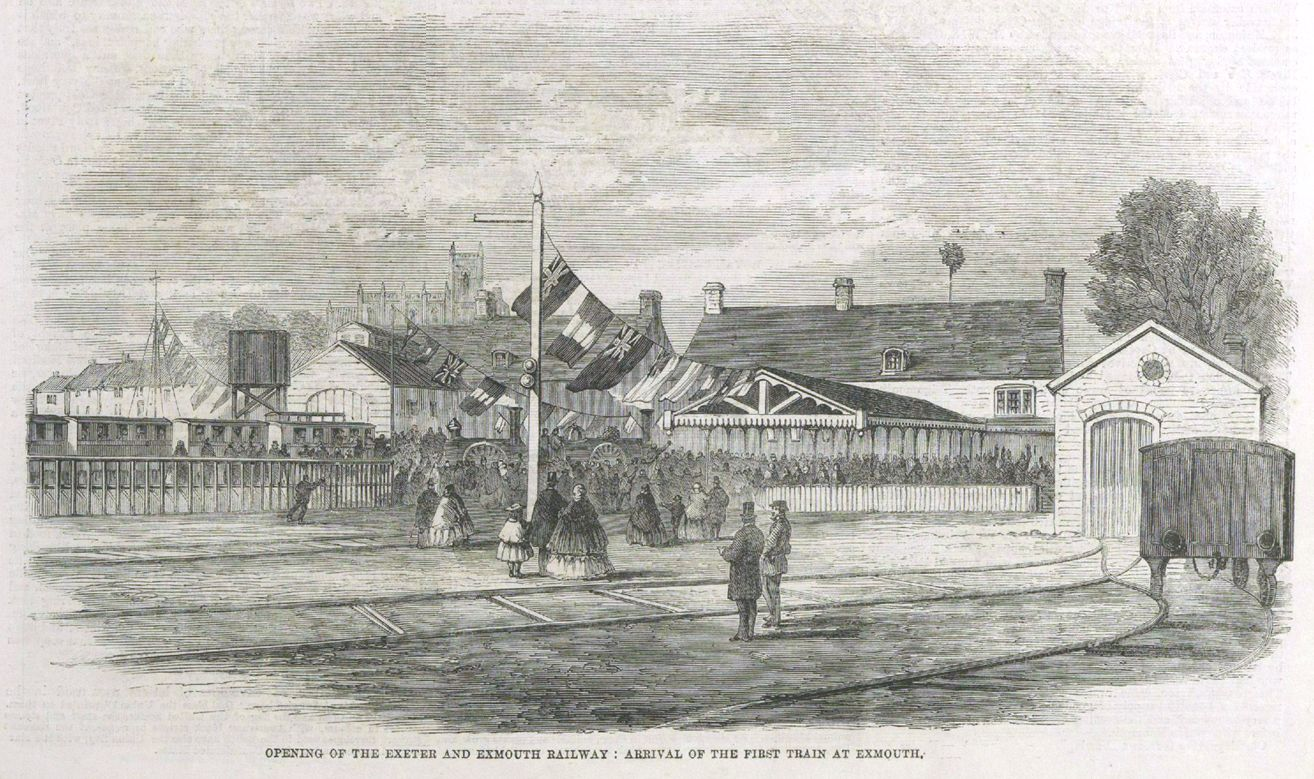
The first train arrives at Exmouth in 1861

Construction of the line had already when on 1 August 1857 the directors of the company announced that they had arranged with the Bristol and Exeter Railway (BER) and the SDR to lease their line for ten years at £3,000 per annum. However the shareholders appointed a committee to review the work. The committee reported back and rejected the lease to the BER and SDR interest. Instead they and recommended altering the route of the line to join the anticipated route of the L&SWR that was being built to Exeter. That company undertook to make a branch line between Exeter and Topsham where it would link with the already authorised Exeter and Exmouth Railway from there to Exmouth. These changes were authorised in the Exeter and Exmouth Railway Act 1858 (21 & 22 Vict. c. lvi) which was obtained on 28 June 1858. The L&SWR's authority to build the section from Exmouth Junction to Topsham was obtained by the South Western Railway (Works and Capital) Act 1858 (21 & 22 Vict. c. lxxxix) on 12 July 1858. The Exeter and Exmouth Company had to return to parliament for additional capital, which was authorised in the Exeter and Exmouth Railway Act 1861 (24 & 25 Vict. c. xv) which was obtained on 17 May 1861.

Bridges and stations were designed by William Tite; the engineer of the line was W. R. Galbraith and the contractor for Topsham to Exmouth was James Taylor of Exeter. The line was opened in 1861; as well as Topsham and Exmouth there were intermediate stations at Woodbury Road and Lympstone. The first train was pulled by the 2-2-2 Beattie well tank no. 36 Comet. It left Exeter Queen Streeton 1 May 1861 at 7.46 a.m. with 11 coaches and about 150 passengers. The journey to Exmouth took about half an hour. At first there were five trains each way seven days a week, increased to seven trains each way (but four on Sundays) from 1 July in the opening year.

A line was opened on 22 September 1861 from Topsham station down to a quay on the River Exe. It was 32 chains (640 m; 700 yd) long and dropped steeply, the maximum gradient being 1 in 38.

=== London and South Western Railway (1866 to 1922) ===
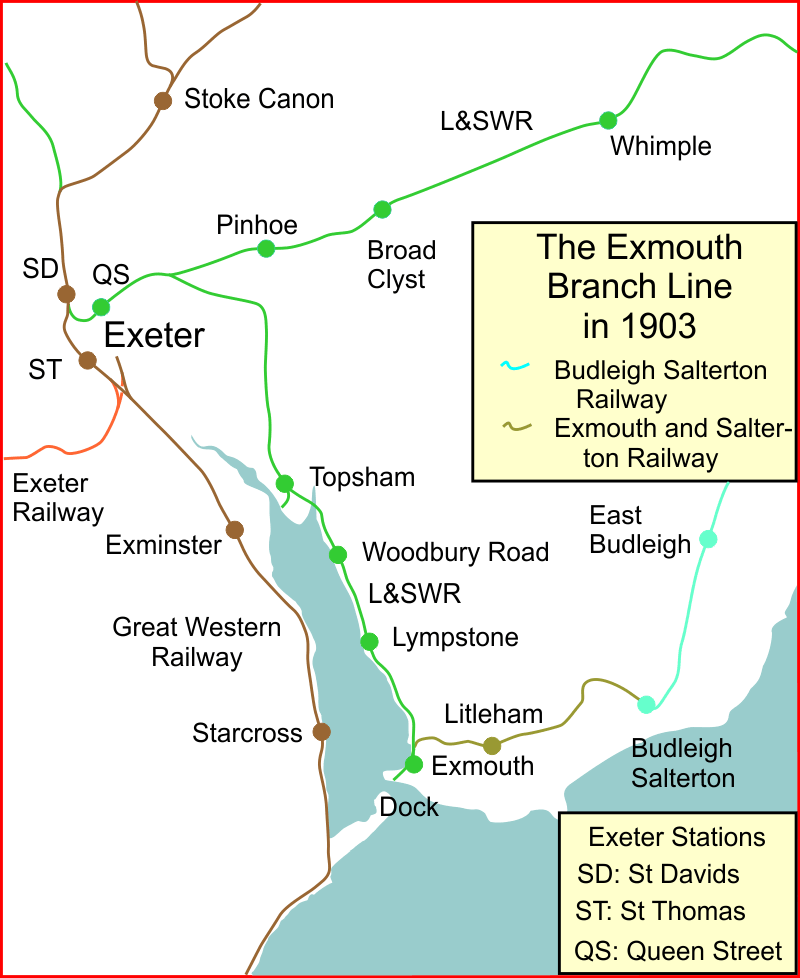
Railways around the Exe in 1903, Exeter top left and Exmouth bottom right

The train services was worked throughout by the L&SWR. That company was authorised to take over the Exeter and Exmouth Railway Company by the South-western Railway (General) Act 1865 (28 & 29 Vict. c. ccciv) of 5 July 1865 and this took effect from 1 January 1866. A siding was laid from the goods yard at Exmouth in 1864 to where a new dock was being constructed. It was brought into general use for goods traffic in 1868.

By the summer of 1887 the service to Exmouth had increased to 10 with 11 towards Exeter. A limited non-stop service between Exeter and Exmouth was provided in 1905, the journey taking just 18 minutes.

A new route to Exmouth was opened in 1903. It connected with the Budleigh Salterton Railway and gave a through route to Sidmouth Junction on the main line between London and Exeter. Plans to enlarge the station were set out in 1916 but were delayed due to World War I The line between Exmouth Junction and Topsham was doubled from 31 May 1908.

From 1906 the L&SWR introduced steam railmotors between Exeter and Honiton on the main line, as a response to the competitive threat from street tramways in the city. Two new halts were was opened on 26 January 1906 on the main line between Exeter and Exmouth Junction. Lions Holt (renamed St James' Park Halt on 6 October 1946) and Mount Pleasant Road Halt (closed 2 January 1928). These were initially served by steam railmotors to Honiton but additional railmotor services between Exeter and Topsham were introduced from 1 June 1908. Two additional halts were opened on the same day. Polsloe Bridge Halt was immediately on the Exmouth side of Exmouth Junction and Clyst St Mary & Digby Halt was further south.

=== Southern Railway (1923 to 1947) ===
By 1923 the train service from Exeter to Exmouth had increased to 20; in 1937 it was 27 with 19 on Sundays. Extra trains known locally as 'sandhoppers' were provided at short notice on summer Sundays.

The long overdue reconstruction of Exmouth station was completed on 20 July 1924. It now had four platform tracks and a new two-storey station building. Other work at about this time saw the goods yard expand onto land reclaimed from the estuary and a new goods shed.

The short wooden platforms at Polsloe Bridge were replaced in 1927 by longer platforms made of concrete sections cast at the company's concrete factory at Exmouth Junction. Rebuilding of Queen Street station in Exeter was completed in 1933. The main platforms were now much longer but a bay platform was retained for Exmouth services. The station was renamed Exeter Central at this time.

=== British Rail and later ===
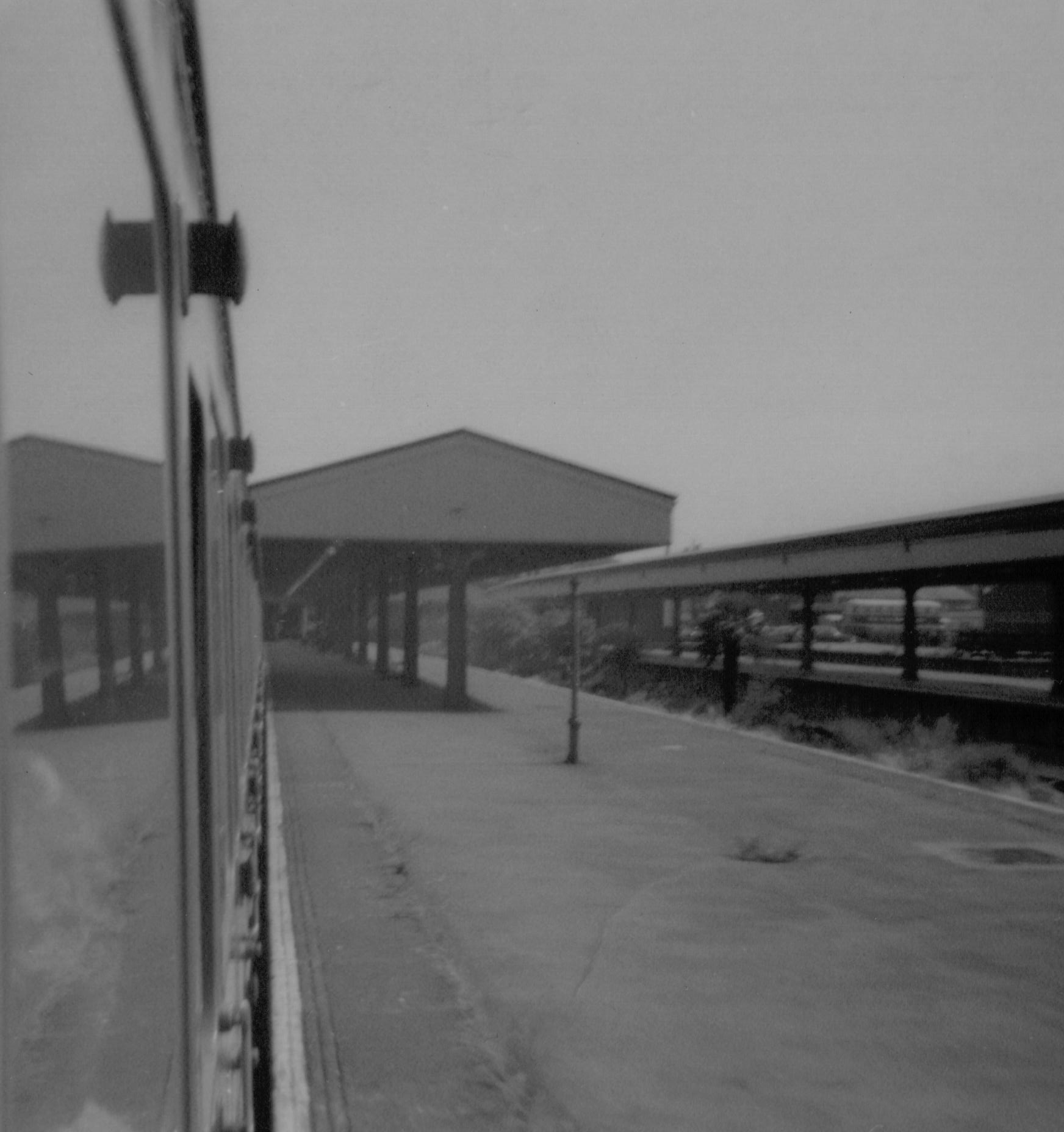
Exmouth station in 1969, four platforms but now just one in use for a DMU service from Exeter

The wooden platforms at Clyst St Mary & Digby Halt needed to be replaced but this was not possible with more important work needed elsewhere after World War II so it was closed in September 1948. Woodbury Road was renamed Exton on 15 September 1958.

The train service had increased by 1957 to 30 on weekdays and 17 on Sundays. Non-stop expresses were reintroduced in 1960. Diesel multiple units were introduced on the branch from 15 July 1963 and this allowed some through services to operate as far as Kingswear or Plymouth.

The Budleigh Salterton line from Exmouth closed on 6 March 1967 and Exmouth signal box was closed on 3 March 1968 leaving just one platform left in use. It was intended to reduce the whole branch to just a single track in 1967 but the engineer did not have resources to do this until 5 February 1973. A passing loop was retained at Topsham to allow trains to pass. General goods traffic ceased and the line to Exmouth Dock closed in December 1967. The level crossing at Topsham was modernised with lifting barriers in May 1973 but the signal box was closed on 30 January 1988 with control of the level crossing and all trains on the branch transferred to Exmouth Junction.

Exmouth station was rebuilt in 1976, trains using just the north end of one shortened platform from 2 May and a new station building provided. A new station was opened the following day, 3 May 1976, called Lympstone Commando to serve the Commando Training Centre Royal Marines . The existing Lympstone station was renamed Lympstone Village on 13 May 1991 to reduce confusion. From May 1977 most trains ran beyond Exeter Central to Exeter St Davids.

Digby & Sowton was opened on 23 May 1995 near the site of the earlier Clyst St Mary & Digby Halt. Newcourt railway station opened between Digby & Sowton and Topsham on 4 June 2015.

The route is supported by the Avocet Line Rail Users Group but is not designated as a community railway.

== Route ==
The northern part of the line is in the city of Exeter, providing a service to suburbs in the eastern part of the city such as Whipton and newer developments at Digby, Sowton and Newcourt. The station at Topsham is the last in Exeter, beyond this the line crosses the River Clyst and then follows the eastern side of the Exe Estuary through Exton and Lympstone to reach Exmouth.

The first 1 mile 65 chains (2.9 km; 1.81 mi) of the route from Exeter St Davids as far as Exmouth Junction is double track and shared with the West of England Main Line. After diverging from the main line, the branch to Exmouth is single except for a passing loop at Topsham. The signal box at Exmouth Junction controls all trains between there and Exmouth. Mileposts on the branch are measured from a zero point 1 chain onto the branch at Exmouth Junction.

Exeter St Davids was the first station in the city (it opened in 1844) and is the largest, with connections to long distance services west to Penzance, east to London Paddington, and north Bristol Temple Meads and beyond. Avocet Line services are able to use platforms 1 and 3. Immediately outside the station, the line starts to rise at 1 in 36. Special signalling arrangements ensure that trains do not come to a stand on this steep climb, and safety equipment prevents a train running away into the station should its brakes fail. After passing through the 184 yd (168 m) St Daid's Tunnel, the line reaches Exeter Central (62 ch (1.2 km; 0.78 mi) from St Davids). This is a busier station because of its central location; the main entrance is on Queen Street but there is another entrance on New North Road at the other end of the platforms.

A short distance beyond Exeter Central is St James Park (1 mi 20 ch (2.0 km; 1.25 mi) from St Davids). The station's short platforms are in a cutting next to St James Park, the home ground of Exeter City F.C.. Just beyond this station is Blackboy Tunnel (262 yd (240 m)). Mount Pleasant Road Halt was between the tunnel and Exmouth Junction (1 mi 65 ch (2.9 km; 1.81 mi))) where the signal box stands between the Avocet Line and the West of England Line. The current building was opened on 17 November 1959..

Now on the Exmouth branch, the first station is Polsloe Bridge (2 mi 20 ch (3.6 km; 2.25 mi) from St Davids). This stands on an embankment where there used to be two tracks but now just the down line (on the right) remains although the old up platform is still in place.. Next stop is Digby & Sowton (4 mi 06 ch (6.6 km; 4.08 mi)) which opened in 1995 but is now one of the busiest stations in Devon. It serves local offices and a park and ride bus service to the local hospital. It is also promoted as the station for Sandy Park where the Exeter Chiefs rugby club play. The club helped the construction of a footpath between the station and their ground, including paying for a footbridge over the A379 road. The next station is the newest on the line; Newcourt opened in 2015 (4 mi 72 ch (7.9 km; 4.90 mi)). It serves a housing development and offers a better route to Sandy Park for passengers coming from the Exmouth direction.

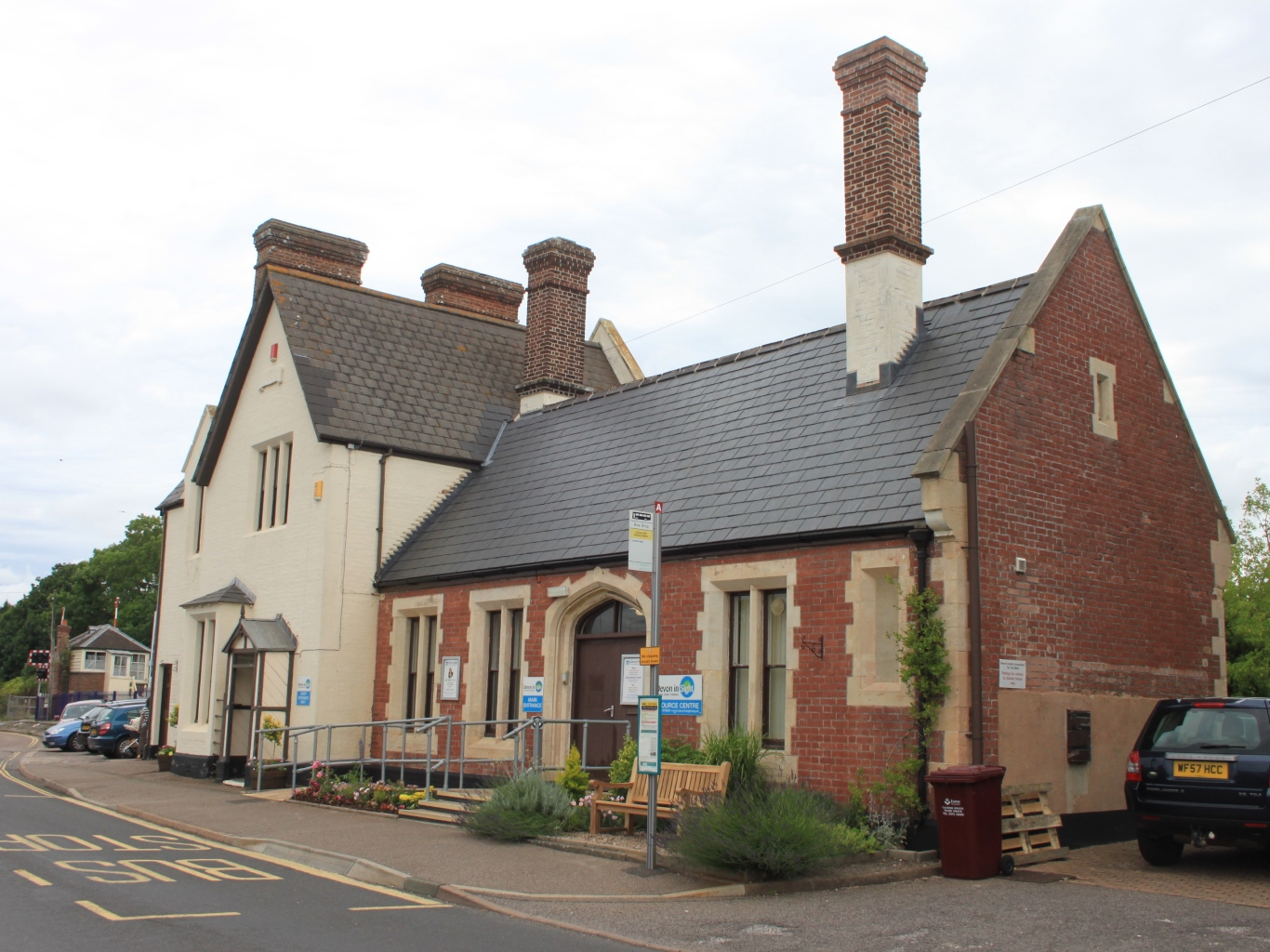
Topsham in 2015

At Topsham (6 mi 12 ch (9.9 km; 6.15 mi) from Exeter St Davids) there is a passing loop. The original station building which was designed by William Tite still stands on the Exeter-bound platform although it is no longer used by the railway. They are both Grade II listed buildings. At the north end of the southbound platform is a small station garden where the station name has been presented in topiary since 1947.

Leaving Topsham, the line leaves Exeter and descends towards river level. It crosses the River Clyst on the 114 yd (104 m) River Clyst Viaduct and the arrives at Exton (7 mi 53 ch (12.3 km; 7.66 mi) from Exeter St Davids) where the platform gives views across the railway track to the Exe Estuary. The building behind the platform used to be the station master's house. Continuing alongside the estuary, the next station is Lympstone Commando (8 mi 13 ch (13.1 km; 8.16 mi)) which is for the use of people travelling to and from the Commando Training Centre Royal Marines. The public station at Lympstone Village (9 mi 14 ch (14.8 km; 9.18 mi)) is above road level away from the shore.

The terminus at Exmouth (11 mi 18 ch (18.1 km; 11.23 mi) from Exeter St Davids) is the shortened remains of the long platform built in 1924 with a small modern ticket office that opened in 1976. The car park between the station and the estuary is the site of the station's goods yard and the busy road on the landward side has taken the space of the stations other platforms.

== Services ==
There are 37 services per day during the week but fewer at the weekend. This gives a typical daytime frequency of every 30 minutes with most trains extended beyond Exeter to and from Paignton. Trains only stop once an hour at St James Park, Polsloe Bridge, Exton and Lympstone Commando, the latter two being request stops. It is operated by Great Western Railway.

== Passenger volume ==
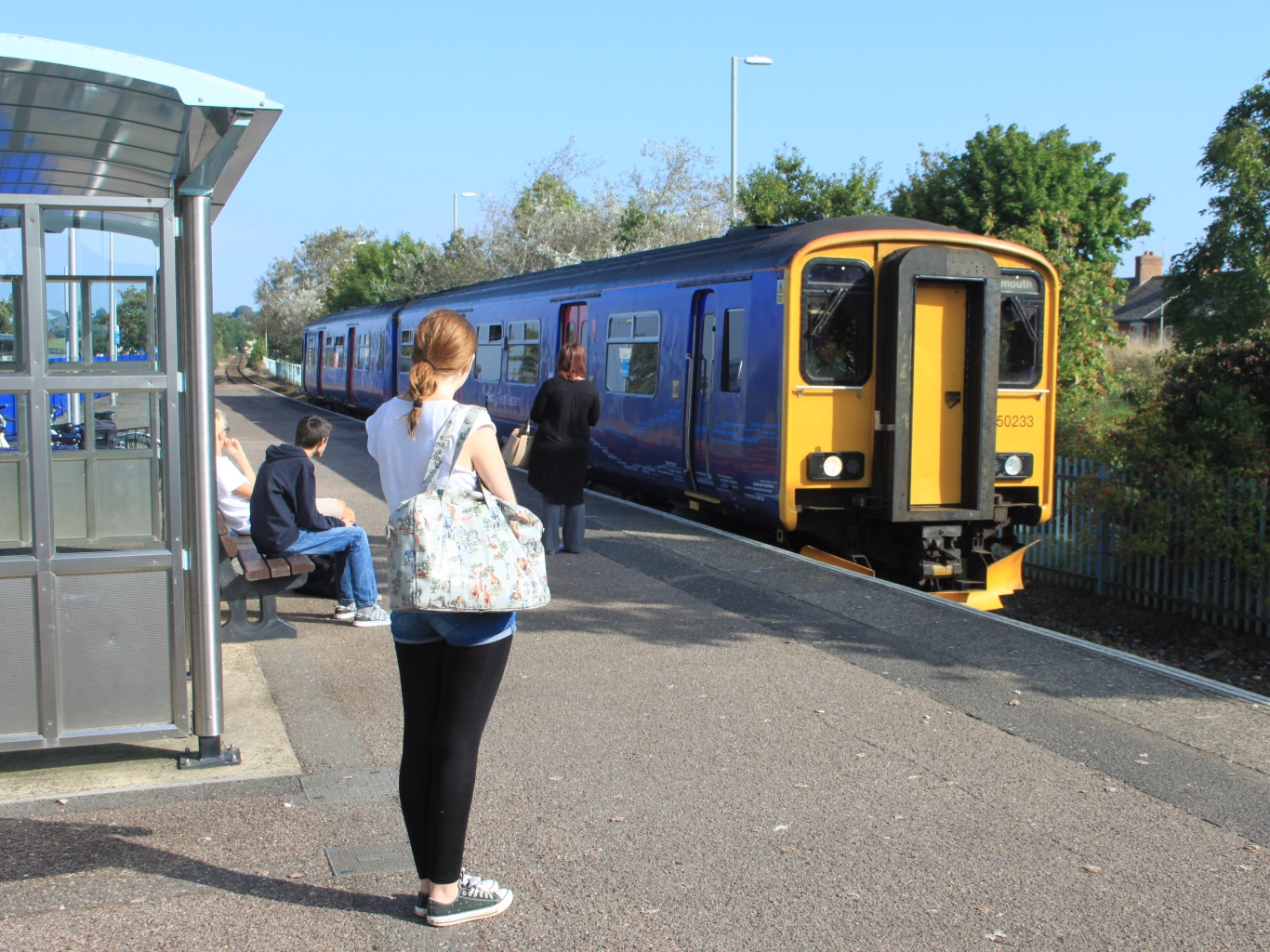
Passengers at Exmouth

Exeter Central has the greatest number of people entering and exiting at any station in Devon, around 3,000,000 each year. Exeter St Davids records slightly fewer entries and exits but is much busier when the passengers changing trains are counted. The busiest station served only by Avocet Line trains is Exmouth. Tickets issued and collected at Exmouth in 1928 totalled 615,386 and were about 625,000 in the early 1960s. By the 2008–2009 accounting year entries and exits there were 731,866 and have increased to nearly 1,000,000 entries and exits by the 2024–2025 accounting year. Digby & Sowton had about 276,000 in 2008–2009 but this has more than tripled since then with more than 900,000 in 2024–25.

Travel restrictions during the COVID-19 pandemic resulted in a significant reduction in passengers. Exmouth dropped from nearly 900,000 in 2019–2020 to less than 328,000 in 2020–2021; Exton, the quietest station on the branch, dropped from 27,428 to just 7,158. Passenger numbers quickly returned to pre-COVID levels at most Avocet Line stations when the restrictions were removed. Three stations exceeded their pre-COVID volumes within a year, and by the 2024–2025 accounting year all stations were exceeding them except for Exton and Lympstone Village.

Station usage
Station name	2002–03	2004–05	2005–06	2006–07	2007–08	2008–09	2009–10	2010–11	2011–12	2012–13	2013–14	2014–15	2015–16	2016–17	2017–18	2018–19	2019–20	2020–21	2021–22	2022–23	2023–24	2024–25
St James Park	27,233	27,477	27,428	31,716	36,354	43,348	46,754	55,910	61,092	64,984	66,330	64,586	72,712	87,804	84,214	88,760	96,282	34,950	105,674	122,814	142,508	145,446
Polsloe Bridge	45,879	43,788	43,773	51,264	54,094	62,722	70,038	83,598	99,272	104,168	106,604	116,552	120,826	129,836	125,146	120,678	119,048	42,680	130,298	159,258	182,510	188,694
Digby & Sowton	120,505	134,804	155,822	201,954	247,452	275,978	271,316	310,216	374,488	742,622	772,878	571,510	561,188	588,944	630,560	666,324	624,496	299,226	570,460	890,980	804,202	968,412
Newcourt	—N/a	—N/a	—N/a	—N/a	—N/a	—N/a	—N/a	—N/a	—N/a	—N/a	—N/a	—N/a	59,410	99,394	114,036	129,380	120,460	38,944	108,924	145,908	158,438	154,772
Topsham	105,717	127,903	138,905	156,153	172,818	183,006	186,056	199,484	221,196	221,050	221,332	231,122	231,660	250,282	249,628	238,500	229,474	67,918	206,696	227,632	260,064	300,338
Exton	12,059	10,583	10,255	11,505	12,214	14,790	15,834	19,312	20,176	19,458	20,774	23,078	22,400	25,610	24,886	27,302	27,428	7,158	20,082	23,370	25,872	25,256
Lympstone Commando	70,940	55,875	62,141	64,024	57,766	65,156	60,558	47,660	38,590	39,038	55,910	54,972	54,026	64,690	61,450	64,294	69,846	19,050	76,134	83,160	79,010	86,996
Lympstone Village	64,361	63,325	66,739	70,890	67,583	80,338	77,700	84,206	87,478	95,084	93,978	99,052	105,738	115,526	107,810	101,022	97,510	27,330	71,054	83,042	91,520	92,994
Exmouth	735,674	623,832	611,451	677,036	697,339	731,866	722,922	779,130	825,740	872,396	892,744	927,182	924,112	960,370	962,008	946,880	896,248	327,720	807,310	898,376	916,968	999,764
The annual passenger usage is based on sales of tickets in stated financial years from Office of Rail and Road estimates of station usage. The statistics are for passengers arriving and departing from each station and cover twelve-month periods that start in April. Methodology may vary year on year. Usage since the period 2019–20 have been affected by the COVID-19 pandemic, especially the period 2020–23.
