= Lympstone =

Village in Devon, England

Coordinates: 50.6460°N 3.4298°W

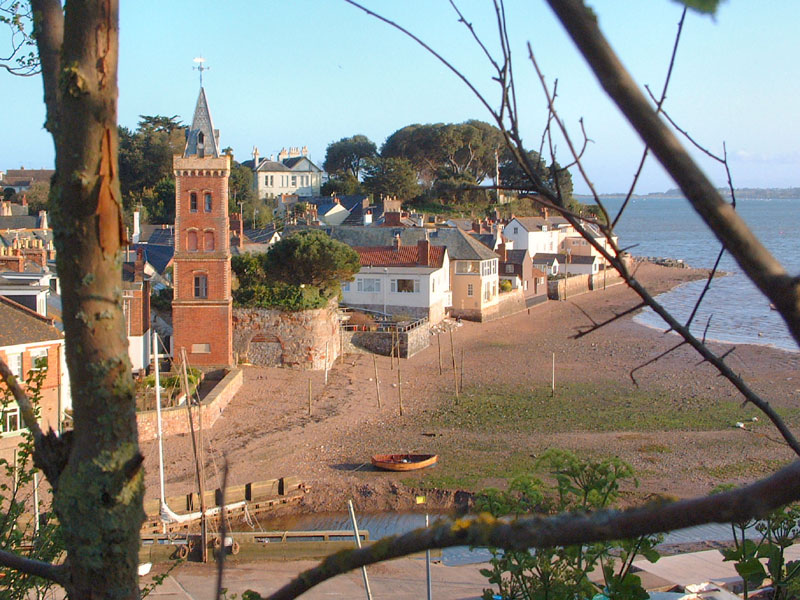
- Lympstone river frontage from Cliff Field: Peter's Tower and the traditional washing poles on the beach are visible

- Location within Devon
- Population: 2,117 (2021 Census)
- OS grid reference: SX990839
- Civil parish: Lympstone
- District: East Devon
- Shire county: Devon
- Region: South West
- Country: England
- Sovereign state: United Kingdom
- Post town: EXMOUTH
- Postcode district: EX8
- Dialling code: 01395
- Police: Devon and Cornwall
- Fire: Devon and Somerset
- Ambulance: South Western
- UK Parliament: Exmouth and Exeter East

Lympstone is a village and civil parish in East Devon, in the English county of Devon. It lies on the eastern bank of the River Exe estuary, approximately 2 mi (3.2 km) north-west of Exmouth and 11 mi (18 km) south-east of Exeter. The parish had a population of 2,117 at the 2021 census.

The village has a small harbour on the Exe estuary, situated at the outlet of Wotton Brook between cliffs of red breccia. The promontory to the north of the harbour is topped by Cliff Field, a flat pasture managed by the National Trust and used for football matches and local events.

Lympstone is served by the Avocet Line via Lympstone Village railway station, with services running between Exmouth and Exeter.

The village is known for Peter's Tower, an Italianate riverside clock tower built around 1885 by W.H. Peters as a memorial to his wife, and for its longstanding tradition of residents drying washing on the foreshore. The riverside houses back directly onto the shore without a continuous seawall, and access passages between them and the beach are fitted with metal flood gates closed during high tides via a local warning system.

Lympstone hosts the annual Furry Dance on the first Saturday in August, a village tradition involving processions in fancy dress accompanied by a brass band, which attracts visitors from across the region.

Lympstone Manor (formerly Courtlands House) is a historic country house overlooking the Exe estuary which now operates as a hotel and restaurant.

The parish church is the Church of the Nativity of the Blessed Virgin Mary, Lympstone, which forms a central historic landmark within the village.

Near the village is the Commando Training Centre Royal Marines (CTCRM), the principal training establishment of the Royal Marines. The centre is served by the private Lympstone Commando railway station (not open to the public) on the Exeter–Exmouth branch line.

== History ==
=== Early history ===
Archaeological evidence indicates human activity in the Lympstone area from at least the 3rd century AD. A Roman coin from the reign of Gordian III (AD 238–244) was discovered in 1879 in the churchyard, and a silver antoninianus of Philip the Arab (AD 244–249) was later found near Underhill.

The earliest documentary reference to Lympstone appears in the Domesday Book (1086), where it is recorded as Leuestona:

Richard son of Earl Giselbert has a manor called Leuestona which Saward held on the day on which King Edward was alive and dead and it rendered geld for one hide and one virgate. This can be ploughed by eight ploughs. William Capra holds this of Richard. Of this ten villeins and six bordars and two serfs return eight pounds to William in ferm. And when Richard received this manor it was worth ten pounds.

A later notable lord of the manor was William de Tracy, one of the four knights involved in the killing of Thomas Becket, Archbishop of Canterbury.

=== Medieval period ===
In 1329, the first recorded reference to a church at Lympstone occurs when the rector, Richard de Doune, petitioned Bishop John Grandisson to postpone the consecration of a partially rebuilt structure. The present Church of the Nativity of the Blessed Virgin Mary was later consecrated by Bishop Edmund Stafford on 24 September 1409. Substantial rebuilding took place between 1864 and 1867, leaving only the tower, chancel arch, two angels in the sanctuary, and the north arcade from the medieval fabric.

The manor of Lympstone passed through several prominent families during the medieval period. It was held for a time by the Abermarle family before being acquired by the Dynham family circa 1327, who established their seat at nearby Nutwell Court, then a fortified residence. In 1371, John Dynham (1318–1383) obtained a licence for a private chapel at Nutwell.

During the Wars of the Roses, in 1459, Edward, Earl of March (later Edward IV), together with the Duke of Warwick and members of the Neville family, is believed to have taken refuge either at Gulliford hunting lodge or Nutwell Castle before John Dynham, 1st Baron Dynham financed their escape to Calais.

=== Early modern period ===
From the late 16th century, the manor became associated with the Drake family. Sir Francis Drake is traditionally said to have visited Gulliford hunting lodge, an association sometimes linked to a surviving Californian poppy fresco. The manor was later leased to Sir Francis Drake, 3rd Baronet, whose father-in-law, Sir Henry Pollexfen, purchased Nutwell Court in 1685.

Following subsequent inheritance, the estate passed to Anne Pollexfen-Drake, who married George Augustus Eliott, 1st Baron Heathfield in 1748. In 1802, the manor was formally purchased by the 2nd Baron Heathfield. He was succeeded by his nephew, Thomas Fuller-Eliott-Drake, who adopted the additional surnames Elliott and Drake. The Fuller-Eliott-Drake family remained lords of the manor until 1938, when the death of Lady Seaton left the succession unresolved and no effective inheritance was established.

Lympstone also has a documented history of smuggling and piracy. The pirate John Nutt is believed to have been born in the parish and may have operated locally. Oral traditions and local accounts refer to a network of underground tunnels, allegedly linking Sowden End Cliffs to Sowden House and Nutwell Beach to Gulliford Farm. Several houses in the village are also said to have contained hiding places for contraband. Smuggling activity had largely declined by the mid-19th century.

The village historically supported four public houses, which were frequently noted in local records. In 1826, the local magistrate complained to the Select Vestry that “greater irregularities were practiced in the two Public Houses in this Village than anywhere else in the neighbourhood.”

=== Modern period ===
On 12 June 1833, a major fire destroyed much of the village after a frying pan used to cook mackerel ignited a thatched roof. The fire spread rapidly, destroying 58 houses, including the parish workhouse, and leaving nearly 250 people homeless.

Modernisation efforts began in the late 19th century. A sanitary committee was established in 1871 and proposed a comprehensive sewerage system, though it initially faced local opposition. By September 1880, the sewer system had been completed. Street lighting proposals followed in 1884, but petroleum lamps were not installed until 1893, when 12 were introduced.

During the 20th century, Lympstone underwent significant residential expansion, particularly in Upper Lympstone. In 1940, land north of Nutwell was acquired for the establishment of the Commando Training Centre Royal Marines (CTCRM).

== Sport and leisure ==
Sailing and other watersports form a significant part of village life in Lympstone due to its location on the River Exe estuary. The village is home to Lympstone Sailing Club, established in 1947 and based in the harbour.

Lympstone A.F.C. was founded in 1895 and fields two senior teams in the Devon & Exeter Football League, as well as multiple youth teams ranging from under-7 to under-16 level competing in the Exeter & District Youth League.

The village was formerly home to Royal Marines A.F.C., a non-league football club based at Endurance Park, CTCRM, which folded in April 2012.

The Exeter–Exmouth cycle route passes through Lympstone and forms part of a popular commuting and recreational corridor between Exmouth and Exeter. Prior to its construction, cycling between the two settlements was largely restricted to the busy A376 road. The route passes through the village centre, contributing to local footfall in shops, cafés, and public houses, and has been the subject of local debate regarding safety and its impact on the village centre environment.

The 1st Lympstone Sea Scouts, established locally, celebrated its centenary in 2012 and maintains active Scout and Cub sections based at a headquarters on Cliff Field.

The village contains several public open spaces. Cliff Field is regularly used for informal recreation and organised football matches. Candy’s Field provides a playground, basketball court, and tennis facilities. A landscaped village green has also been created opposite the parish church.

Lympstone supports a range of cultural and recreational organisations. The Lympstone Players amateur dramatic society was founded in 1943 and has over 70 members. Other groups include an art society, film society, garden club, and youth organisations.

== Notable people ==
- Ralph Lane (c.1532–1603), courtier and soldier, was born in Lympstone. He served as equerry to Queen Elizabeth I and was a cousin of Catherine Parr. Lane accompanied Sir Walter Raleigh on his 1585 expedition to the New World and was involved in the attempted establishment of the Roanoke Colony. He later served in the defence against the Spanish Armada.
- Sir Francis Drake, 1st Baronet, owned the manor.
- John Nutt (before 1600 – after 1632), English pirate, is believed to have been born in Lympstone. He was active in raids on shipping and coastal settlements in the early 17th century before his capture in 1623 by Sir John Eliot.
- Sir Henry Pollexfen (1632–1691), Lord Chief Justice of the Common Pleas, lived in Lympstone following his purchase of Nutwell Court in 1685. He is buried in nearby Woodbury.
- Francis Augustus Eliott, 2nd Baron Heathfield (1750–1813), British Army officer and son of George Augustus Eliott, 1st Baron Heathfield, inherited the Lympstone and Nutwell estates through family connections. He undertook major rebuilding work at Nutwell Court between 1798 and 1803 while residing at nearby Gulliford Farm.
- Edward Shortland (1812–1893), New Zealand medical doctor, ethnographer and colonial official, was born at Courtlands House, Lympstone.
- Hugh Lyons-Montgomery (1812–1890), Irish Conservative politician and landowner, was born in Lympstone.
- Colonel Thomas Hussey (1826–1894), soldier and Member of Parliament, lived at Highcliffe and died in Lympstone. His sister, Lady Mary Chetwynd (d.1901), also lived in the village.
- Percy Pitt Luxmore (1845–1927), Rear-Admiral of the Royal Navy, lived in Lympstone during the 1870s.
- Arthur Bartholomew (1846–1940), first-class cricketer, was born in Lympstone.
- Edmund Doidge Anderson Morshead (1849–1912), English classical scholar and headmaster, was born in Lympstone.
- George Manson (1850–1876), Scottish watercolour painter, died in Lympstone and is buried at Gulliford Dissenters’ Burial Ground.
- William Brook Hallett (1891-1979), Justice of the Peace and agricultural administrator, was born at Gulliford Farm. He was an early proponent of the Young Farmers’ movement and later a National Farmers’ Union chairman and wartime rationing advisor.
- John Dauglish (1869–1934), Anglican clergyman, was Rector of Lympstone (1924–1931) before becoming Bishop of Nassau in 1932.
- Sir Thomas Hunton (1895–1972), Royal Marines officer and first Commandant General Royal Marines (1943–1946), lived in Lympstone from 1940 and died there in 1970.
- Alastair Blair (1905–1959), first-class cricketer, died in Lympstone.
- Theophilus Rhys-Jones (1910–1959), educator and headmaster of St Peter's Preparatory School, Harefield, Lympstone, was paternal grandfather of Sophie, Duchess of Edinburgh.
- Dave Davies (born 1947), musician and lead guitarist of The Kinks, lived in Lympstone during the 1990s.
- Steve Perryman (born 1951), former professional footballer for Tottenham Hotspur, currently resides in Lympstone.
- James Hewitt (born 1958), British Army officer, is known for his relationship with Diana, Princess of Wales and has frequently stayed at his family’s cottage in Lympstone.

== See also ==
- Lympstone Commando railway station
