= Exmouth Junction =

Railway junction in Devon, England

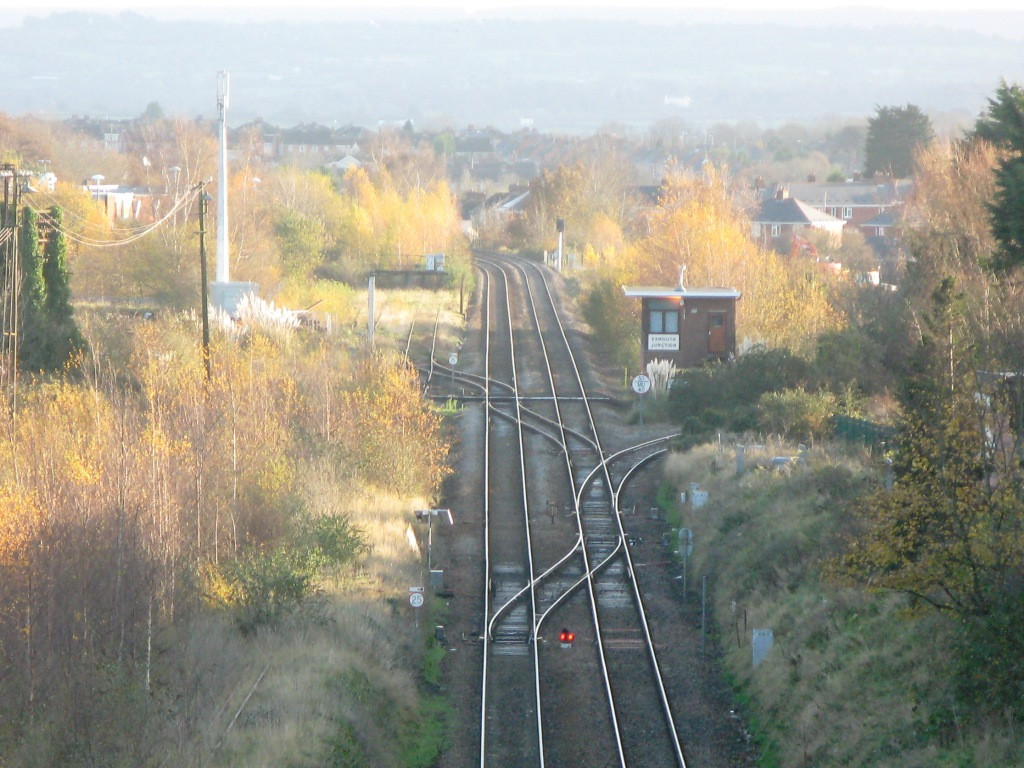
- Looking east towards London with the Exmouth branch diverging to the right behind the signal box. The engine shed and concrete works were on the left.

Overview
- Locale: Exeter, Devon, England; 50.7332°N 3.5077°W

Service
- Type: Flat junction
- Services: West of England Line; Avocet Line

History
- Opened: 1861
- Engine shed: 1887–1967
- Concrete works: 1913–1963

Technical
- Track gauge: 1,435 mm (4 ft 8 1/2 in) standard gauge

Exmouth Junction is the railway junction between the Exeter to Exmouth line and the Exeter to London Waterloo line in the Whipton district of Exeter in Devon, England. It is 1.1 miles (1.8 km) east of Exeter Central railway station.

From 1887 until 1967 it was the location of one of the largest engine sheds in the area served by the London and South Western Railway and its successors. The Southern Railway sited its concrete casting factory here in 1913 and it operated for 50 years.

== Background ==
The London and South Western Railway (LSWR) opened its main line from Yeovil Junction to Exeter Queen Street on 19 July 1860, and a branch line from Exeter to Exmouth on 1 May the following year. The junction of the two lines was 1.1 mi (1.8 km) from Queen Street, just east of the 263-yard (240 m) Blackboy Tunnel.

== Signal box ==
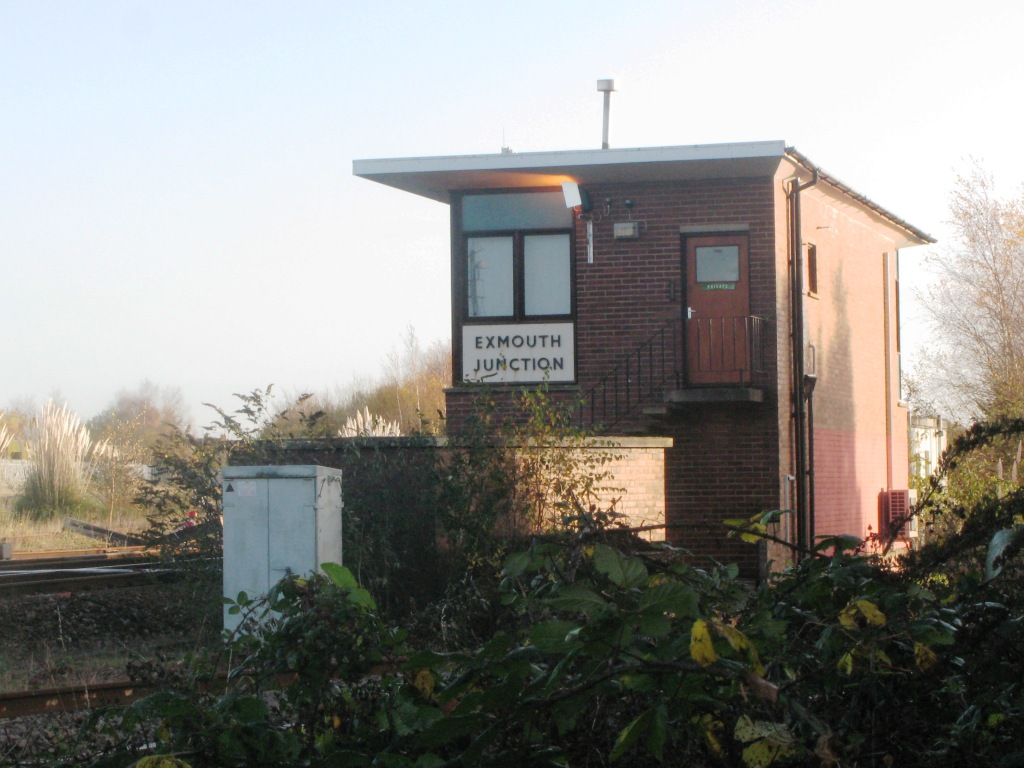
The signal box that was built in 1959

The first signal box was built between the main and branch lines in 1875 and from 1887 had to control the entrance to the engine shed which was in front of the box. The line from Yeovil to Exeter was already double track but the Exmouth line had only one until 31 May 1908. The lever frame had to be extended in 1927 to accommodate the extra levers for track alterations to serve the enlarged engine shed.

A new brick-built 64-lever signal box with flat roof was brought into use on 15 November 1959. The building is still in use, but the levers were replaced by a modern panel on 15 February 1988 when it took over control of the level crossing and signals at Pinhoe, where the two tracks merge into a single line towards Honiton. The panel also supervises all movements on the Exmouth branch, including the passing loop and CCTV level crossing at Topsham.

== Engine shed ==
An engine shed was initially provided next to the station at Queen Street but as the number of trains serviced grew too many for the cramped site, a new shed was opened on 3 November 1887 at Exmouth Junction in 1887 on land to the north of the main line. The main shed was built in corrugated iron and covered 11 tracks. A 55 feet (17 m) turntable was situated behind the shed to turn locomotives, and a range of other facilities were provided including a dormitory for engine crews and a wagon repair workshop.

It was rebuilt in the 1920s by the Southern Railway (which the LSWR had been amalgamated into in 1923). Work started in the summer of 1924. The first 7 tracks were brought into use in 1926 and the final work was completed in 1929. The main shed was of concrete construction 270 by 235 feet (82 m × 72 m) covering 13 tracks. A crane above one track could lift loads of 63 long tons (64,000 kg). A new 65 feet (20 m) turntable was provided, and a mechanical coaling tower with a capacity of 300 long tons built from concrete replaced the old wooden coaling platform. The turntable was replaced again in 1947, this time by a 70 feet (21 m) example. Carriage and wagon repair shops were added to the west of the engine shed in 1983.

More than 400 staff were based at the depot, including 240 locomotive crew, with more than 100 locomotives. Part of the Southern Region of British Railways from 1948, it was given the shed code 72A. In 1963 it was transferred to the Western Region and the code was changed to 83D. It was closed to steam on 1 June 1965, when there were just 23 locomotives allocated to it, and the staff transferred elsewhere in 1966. It was retained for stabling diesels until final closure on 6 March 1967.

== Concrete works ==
Concrete works were established near the engine shed in 1913 using an area 175 ft × 1,000 ft (53 m × 305 m) on the north side of the site. Stone came from the railway's Meldon Quarry (or later from the Western Region quarry near Newton Abbot) and sea sand from Fremington. Products included fences, lamps and signal posts, cable posts and troughing, track components, station nameboards and platforms. It closed in 1963 when the work was transferred to the Western Region facility at Taunton.

== Goods yards ==
Exmouth Junction was the main marshalling yard with 10 sidings for sorting goods traffic between SR stations in Devon and Cornwall, and points further east. in the 1950s it was seeing about 700 wagons each day. A coal concentration depot was opened on 4 December 1967 where the concrete works used to be and continued in use into the 1980s.

== Passenger stations ==
Although there has never been a railway station known as Exmouth Junction, four suburban stations were opened nearby in the early twentieth century. They were served by local trains between Exeter Queen Street and Honiton on the main line, and Exmouth. Only two, St James Park Halt and Polsloe Bridge, remain open.

=== Mount Pleasant Road Halt ===
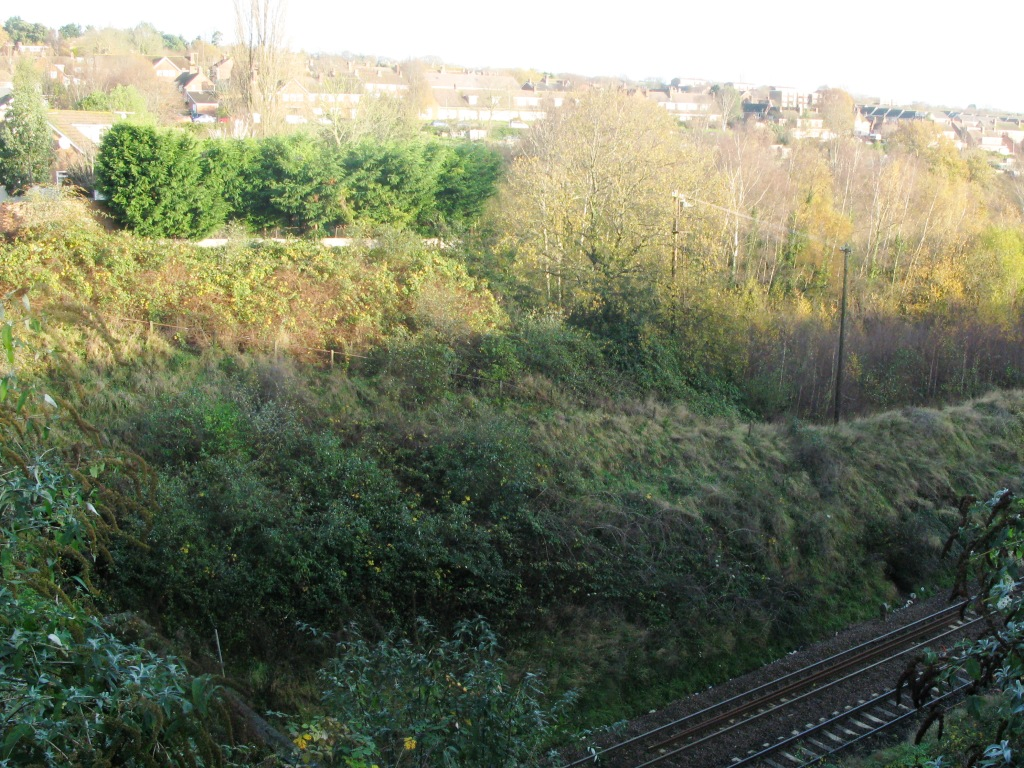
The site of Mount Pleasant Road Halt

Two wooden platforms were situated in the cutting between Exmouth Junction and Blackboy Tunnel (at 50.7329°N 3.5125°W) accessed by paths from Mount Pleasant Road which crossed above the tunnel entrance. The halt was opened on 26 January 1906 and closed on 2 January 1928.

=== Whipton Bridge Halt ===
Also opened on 26 January 1906, this station was placed where the line towards Honiton crossed over Summer Lane at 50.7357°N 3.4922°W, 0.65 miles (1.05 km) from Exmouth Junction. It was the first of the local stations to close, which happened on 1 January 1923.

=== Polsloe Bridge Halt ===
0.43 miles (0.7 km) along the Exmouth branch, this station was opened on 1 June 1908 where the line crosses over the Pinhoe Road at 50.7312°N 3.5016°W. The wooden platforms were situated on top of an embankment but were replaced by concrete ones cast at Exmouth Junction in 1927. Both are still in situ but only one is now used.

=== St. James Park Halt ===
Situated between Exmouth Jn and Exeter Central it opened in 1906 as Lions Holt Halt. It was originally built with wooden platforms but later rebuilt with concrete ones cast at Exmouth Jn.

== See also ==
- Southern Railway routes west of Salisbury
