= Exmouth railway station =

Railway station in Devon, England

Exmouth

General information
- Location: Exmouth, Devon; England
- Coordinates: 50.62179°N 3.41507°W
- Grid reference: SX999811
- Manager: Great Western Railway
- Platforms: 1

Other information
- Station code: EXM
- Classification: DfT category D

History
- Original company: London and South Western Railway
- Post-grouping: Southern Railway

Key dates
- 1861: Opened
- 1924: Rebuilt
- 1976: Rebuilt

Passengers
- 2020/21: ▼0.328 million
- 2021/22: ▲0.807 million
- 2022/23: ▲0.898 million
- 2023/24: ▲0.917 million
- 2024/25: ▲1.000 million
Location
Notes
- Passenger statistics from the Office of Rail and Road

Exmouth railway station serves the town of Exmouth in Devon, England and is 11.25 miles (18 km) south of Exeter St Davids, the terminus of the Avocet Line (which branches off from the West of England Main Line after Exeter Central). The station is managed by Great Western Railway, who operate all trains serving it.

== History ==
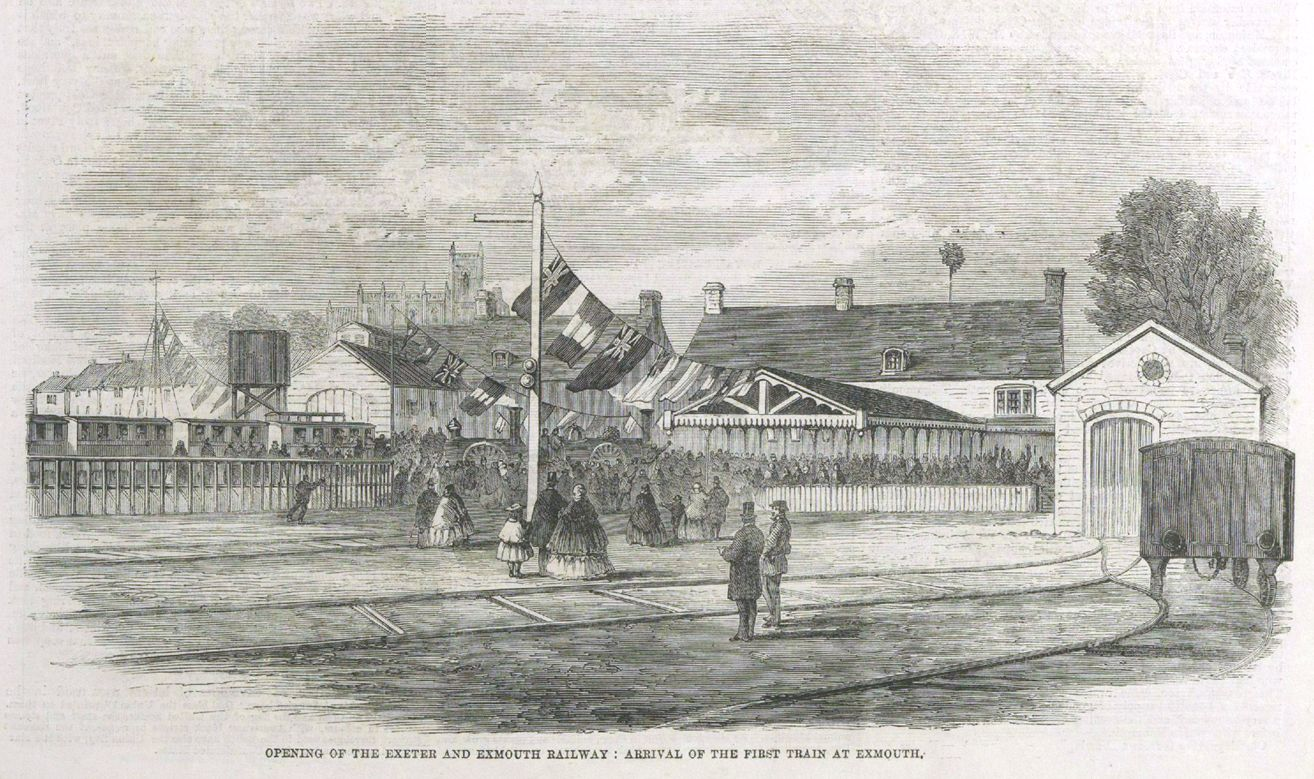
The opening of the station in 1861 in the Illustrated London News

The railway to Exmouth was opened on 1 May 1861. The first train started from Exeter Station comprising eleven carriages drawn by the engine Comet. The train with its complement of 150 passengers arrived in Exmouth at 8.16am.

A dock designed by Eugenius Birch were opened at Exmouth in 1866. A siding was laid from the goods yard in 1864 while the dock was being built, and it was used for goods traffic from the dock by 1868. Trains were propelled down to the docks and hauled back with the locomotive on the front, a man with a red flag waking ahead of the train. They were not allowed to run after dark.

A branch line with a junction immediately beyond the end of the platforms was opened on 1 June 1903. This ran around the outskirts of Exmouth on a long, curving viaduct, passing through Littleham and then on to Budleigh Salterton meeting the Sidmouth branch line at Tipton St Johns where it connected with an earlier line to Sidmouth Junction railway station. This route was used for through carriages from London Waterloo station sometimes called the Atlantic Coast Express and also a short while from Cleethorpes, which ran via the Somerset and Dorset Joint Railway and Templecombe. The line was closed to all traffic on 6 March 1967 following publication of the report The Reshaping of British Railways.

The original station consisted of a single platform with a track on either side. It was rebuilt with four platform faces, opening on 20 July 1924. An engine shed was provided from the earliest days on the east side of the station, opposite the platforms. It was closed on 8 November 1963 following the introduction of DMU services on the line.

General goods traffic was withdrawn in September 1965 although coal was still handled at the station and the dock line continued in use until 4 December 4 1967. The signal box was closed on 10 March 1968 after which only one train was allowed south of Topsham and only one platform of the four-platform station was required. The station building was demolished and replaced with the present building. A single face (the old platform 2) was opened on 2 May 1976. The eastern side of the station was used for a new road which opened on 10 December 1981; the town's bus station and a swimming and sports centre are also built on the old station site.

Following the privatisation of British Rail the station was operated by Wales & West from 1997 to 2001 and Wessex Trains from 14 October 2001 until 31 March 2006 when operation of the station transferred to Great Western Railway.

== Description ==
This station features a single platform, located on the right when arriving from Exeter. The station features a ticket office which is open on Mondays to Saturdays only, between 7:10 and 15:25. Ticket machines, station parking, and bike racks are also available. There are also public toilets just outside the station.

== Services ==
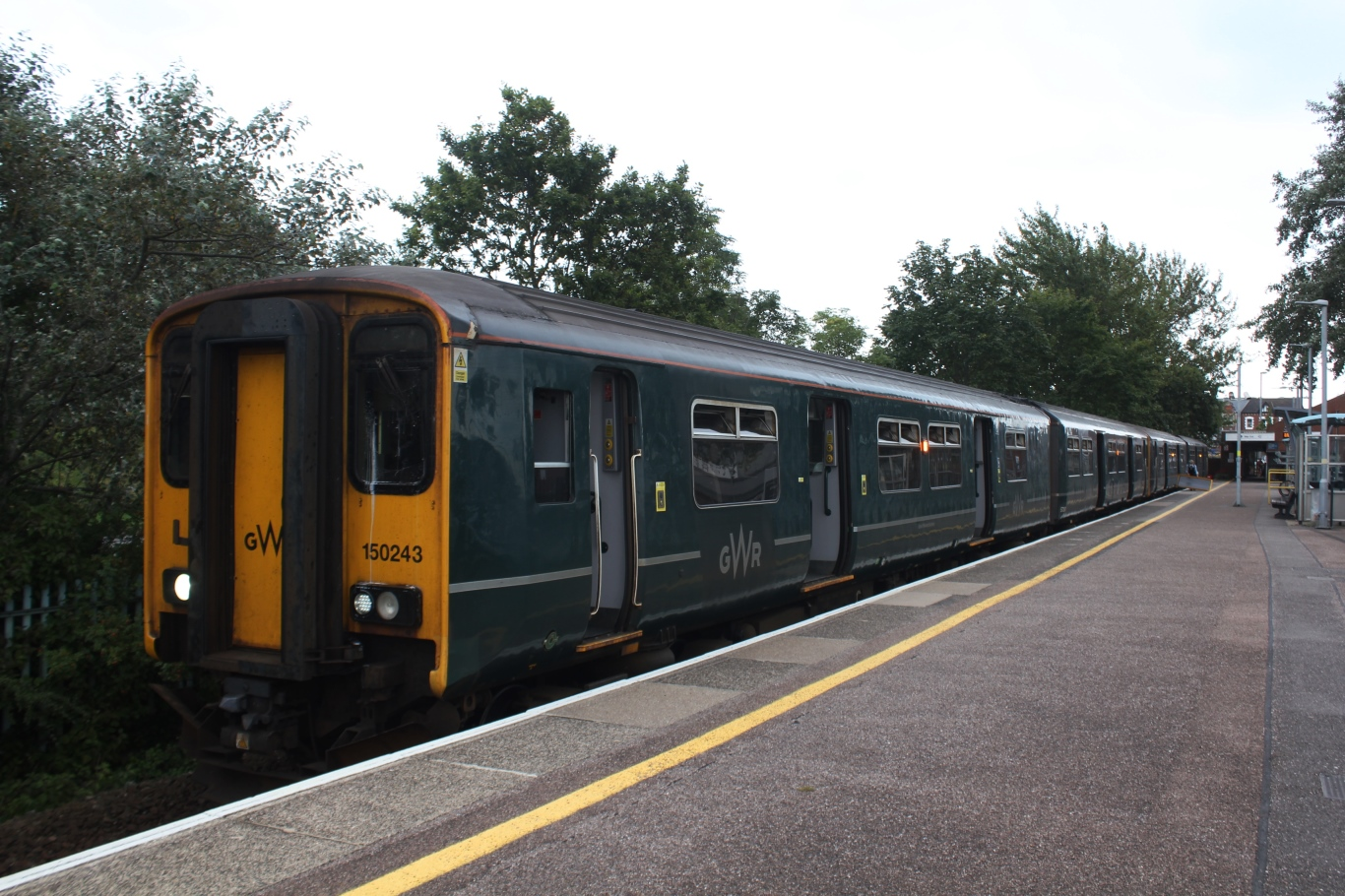
A Class 150 going to Paignton

Exmouth is served by Great Western Railway trains to and from Exeter St Davids and Paignton, the section between Exmouth and Exeter being promoted as the Avocet Line. There are generally two trains in each direction each hour throughout the week.

Preceding station	National Rail	Following station
Lympstone Village towards Exeter St Davids	Great Western Railway Avocet Line	Terminus
Disused railways
Littleham; Line and station closed	British Rail; Southern Region; Budleigh Salterton Railway	Terminus

This station offers access to the South West Coast Path
Distance to path	0.25 miles (0.40 km)
Next station anticlockwise	Weymouth 76 miles (122 km)
Next station clockwise	Starcross 0.5 miles (0.80 km) (plus ferry)
