= List of proposed railway stations in England =

Proposed railway stations in England

This article lists proposed railway stations in England:

== East Midlands ==
- Deepings
- Donington
- Pinchbeck
- Washingborough/Heighington.

== East of England ==
- Cambourne
- Cambridge East
- Granta Park
- Haverhill
- Linton
- Long Stratton
- Sawston
- Tempsford
- Wisbech East.

== North East ==
- Ferryhill
- Gilsland
- Team Valley.

== North West ==
=== Cumbria ===
- Keswick
- Moorside.

=== Greater Manchester ===
- Adswood
- Cheadle
- Golborne South
- High Lane
- Stanley Green.

=== Lancashire ===
- Cottam Parkway
- Ewood
- Fleetwood
- Lower Darwen
- Skelmersdale
- Thornton–Cleveleys.

=== Merseyside ===
- Beechwood
- Carr Mill
- Liverpool Baltic
- Town Meadow
- Vauxhall
- Woodchurch.

== South East ==
=== London ===
- Burgess Park
- Old Kent Road
- Old Oak Common (under construction)
- Pickett's Lock
- Surrey Canal.

=== Kent ===
- Hoo.

=== Surrey ===
- Guildford West
- Guildford East.

=== Sussex ===
- Barcombe Mills
- Isfield - currently on the Lavender Line.

== West of England ==
=== Bristol ===
- Bristol Airport
- Stonehouse Bristol Road.

==== MetroWest ====
- Ashton Gate
- Bristol Brabazon under construction
- Corsham
- Henbury
- Horfield
- Pill under construction
- Portishead under construction
- Saltford
- St Anne's Park

=== Somerset ===
- Bideford
- Wellington - reopening.

=== Devon ===
- Instow
- Laira.

==== Devon Metro ====
- Cullompton - reopening
- Edginswell
- Monkerton/Hill Barton
- Tavistock.

== West Midlands ==
- Balsall Heath
- Birmingham Curzon Street (under construction)
- Brinsford
- Castle Bromwich
- Coventry East\Binley
- Foleshill
- Rugby Parkway
- Shrewsbury Parkway
- Stockingford - reopening
- Tettenhall
- Weedon

== Yorkshire ==
=== North Yorkshire ===
- Haxby - reopening.

==== Harrogate Line ====
The following new stations proposed with the line's possible future electrification:

- Acomb
- Arthington Parkway - reopening
- Belmont
- Bilton
- Buttersyke Bar – park and ride
- Cookridge
- Flaxby Moor
- Horsforth Woodside
- Knaresborough East
- Leeds/Bradford Airport Parkway
- Manse Farm
- Nether Poppleton
- York Business Park.

=== South Yorkshire ===
- Finningley, for Doncaster Sheffield Airport.

=== West Yorkshire ===
- Earby.

==== West Yorkshire Metro ====
The following new stations proposed with the proposed tram line:

- Armley
- Bowling Park/West Bowling
- Calverley
- Cornholme
- Crigglestone
- Crofton
- Crosshills
- East Ardsley
- East End Park
- East Leeds Parkway
- Elland - reopening
- Elland Road / Beeston
- Greetland
- Haigh
- Hipperholme
- Holbeck - reopening
- Golcar
- Hemsworth
- Horbury Bridge
- Laisterdyke
- Leeds East
- Luddendenfoot
- Manningham - reopening
- Methley
- Norwood Green
- Osmondthorpe - reopening
- Ossett Parkway
- Salterhebble
- Seacroft Hospital
- Stourton
- Thornhill Lees
- Thorpe Park
- Wrenthorpe.

== See also ==
- List of proposed railway stations in Scotland
- List of proposed railway stations in Wales
