= Devon Metro =

Urban railway network in Exeter, England

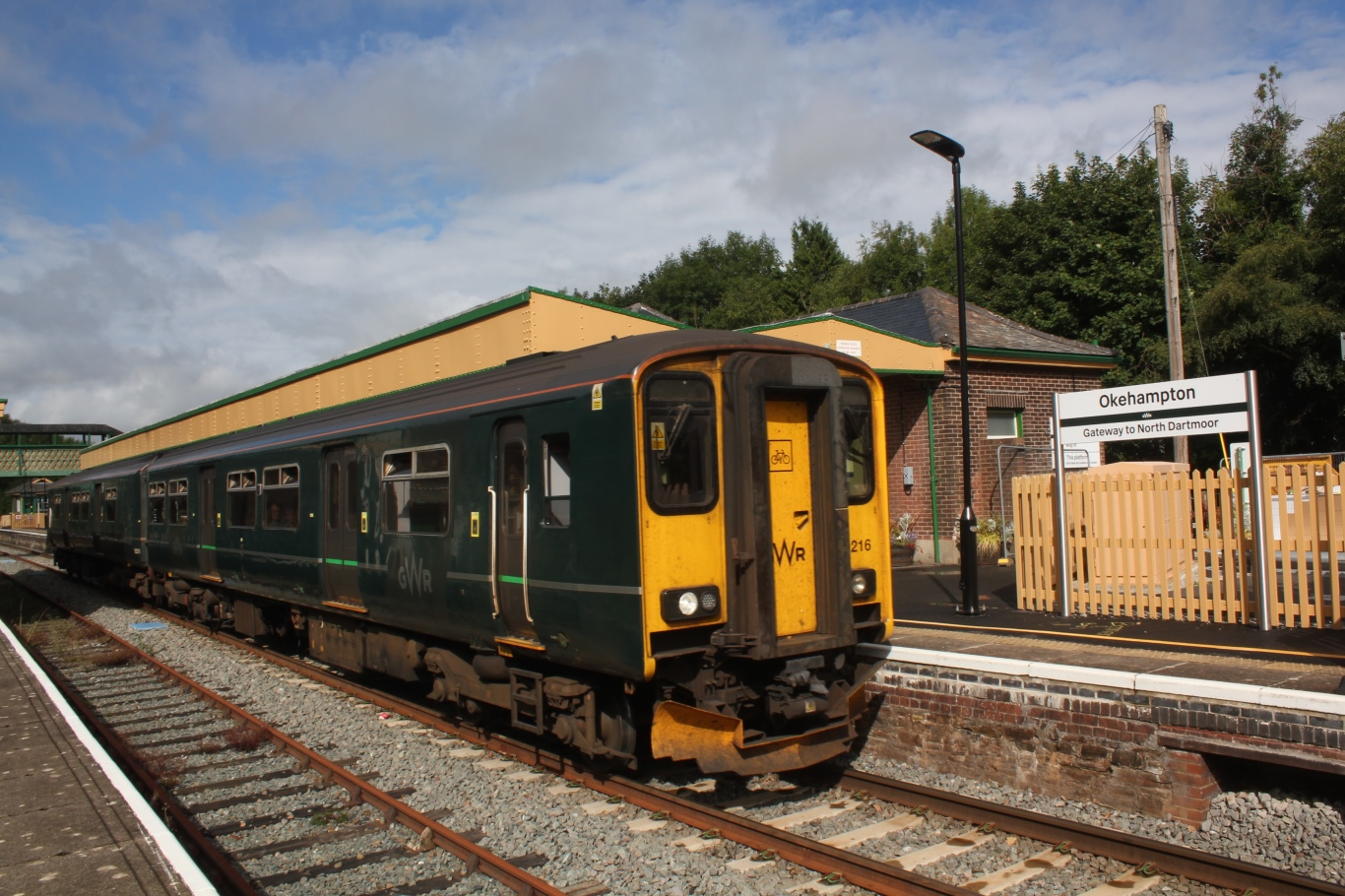
- Okehampton Station was reopened in 2021 as part of the Devon Metro project

Overview
- Area served: Greater Exeter (Exeter travel to work area)
- Locale: Devon, United Kingdom
- Transit type: Suburban rail, commuter rail
- Number of lines: 5
- Number of stations: 41
- Daily ridership: ▲ c. 21,000 (2026)

Operation
- Operators: Great Western Railway, South Western Railway
- Infrastructure manager: Network Rail
- Train length: 2–6 cars

Technical
- System length: 112.5 miles (181.1 km)
- Track gauge: 4 ft 8 1/2 in (1,435 mm) standard gauge
System map
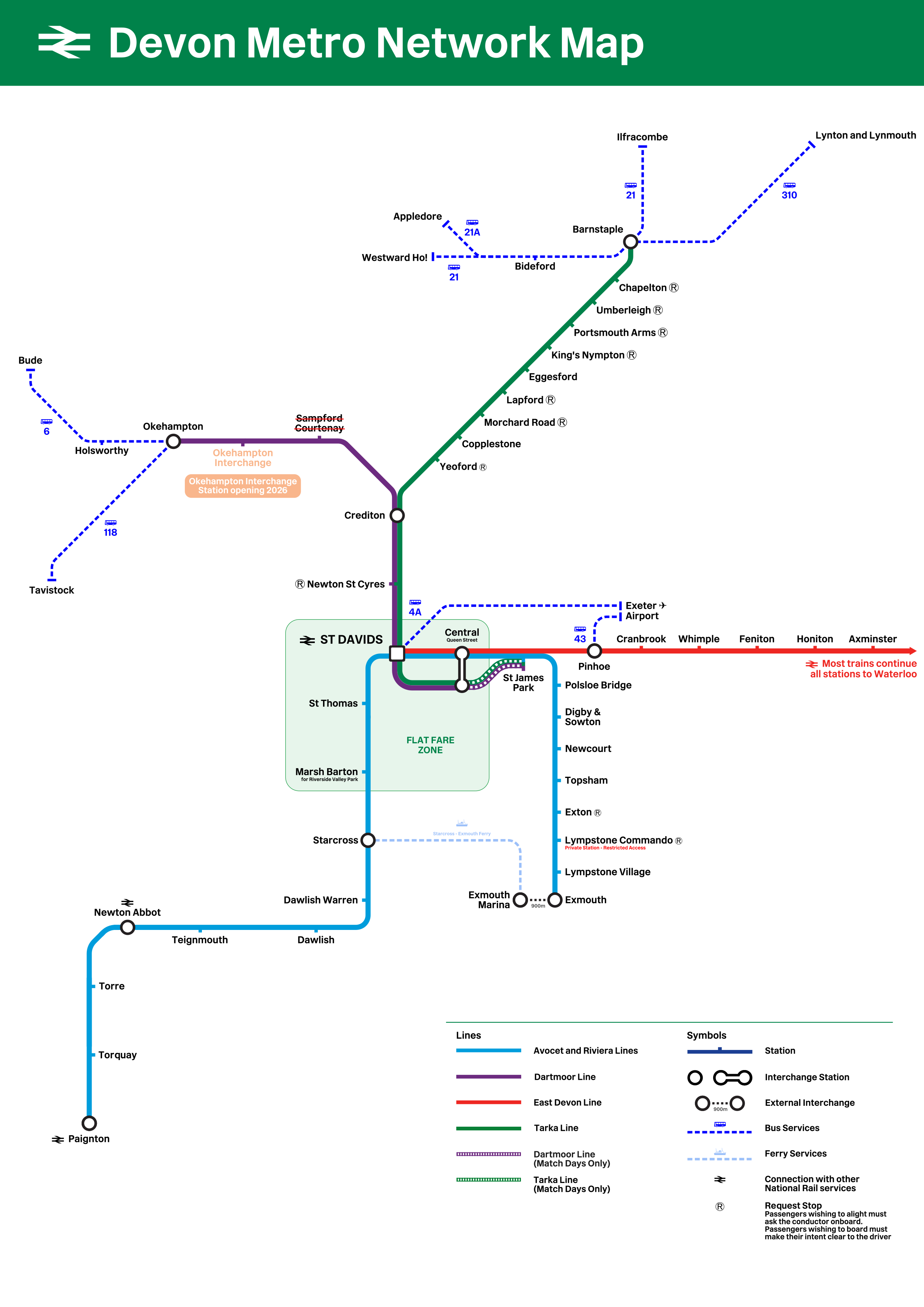

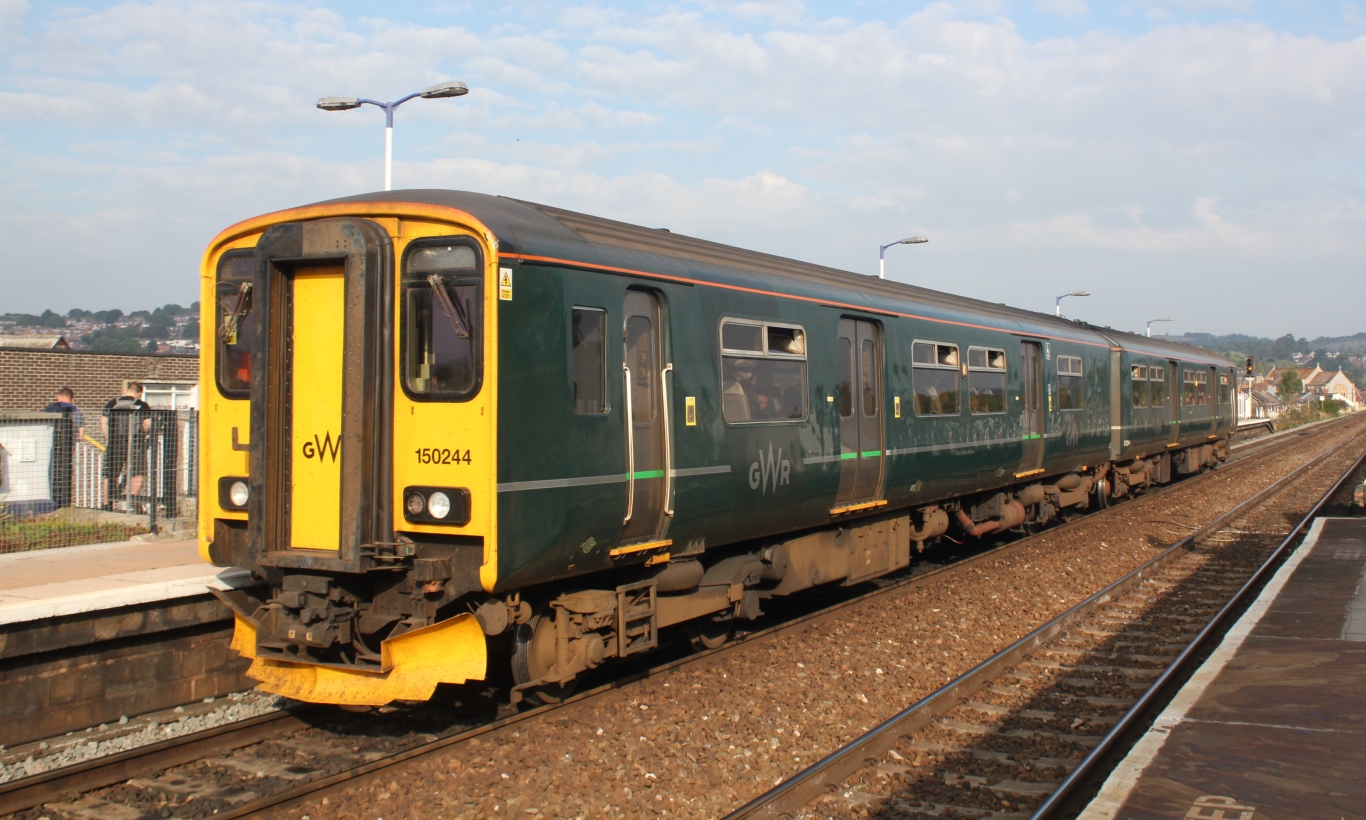
A Class 150 bound for Paignton on the Riviera Line calling at St Thomas station in 2018.

The Devon Metro is a Devon County Council strategy to increase passenger rail usage and reduce overcrowding on the regional rail network in and around the city of Exeter in Devon. It includes five lines with a total of 41 stations.

The strategy was initiated in 2011. It has resulted in increasing the frequency of trains on existing lines, new lines and stations opening, and improved integration between trains and other modes of transport. The intention is to see a portion of the regional rail network become a "turn-up-and-go" service without the need to refer to a timetable

== History ==
=== Background ===
Due to the historical development of railways by competing companies in Exeter, which acts as the gateway to the rest of the South West Peninsula, the city has enjoyed an unusually extensive railway network for its size, being the meeting point of various lines. Despite substantial sections of Exeter's railway infrastructure being selected for closure as a part of the Beeching Axe, such as St Thomas station and the Avocet and East Devon Lines, most of the network survived, but underwent significant economies to justify their retention, including the singling of previously double-tracked routes.

In the years since, Exeter has gone through substantial expansion and has become one of the fastest-growing cities in the country, with growth particularly in the eastern suburbs of the city. This has led to Exeter becoming one of the most congested cities in the UK. The need to reduce congestion on the roads led to the reopening of Pinhoe and Digby & Sowton stations in 1983 and 1995 respectively, and the construction of a new passing loop at Axminster in 2009 to increase the frequency on the East Devon Line. These enhancements in the east of the city were intended to attract more commuters to travel to and from the city centre by train instead of car. The local rail routes subsequently experienced rapid growth in passenger numbers, forcing them to operate near or at maximum track capacity with the limitations of the single-track lines left after Beeching. This impacted reliability, due to the lack of leeway available if a train was slightly delayed. This caused problems to cascade, often requiring trains to be cancelled to regulate the service. Compounded with the continuing high levels of congestion and population growth, this led Devon County Council to submit an expression of interest to the government for funding towards what it dubbed the "Devon Metro scheme" in 2010.

=== Initial proposals ===
Initial proposals of the Devon Metro scheme were laid out as part of the Future of Transport in Exeter consultation in March and April 2010. This set out short to medium term plans for new stations "related to areas of new development or existing employment sites in the city". New stations at Marsh Barton, Newcourt and Monkerton were explicitly mentioned. The proposal also included longer term goals such as a new station at Cullompton and increased train frequencies; however it also mentioned that increased train frequency would depend on the construction of new passing loops on single track lines.

In the final report written at the conclusion of the consultation, 84% of respondents indicated support for the rail enhancements under the Devon Metro scheme, with only 5% expressing opposition.

A further briefing was published in 2011 outlining the scheme in more detail, including an implementation plan for 2011-2026. In the short term they included:

- Increased frequency on the Riviera Line to 2tph to ease overcrowding
- Introduction of longer four-car trains by reallocating surplus rolling stock from other lines
- New Riviera line stations in Exeter at Marsh Barton and Newcourt, as well as at Edginswell in Torquay.
- New East Devon line station at Cranbrook.

The briefing also included longer term plans, including:

- Increased frequency on the Avocet line to 4tph, reliant on new passing loops being installed at Lympstone and Digby & Sowton.
- New Avocet line station at Monkerton to serve the Met Office headquarters at Exeter Business Park, reliant on an extra passing loop being installed.
- New station at Cullompton on the Bristol–Exeter line, reliant on a new local train service being introduced, as it is located on the main line.
- Increased frequency on the East Devon line to 2tph, reliant on a new passing loop being installed at either Cranbrook or Whimple.

Several improvements were also ruled out at this stage:

- A new station at Exminster just south of Exeter was deemed not possible as the high levels of traffic on the South Devon main line, which overlaps with the majority of the Riviera line, only made a single additional station practical without further infrastructure improvements. (Marsh Barton was chosen instead as the station to be prioritised, eventually opening in 2023.)
- Reactivating the Dartmoor line was not considered viable due to the high capital cost of the re-opening and the revenue cost of the operation. (Despite this the Dartmoor line was later reopened as a part of the Devon Metro in 2021, with funding from the Restoring Your Railway programme.)
- Realigning the section of railway from Dawlish to Teignmouth to prevent disruption from sea water and weather damage was said not to justify the large costs.

=== Completed enhancements ===
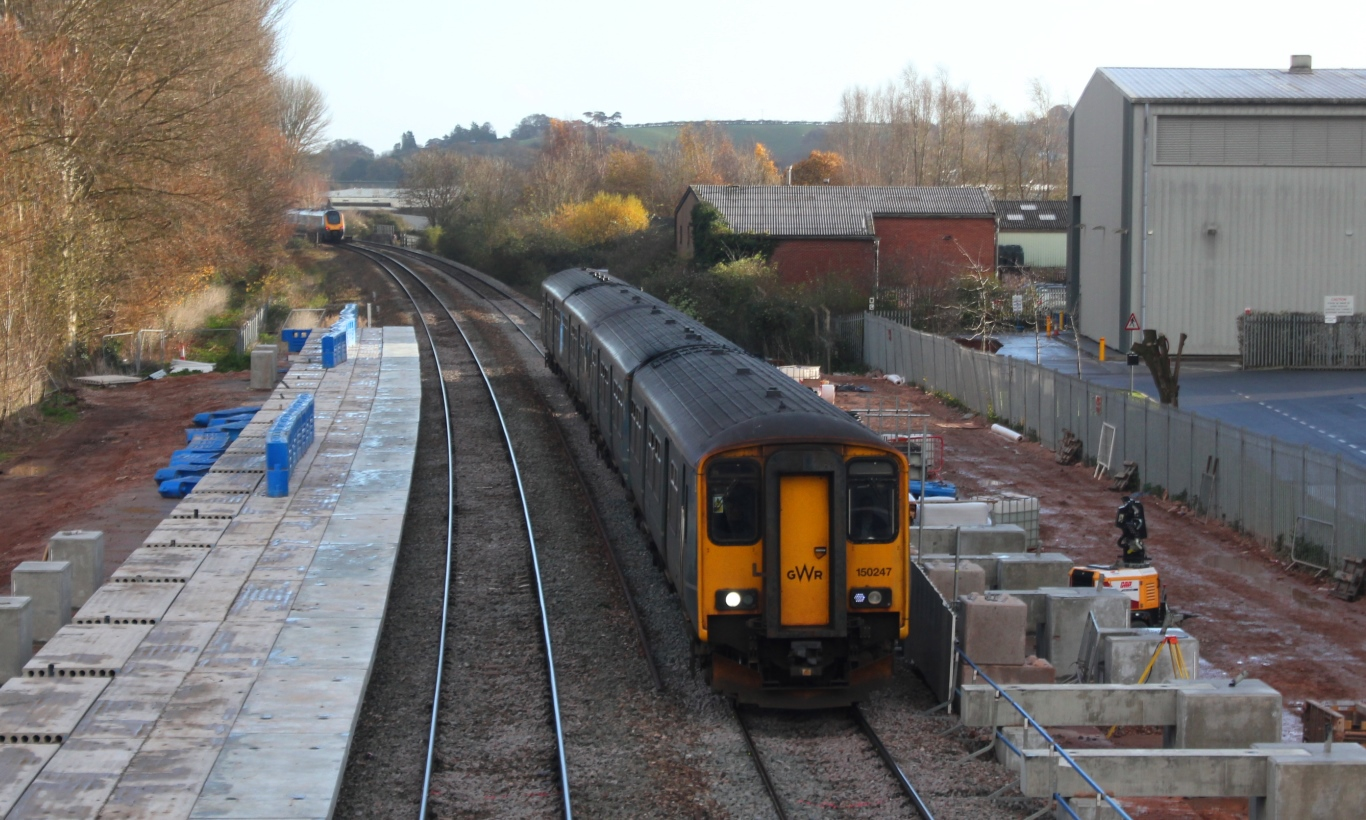
Construction of Marsh Barton station underway in 2021.

Some of the enhancements completed since Devon Metro started:

- The frequency on the Riviera Line was increased to two trains per hour in 2014.
- Cranbrook railway station opened in 2015.
- Newcourt railway station opened in 2015.
- Marsh Barton railway station opened in 2023.
- The Dartmoor Line reopened in 2021.
- Okehampton Interchange railway station opened in 2026.

== Future plans ==
Plans to create a Devon Metro also include a proposed new station at Edginswell on the Riviera Line. The council also wishes for the Dartmoor Line to be extended to serve the town of Tavistock, which would revive a connection provided until 1968 by the Exeter to Plymouth railway of the LSWR. A Tavistock rail link to Bere Alston was funded by the Restoring Your Railway fund until that was scrapped by the incoming Labour government in 2024.

Funding for stations in Wellington and Cullompton on the Bristol–Exeter line, which line was included in the Devon Metro plan but is yet to receive service enhancements, has been secured by new Spending Review settlement funding. Work on the new Wellington station commenced in early 2026.

== Passenger volume ==
2024/25 data shows that journeys to/from Exeter Central constitute the largest passenger flow for Newton Abbot (72,706 journeys), Exmouth (182,175 journeys), and Paignton (52,399 journeys).

== Routes ==
The network has five operational lines with a total of 41 stations across Exeter, East Devon, Mid Devon and Teignbridge. All routes serve the two principal stations in Exeter, Exeter Central and Exeter St Davids.

- The Avocet Line serves Exmouth; most services continue from Exeter along the Riviera Line.
- The Dartmoor Line serves Crediton and Okehampton.
- The East Devon Line is the part of the Exeter–London Waterloo line between Exeter and Axminster.
- The Riviera Line serves Newton Abbot and Paignton; most services continue from Exeter along the Avocet Line.
- The Tarka Line serves Crediton and Barnstaple.
