= Moorside =

Moorside may refer to any of these places in England:

- Moorside, Cheshire
- Moorside, County Durham
- Moorside, Cumbria
  - Moorside nuclear power station
  - Moorside railway station (Cumbria)
- Moorside, Dorset
- Moorside, Kirklees, West Yorkshire
- Moorside, Leeds, West Yorkshire
- Moorside, Oldham, Greater Manchester
- Moorside, Swinton, Greater Manchester
  - Moorside railway station
- Moorside, North Tyneside, Tyne and Wear
- Moorside, Sunderland, Tyne and Wear

== See also ==
- Moorside High School (disambiguation)
- The Moorside, a 2017 British television drama
- Hannah Moorside, a character in the British soap-opera Coronation Street
