= Torbay =

Borough in Devon, England

Torbay Borough of Torbay
- Borough and unitary authority area
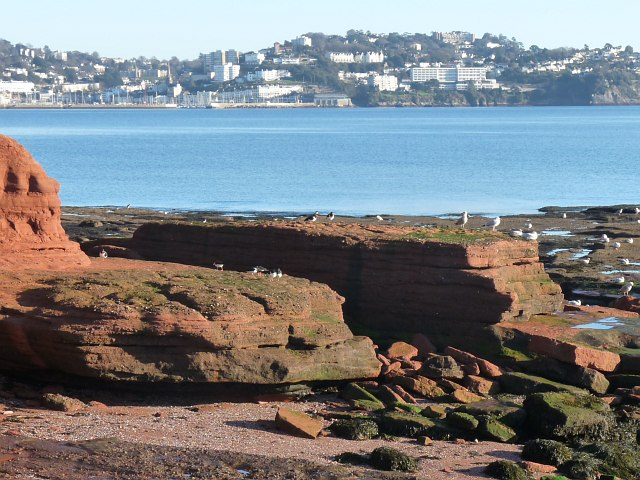
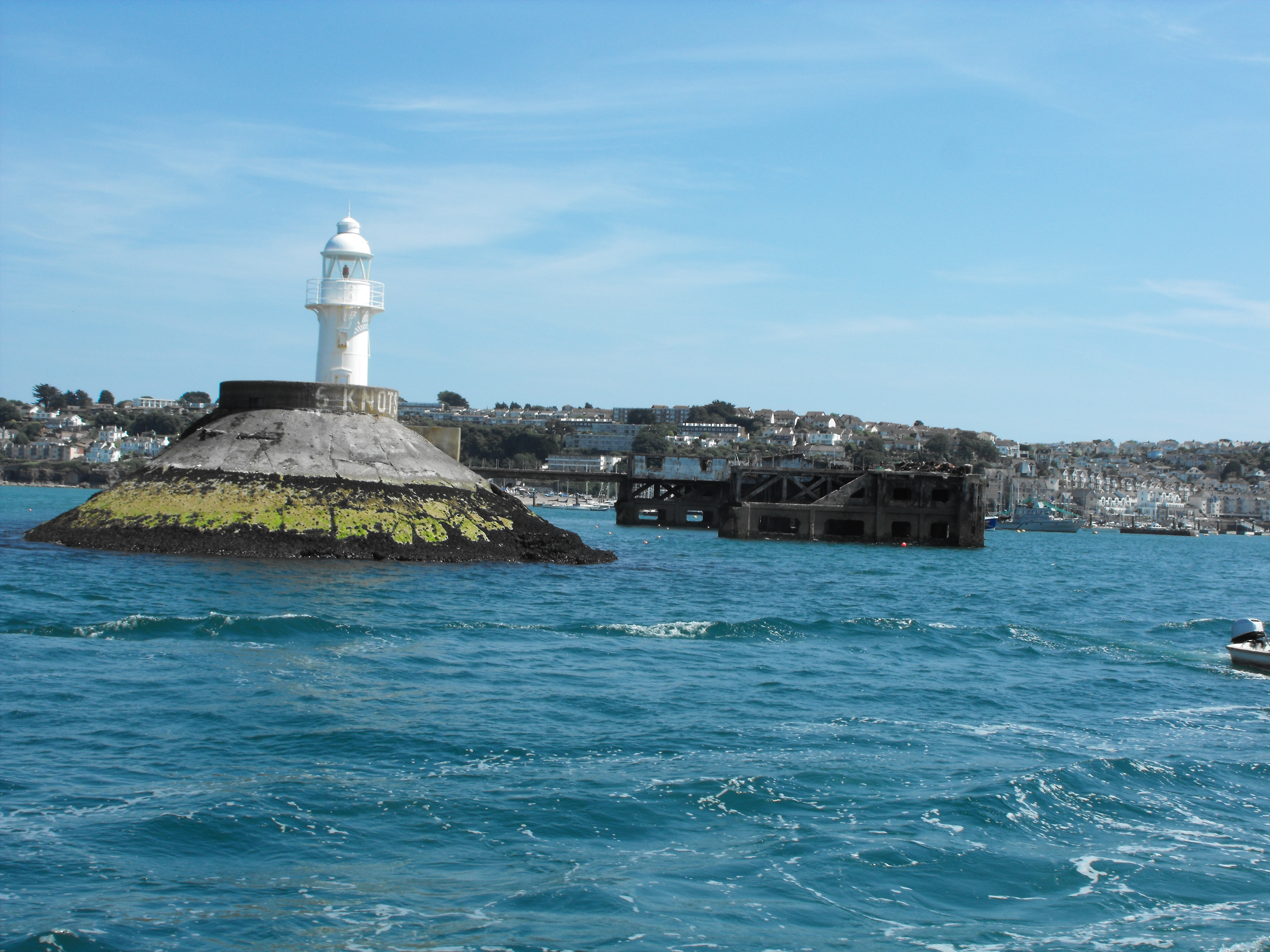
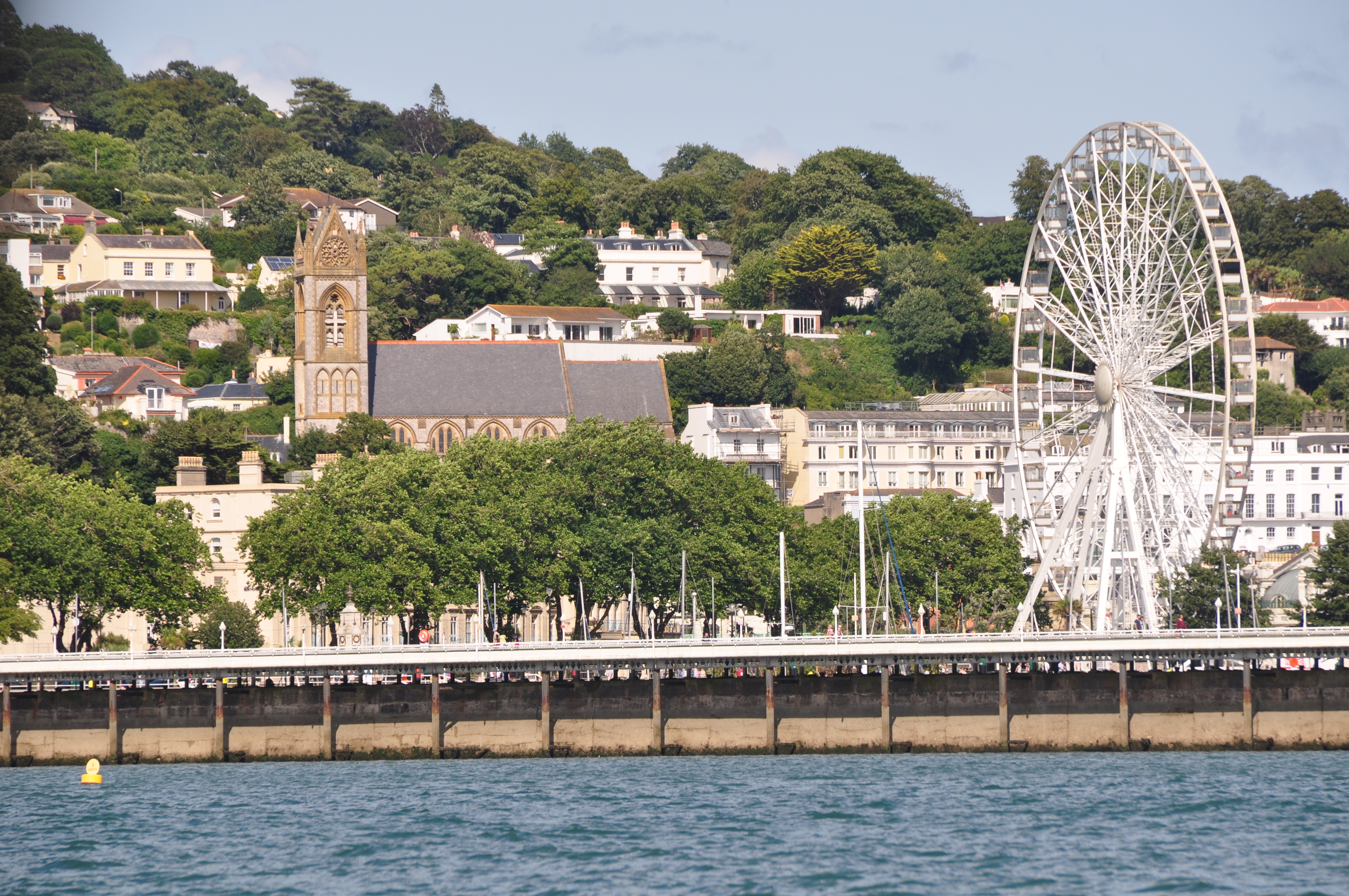
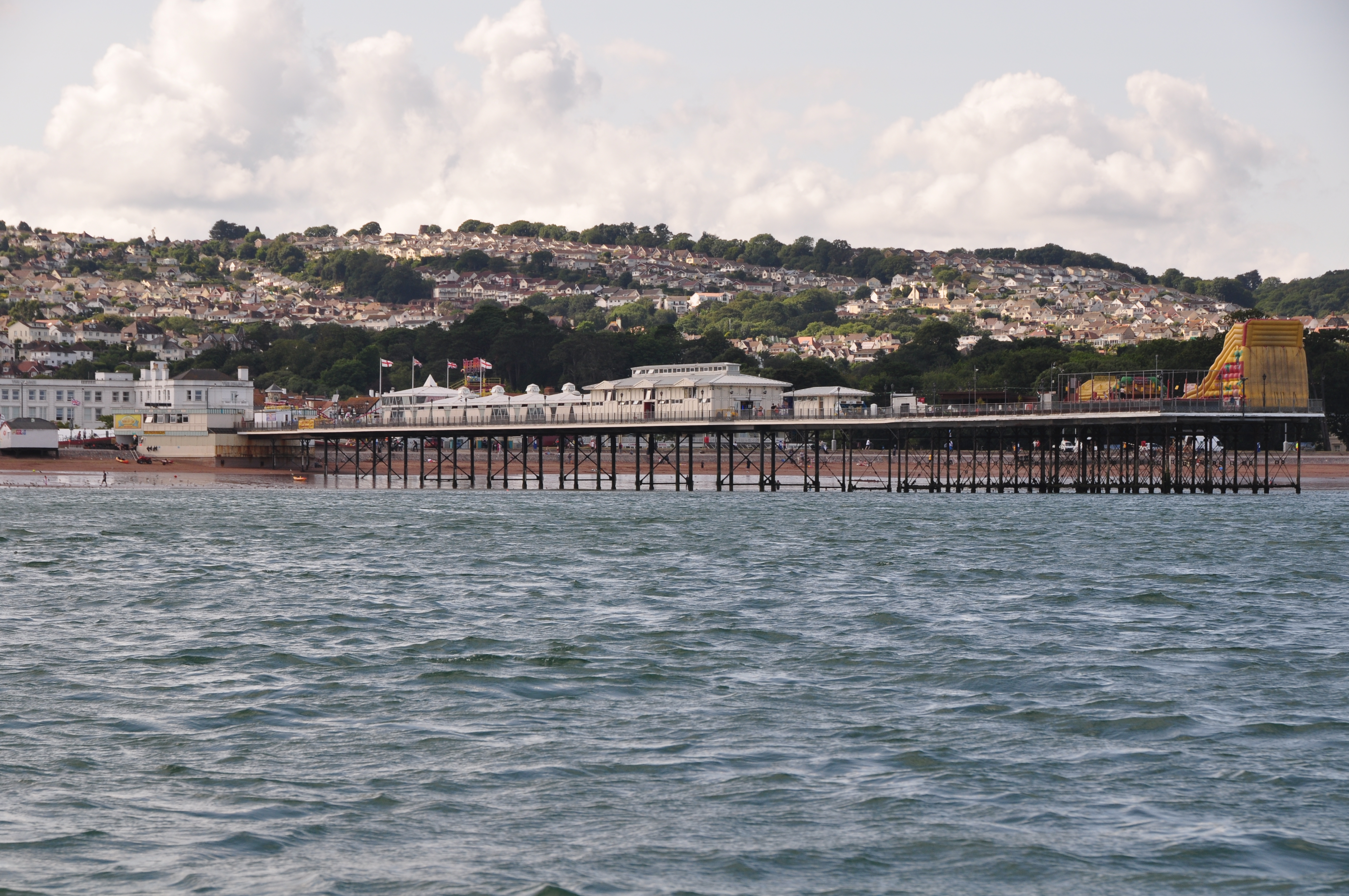
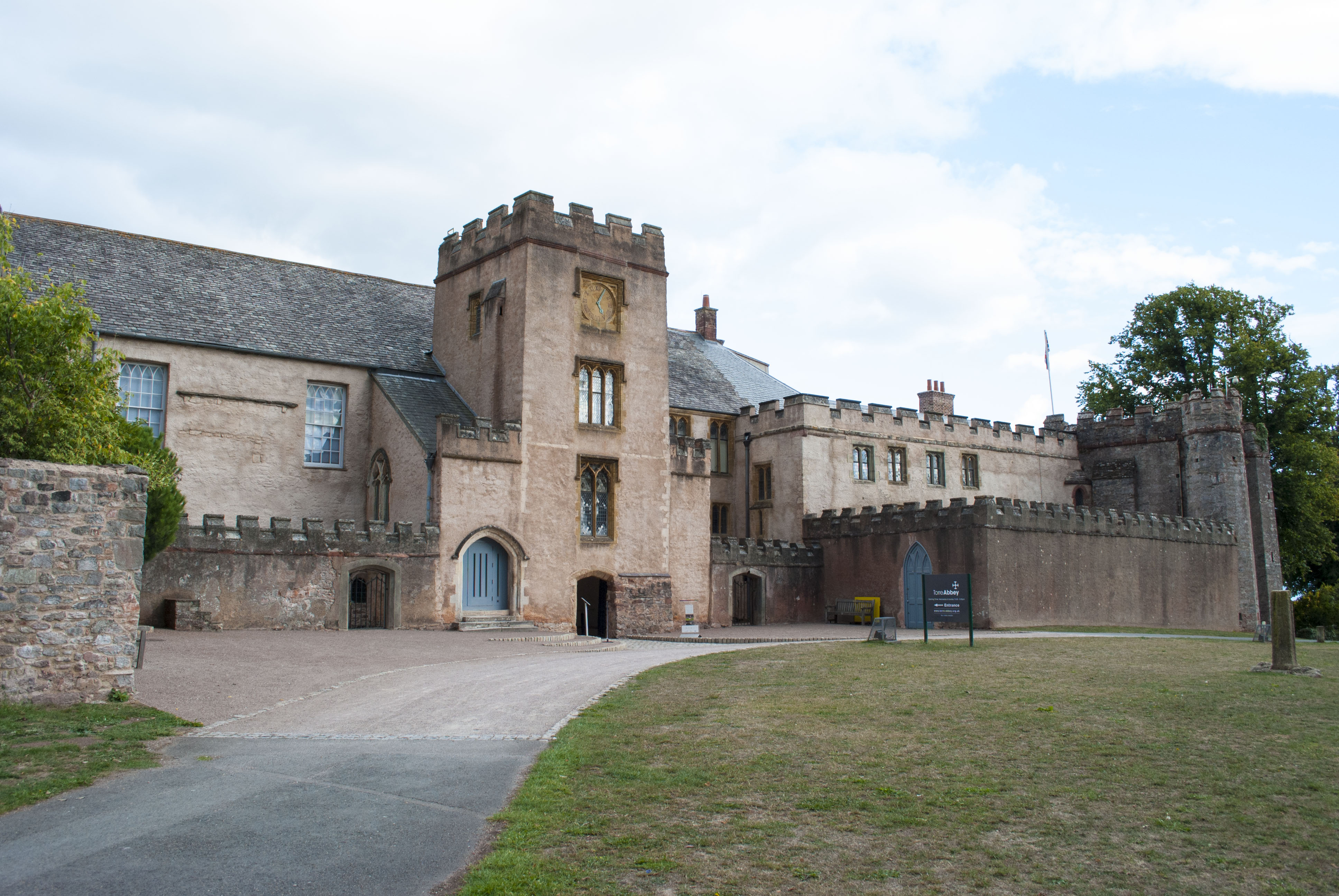
- From left to right; Top: View across Torbay; Middle: Brixham and Torquay coastal views; Bottom: Paignton Pier and Torre Abbey
- Nickname: The English Riviera
- Motto: Salus et felicitas "Health and Happiness"
- Torbay shown within Devon and England
- Coordinates: 50°27′8″N 3°33′25″W
- Sovereign state: United Kingdom
- Constituent country: England
- Region: South West England
- Ceremonial county: Devon
- Borough: 1968
- Unitary Authority: 1998
- areas of the borough (2021 census BUASD): List: Babbacombe; Brixham (Town and Parish); Chelston; Churston Ferrers; Cockington (Village); Collaton St Mary (Parish); Combe Pafford (Village); Ellacombe; Galmpton (Village); Goodrington; Meadfoot; Paignton (Town); Preston; Shiphay; St Marychurch; Tormohun (Parish); Torquay (Town)

Government
  - Type: Unitary authority
  - Body: Torbay Council
  - HQ: Torquay
  - MPs: Steve Darling (Lib Dems); Caroline Voaden (Lib Dems)

Area
  - Total: 24.27 sq mi (62.87 km^{2})
- Lowest elevation: 0 ft (0 m)

Population (2021)
  - Total: 122,466 (Unparished area) 139,324 (Unitary authority)

Ethnicity (2021)
  - Ethnic groups: Unparished area (Excluding Brixham) List: 95.9% White; 1.8% Asian; 1.5% Mixed; 0.3% Black; 0.3% other

Religion (2021)
  - Religion: List: 51.4% Christianity; 46.5% no religion; 0.7% other; 0.6% Islam; 0.4% Buddhism; 0.2% Hinduism; 0.1% Sikhism
- Time zone: UTC0 (GMT)
  - Summer (DST): UTC+1 (BST)
- Postcode district: TQ1–5
- ISO 3166 code: GB-TOB
- Website: torbay.gov.uk

Torbay /tɔːrˈbeɪ/ is a borough and unitary authority area in Devon, south west England. It is governed by Torbay Council, based in the town of Torquay, and also includes the towns of Paignton and Brixham. In 2021 it had a population of 139,324. The borough consists of 24.27 sq mi (62.9 km^{2}) of land around the east-facing Tor Bay, part of Lyme Bay on the English Channel. A popular tourist destination, Torbay's sandy beaches, mild climate and recreational and leisure attractions have given rise to its nickname of the English Riviera. The neighbouring districts are South Hams and Teignbridge.

== History ==
Human bones and tools found in Kents Cavern in Torquay show that people have inhabited the Torbay area since Paleolithic times. A maxilla fragment known as Kents Cavern 4 may be the oldest example of a modern human in Europe, dating back to 40,000–37,000 years ago. Roman soldiers are known to have visited Torquay when Britannia formed a part of the Roman Empire; they left offerings at a curious rock formation in Kent's Cavern, known as "The Face". A Roman burial was discovered in 1993 in Paignton.

Both Brixham and Paignton appear in the Domesday Book of 1086, and Paignton was given a market charter in 1294 granting it a weekly market and annual fair. The first major building in Torquay was Torre Abbey, a Premonstratensian monastery founded in 1196 and associated with the manor of Torre.

William, Prince of Orange (soon to be King William III), landed in Brixham on 5 November 1688, during the Glorious Revolution, and issued his famous declaration, "The Liberties of England and The Protestant Religion I Will Maintain".

Torquay's economy, like Brixham's, initially depended on fishing and agriculture, but in the early 19th century the area began to develop into a fashionable seaside resort, initially frequented by members of the Royal Navy during the Napoleonic Wars when naval ships anchored in Tor Bay; and later, as the town's fame spread, by Victorian society.

The historic part of Paignton lies inland: salt marsh formerly occupied the low-lying coastal fringe. Kirkham House is a late-medieval stone house and the Coverdale Tower adjacent to Paignton Parish Church is named after Miles Coverdale, who published an English translation of the Bible in 1536 and became Bishop of Exeter in 1551. Paignton remained a small fishing village until the early 19th century; a new harbour was built here in 1837.

A new phase in the urban expansion of the area began when Torre railway station opened in December 1848. The railway extended to Torquay Seafront station in 1858, to Paignton in 1859 and to Brixham in 1861. As a result of its expansion, Torquay was granted borough status in 1872, and 1902 saw its first marketing campaign to summer tourists.

Torbay Golf and Country Club (now defunct) opened in 1933. The club and course closed in the mid-1950s.

Tor Bay hosted the sailing events for the 1948 Summer Olympics in London.

In the 1970s Torbay had problems with substance abuse and people living in poor conditions in houses of multiple occupation.

== Governance ==
=== Council ===
Torbay Council is the local authority for the borough. Since 1998 it has been a unitary authority, performing the functions of both a county council and district council combined. The borough contains one civil parish, Brixham, which forms a second tier of local government in that part of the borough; the rest of the borough is an unparished area.

Torbay as an administrative area was created in 1968, when the municipal borough of Torquay, the urban districts of Brixham and Paignton, and the parish of Churston Ferrers were all abolished. Torbay was created as a county borough covering the area of the abolished authorities, with some adjustments of the boundaries to neighbouring areas; the more rural southern parts from Brixham and Churston Ferrers were transferred to the parish of Kingswear, and there were more minor adjustments to the boundaries with the neighbouring parishes of Coffinswell, Kerswells and Marldon. As a county borough, Torbay was administratively independent from Devon County Council. Six years later, in 1974, local government was reformed again, with Torbay becoming a non-metropolitan district and Devon County Council providing county-level services to the area again. Torbay regained its independence from the county council in 1998 when it was made a unitary authority. Torbay remains part of the ceremonial county of Devon for the purposes of lieutenancy.

=== Westminster ===
The area is represented nationally at the House of Commons by two MPs. Torquay (along with part of Paignton) is in the Torbay parliamentary constituency which was created in 1974 and was won by Steve Darling for the Liberal Democrats in 2024 having been held by Adrian Sanders of the Liberal Democrats from 1997 to 2015 and Kevin Foster for the Conservatives from 2015 to 2024. Brixham and part of Paignton fall within the South Devon constituency, which is also represented by a Liberal Democrat, Caroline Voaden.

=== Planned expansion ===
In July 2026, as part of the nationwide Local Government Reorganisation programme, it was announced that the Torbay unitary authority area would be significantly expanded to incorporate 21 neighbouring parishes from South Hams and Teignbridge, specifically Abbotskerswell, Berry Pomeroy, Bishopsteignton, Broadhempston, Coffinswell, Denbury and Torbryan, Haccombe with Combe, Ideford, Ipplepen, Kingskerswell, Kingsteignton, Kingswear, Littlehempston, Marldon, Newton Abbot, Ogwell, Shaldon, Stoke Gabriel, Stokeinteignhead, Teigngrace and Teignmouth. The changes are planned to come into full effect as of 2028.

== Geography ==
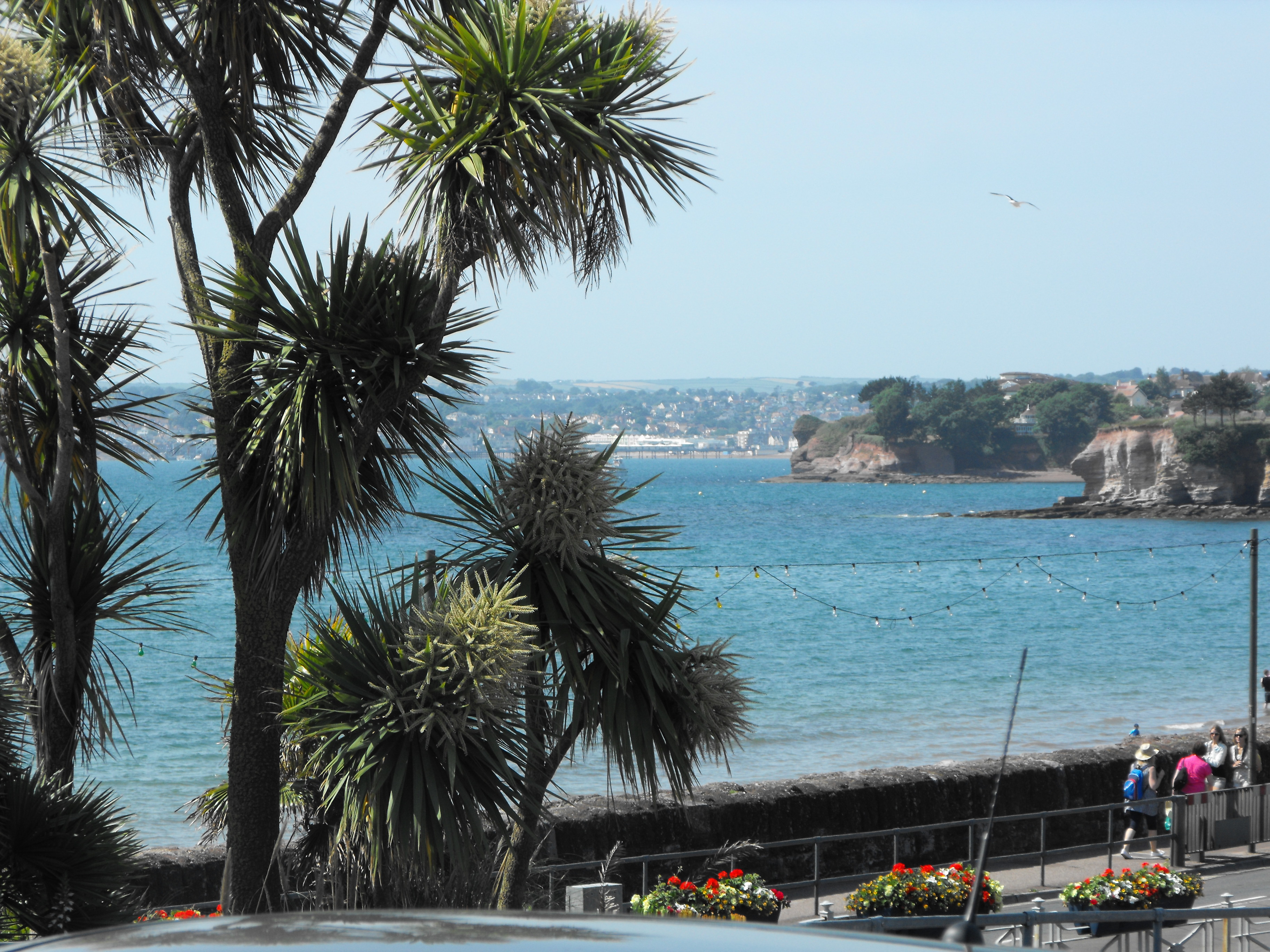
Looking towards Paignton from Torquay. Torbay palms in the foreground.

There are three main towns around the marine inlet of Tor Bay: Torquay in the north, Paignton in the centre, and Brixham in the south. These have become connected over the years, swallowing up villages and towns such as St Marychurch, Cockington, Churston Ferrers and Galmpton, though the last of these maintains a rural feel thanks to tight conservation measures. The borough of Torbay is bordered by the South Hams to the south and west, and by Teignbridge to the north. Nearby towns include Totnes and Dartmouth in the South Hams, and Newton Abbot and Teignmouth in Teignbridge.

The southern limit of Tor Bay is Berry Head, and the northern limit is Hope's Nose, although Torquay itself stretches further north into Babbacombe Bay, where the beaches at Oddicombe, Babbacombe and Maidencombe can be found; these are noted for their interesting Breccia cliffs. Torbay's many geological features have led to the establishment of the English Riviera Geopark; as of July 2008, this is the sole urban geopark of the 53 geoparks worldwide.

Because of the mild climate, Torbay palm trees are a common sight along the coast. However, these are in fact not palms but Cordyline australis, originating from New Zealand where it is known as "cabbage tree". These trees also flourish elsewhere in the UK. It is suggested that the popularity of cabbage trees in Torbay is attributable to their first being introduced to the UK in that region.

== Settlements ==
Torbay includes:

- Torquay including suburbs
- Paignton including suburbs
- Brixham including suburbs
- Broadsands
- Churston Ferrers
- Galmpton
- Goodrington

== Demography ==
The 2011 census confirmed Torbay's reputation as a retirement area, with a higher proportion of all age groups over the age of 50 than nationally. However compared to 2001, age groups 75-79 and 80-85 both showed a decline of around 4%, compared to increases of 1.5% and 14% for the whole country.

=== Numbers of people by marital status and religion, from the 2011 census ===
Marital status	Numbers
Single (never married)	31,809
Married or remarried	50,891
Separated or divorced	16,207
Widowed	10,030

Religion	Numbers
Christian	82,924
Buddhist	389
Hindu	128
Jewish	109
Muslim	521
Sikh	41
Other	702
No religion	36,035
Religion not stated	10,110

== Economy ==
Torbay's main activities are:

- public service; serving its large retired community such as in hospitality, construction and repairs
- tourism
- the transport sector including boats
- distribution
- retail
- fishing
- the digital, media and arts sector.

It has a few established schools and accredited teachers/hosts for the short-term study of English as a foreign language.

The fishing port of Brixham is home to one of England and Wales' most successful fishing fleets, and often lands more value than any UK port outside Scotland. It is also a base for His Majesty's Coastguard and the Torbay Lifeboat Station.

=== Twin towns ===
Torbay has been twinned with Hameln (which may be more familiar to British people as Hamelin) in Lower Saxony, Germany since 1973; and with Hellevoetsluis in the Netherlands since 1989.

== Deprivation and urban renewal ==
The Melville Street, Warren Road, Rock Road and Coburg Place area of Torbay, also known as Melville Hill, has experienced deprivation and violence since the 1970s. This is an historic area with 44 Grade II listed buildings.

In 2013, a Healthwatch report for the council found that the area had high levels of houses in multiple occupation, "a fairly transient community" and heavy drug use. The report stated that Melville Hill had "a historic reputation as a dumping ground for transient, out of work single people with chaotic lifestyles", but that most residents felt it was a friendly area. In 2014, the council said that the area had "significant challenge ... from car parking, poor quality public realm, bin storage, rat running, ASB, HMOs, lack of community space/play area, links to the town centre". In 2015, the local health authority noted that residents had a lower life expectancy than in other areas of Torbay, that the proportion of people in the area who had mental ill health or learning disabilities were high, that the suicide rate was higher than elsewhere in the South West, and that many residents were either unemployed or earnt low wages.

The local authority first set up a "Making Melville Marvellous" project to support urban renewal in 2013, but this did not lead to results. In 2020 the local authority identified £100,000 of funding from adult social care to start the project again. The aims include supporting people who misuse substances, improving the quality of housing and developing community.

== Transport ==
=== Roads ===
Torbay is beyond the motorway network and is primarily served by:

- A38 and A380 roads from Exeter to Tweenaways Cross, Paignton; this is dualled each way as far as Churscombe Cross, except for a single carriageway flyover at Penn Inn roundabout
- A379 follows a coastal route from Teignmouth, passes through Torquay and Paignton, then goes on to Dartmouth
- A385 road goes inland to Totnes
- A3022 road serves all three towns and varies between dual and single carriageway.

=== Buses ===
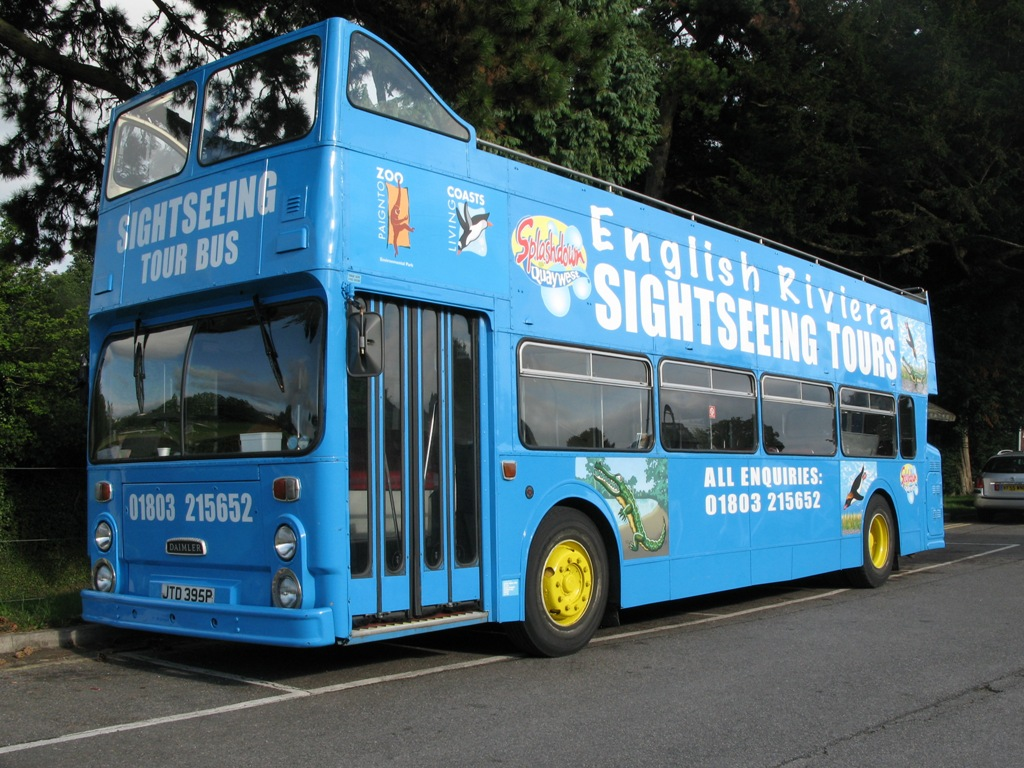
An open top bus advertising the English Riviera

Bus services are largely operated by Stagecoach South West, with some routes run by Torbay Minibuses and County Bus.

=== Railway ===
Torbay has three stations on the National Rail network, with services operated by Great Western Railway:

- Torquay railway station is close to Torre Abbey Sands
- Torre railway station is inland on the road from Torquay to Newton Abbot
- Paignton railway station serves that town and links with the heritage Dartmouth Steam Railway to Kingswear, connecting via the Dart ferry to Dartmouth. CrossCountry also provides a limited service here.

A new station at Edginswell was planned to open in December 2018 as part of the proposed Devon Metro but lack of funding prevented construction. Approval of planning permission expired November 2019, but a new application for funding was made in June 2020 for a new design incorporating lifts instead of ramps. If government funding is approved, a new planning application would be made. The station was awarded £7.8m from the New Stations Fund in November 2020.

== Notable people ==
Famous former residents of Torbay include:

- Sue Barker, tennis player
- Isambard Kingdom Brunel, industrialist and architect of the nearby Atmospheric railway,
- Lily Cole, model
- Peter Cook, comedian
- Agatha Christie, novelist who set many of her novels in a thinly disguised version of the area
- Jim Davidson, comedian
- Edmund Gosse, poet
- Charles Kingsley, professor
- Rudyard Kipling, novelist
- Prog-rock band Wishbone Ash

== In fiction ==
Torquay is perhaps best known in fiction as the location of Fawlty Towers.
