= Moorside High School =

Moorside High School may refer to:

- Moorside High School, Swinton, a secondary school in Swinton, Greater Manchester, England
- Moorside High School, Werrington, a secondary school in Werrington, Staffordshire, England

== See also ==
- Moorside (disambiguation)
