= New Stations Fund =

UK programme to open new railway stations

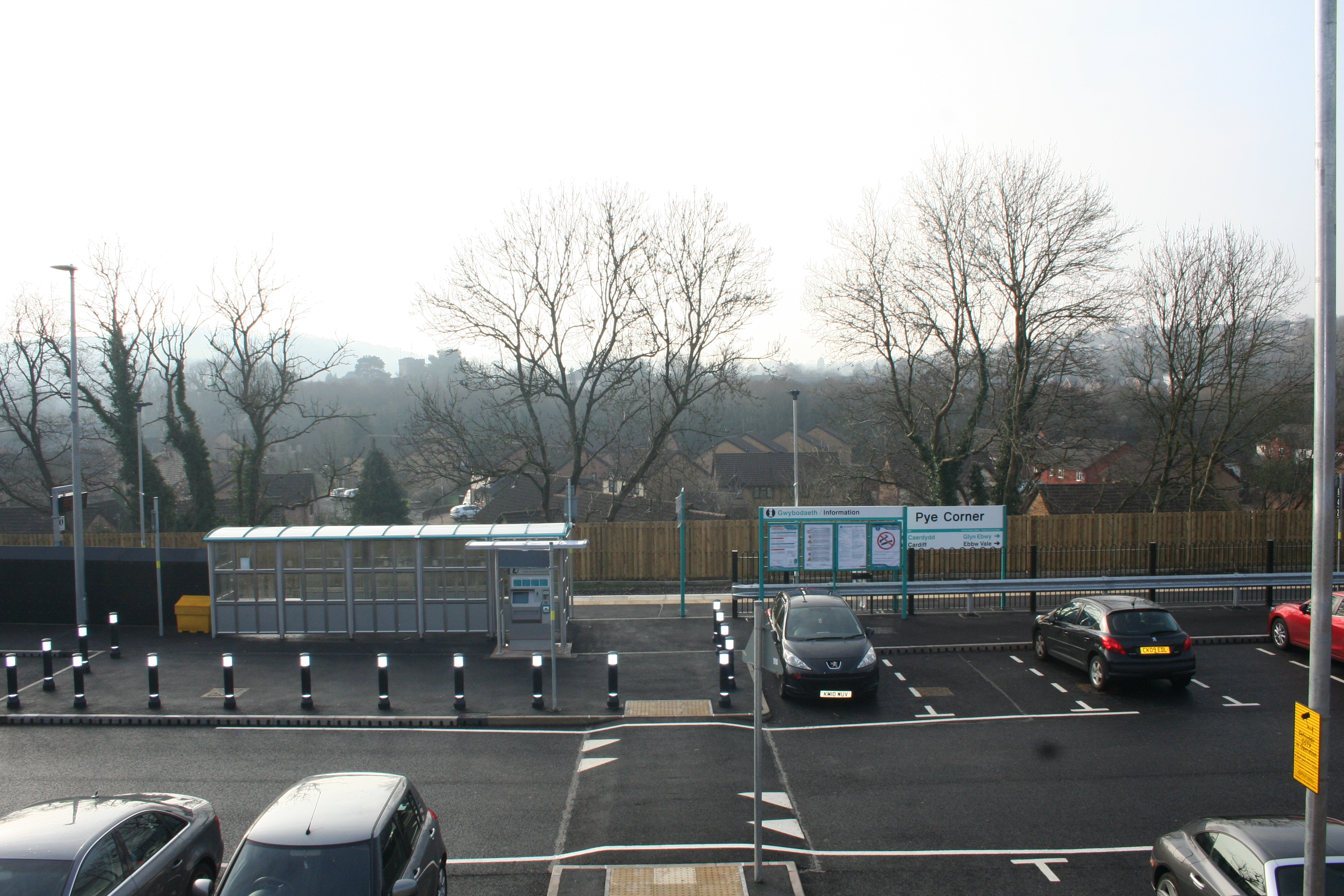
Pye Corner is one of the stations created by the New Stations Fund.

The New Stations Fund was a programme by the United Kingdom Department for Transport to partially fund new railway stations in conjunction with local authorities or developers. Initiated in 2013, it was incorporated into the Restoring Your Railway Fund when that was launched in 2020. The Restoring Your Railway Fund ceased to accept new proposals from November 2021 and was discontinued completely in 2024, bringing the New Stations Fund to an end.

== First round ==
The first round was launched in 2013 and funded £20m across five stations:

- Pye Corner opened 2014
- Newcourt opened 2015
- Lea Bridge opened 2016
- Ilkeston opened 2017
- Kenilworth opened 2018

== Second round ==
The second round was launched in 2016 and funded £16m across five stations:

- Warrington West opened 2019
- Horden opened 2020
- Bow Street opened 2021
- Reading Green Park opened 2023
- Portway Park & Ride opened 2023

== Third round ==
The third round was launched in 2020 and was originally worth £20m but later increased to £32m. Applications closed on 5 June 2020. The winners were announced in November 2020.

- Torquay Gateway
- Thanet Parkway opened on 31 July 2023
- St Clears
- Haxby
- Deeside Parkway

The third round was supplemented in May 2021 when an additional £15 million from the New stations Fund was allocated to build new stations at Marsh Barton in Exeter, and White Rose and Thorpe Park in Leeds. The latter pair had been proposed in a 2017 policy paper published by the Department for Transport. Marsh Barton station was opened on 4 July 2023.
