= Exeter St Thomas railway station =

Railway station in Exeter Devon, England

Exeter St Thomas
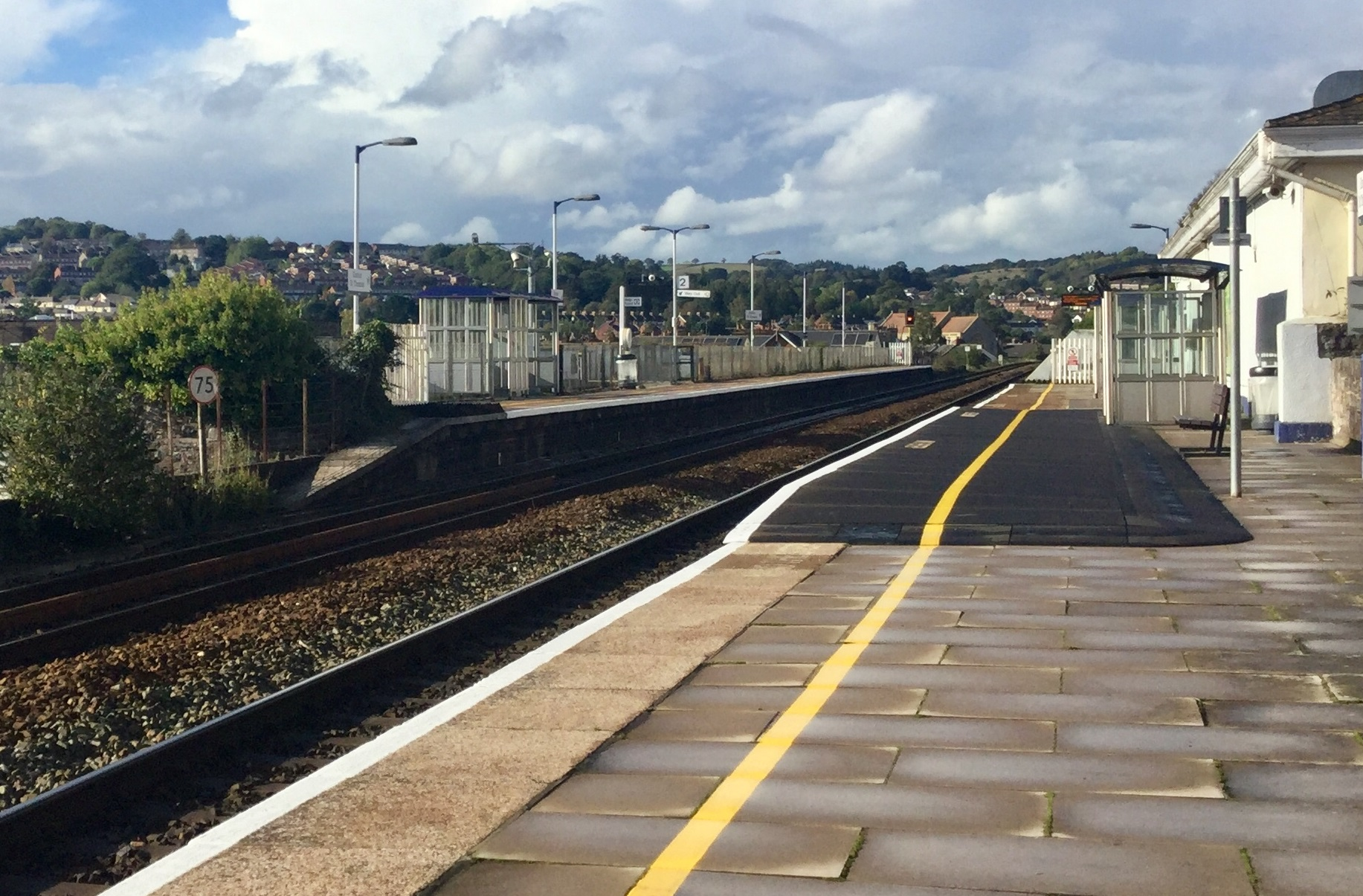

General information
- Location: St Thomas, Exeter; England
- Coordinates: 50.71713°N 3.53858°W
- Grid reference: SX914919
- Managed by: Great Western Railway
- Platforms: 2

Other information
- Station code: EXT
- Classification: DfT category F1

History
- Original company: South Devon Railway
- Pre-grouping: Great Western Railway
- Post-grouping: Great Western Railway

Key dates
- Opened: 30 May 1846

Passengers
- 2020/21: ▼0.122 million
- 2021/22: ▲0.205 million
- 2022/23: ▲0.264 million
- 2023/24: ▲0.297 million
- 2024/25: ▲0.329 million

Listed Building – Grade II
- Feature: Exeter St Thomas railway station
- Designated: 18 June 1974
- Reference no.: 1333347
Location
Notes
- Passenger statistics from the Office of Rail and Road

Exeter St Thomas railway station is a suburban railway station in Exeter, England, serving the suburb of St Thomas and the riverside area. The station is elevated on a low viaduct with entrances on Cowick Street and is the only station in Exeter which is listed (Grade II). It is 74 chains (0.93 mi; 1.5 km) south of Exeter St Davids railway station and 194 miles 66 chains (194.83 mi; 313.5 km) from the zero point at London Paddington, via Box Tunnel.

The station is unstaffed, the former station building now derelict. It is served mostly by local trains operated by Great Western Railway.

== History ==
The station was designed by Isambard Kingdom Brunel and opened on 30 May 1846 by the South Devon Railway. The company had joint use of the Bristol and Exeter Railway station at St Davids but St Thomas was its own station. Although built on a 501 yards (458 m) stone viaduct, the railway was nearer to the city centre and the quays on the Exeter Canal. Until 1862 tickets were only sold between St Thomas and stations west of Exeter, not to St Davids and the north.

The railway was worked by atmospheric trains from 13 September 1847 until 9 September 1848. Unique in all the South Devon Railway stations, there was no engine house, so the driver had to hold the train on its brakes against the pressure in the pipes while it was stopped here.

The original station featured just a single track with a 175 feet (53 m) platform on the city side of the line. A small booking office was built at road level at the north end of the station and steps led up to the platform. The viaduct was widened at this point by five feet to accommodate the platform.

In 1847 some improvements were completed including a larger office, a train shed over the platform, and an extension to bring the platform to a length of 260 feet.

In 1851 George Hennet was given permission to build a coal depot at St Thomas from where he could distribute coal, brought by train from his quay at Teignmouth. This was built on the city side of the line, north of the station. Hennet died in 1857 and the depot was eventually taken over by Robert Ward. It was closed in 1884 but Ward continued to use the land as premises until c. 1930. The site is now occupied by the Great Western Railway Staff Association staff club.

In 1861 the viaduct was widened on the west side (away from the city), and a second track brought into use which necessitated a second platform be built. Elegant new two-storey buildings were built on the city side of the viaduct, and a new train shed built across both platforms.

The train shed was demolished in the 1960s and the station is now unstaffed. The 1861 building was previously used as a Chinese restaurant and a nightclub. Since 2015 the building stands derelict and has fallen into disrepair with the doors and windows boarded up.

The station was proposed for closure in Dr. Beeching's The Reshaping of Britain's Railways report but has remained open.

== Services ==
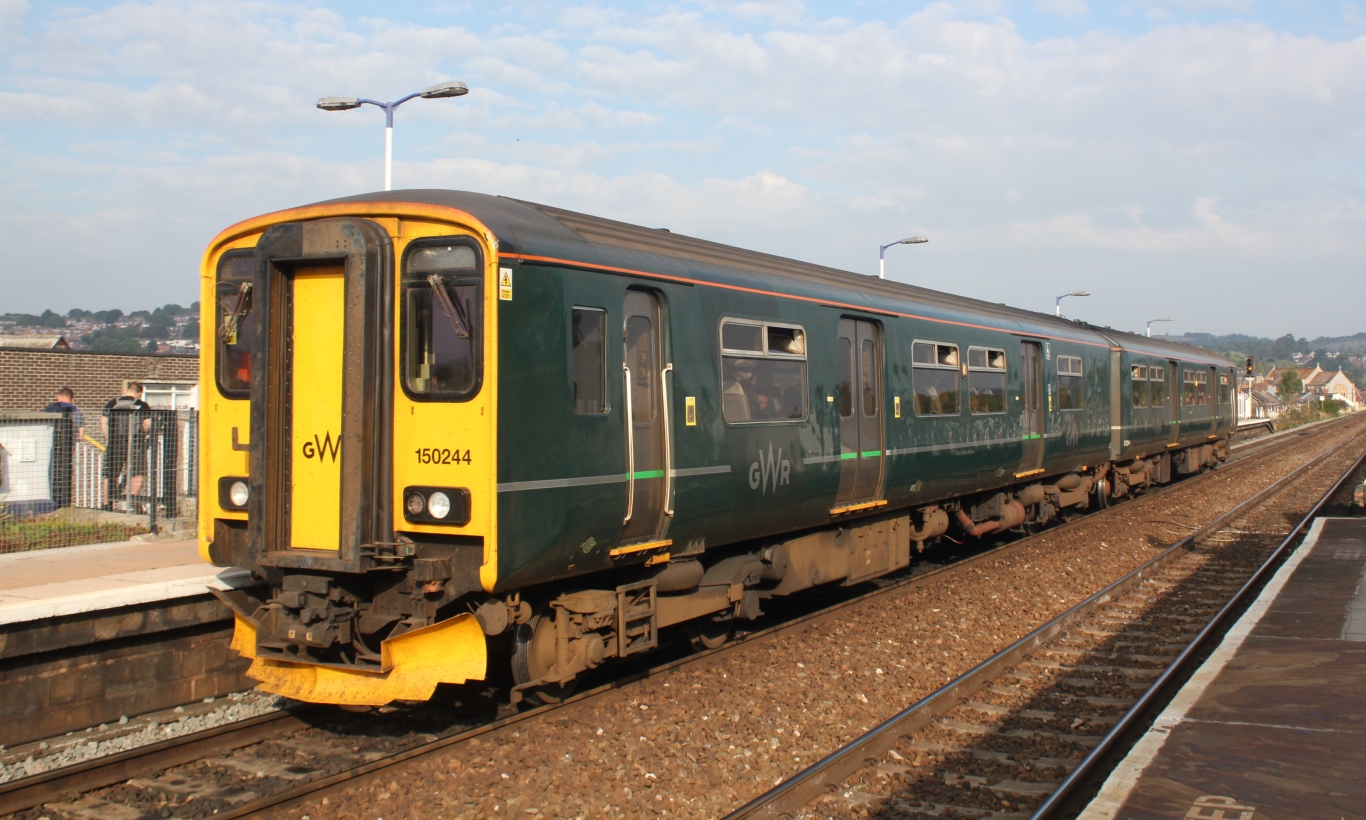
A Great Western Railway Class 150 going to Exmouth

Most trains are operated by Great Western Railway on the Riviera Line to and from Paignton which then generally continue east of Exeter St Davids to and from Exmouth along the Avocet Line. A few other services operate to destinations further afield such as Bristol Temple Meads.

Preceding station	National Rail	Following station
Marsh Barton towards Paignton	Great Western Railway Riviera Line	Exeter St Davids Terminus
