= Torre railway station =

Railway station in Devon, England

Torre
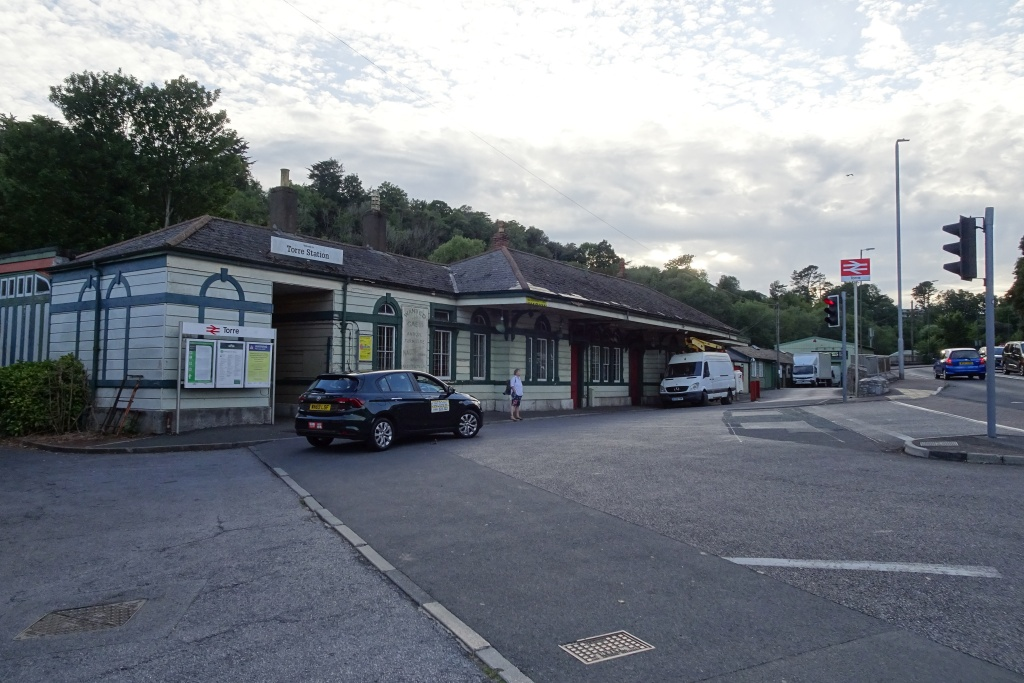

General information
- Location: Torquay, Torbay, Devon; England
- Coordinates: 50.4729°N 3.5463°W
- Grid reference: SX903648
- Managed by: Great Western Railway
- Platforms: 2

Other information
- Station code: TRR
- Classification: DfT category F2

History
- Original company: South Devon Railway
- Pre-grouping: Great Western Railway
- Post-grouping: Great Western Railway

Key dates
- 1848: Opened as Torquay
- 1859: Renamed Torre

Passengers
- 2020/21: ▼0.139 million
- 2021/22: ▲0.302 million
- 2022/23: ▲0.332 million
- 2023/24: ▲0.343 million
- 2024/25: ▲0.376 million

Listed Building – Grade II
- Feature: Torre railway station
- Designated: 10 January 1975
- Reference no.: 1218006
Location
Notes
- Passenger statistics from the Office of Rail and Road

Torre railway station serves the northern part of the town of Torquay, in Devon, England. It is on the Riviera Line, 219 miles 12 chains (353 km) from London Paddington, via Box. The station is managed by Great Western Railway but is not staffed. The station buildings are Grade II listed.

== History ==
A 7 ft (2,134 mm) broad gauge branch line was opened by the South Devon Railway from Newton Abbot on 18 December 1848; Torre was the terminus and known as Torquay. This line was extended by the Dartmouth and Torbay Railway on 2 August 1859, which opened the present Torquay railway station at Livermead so the original station was renamed Torre.

The station had a small extension to the single platform and a train shed built in 1855 but, with the opening of the Dartmouth and Torbay Railway, a new platform had to be provided. The original station can still be seen standing alongside the track just north of the platform.

Goods traffic was handled from October 1849. The goods yard was originally at the west end of the station. The original goods shed was destroyed by fire in 1857 and eventually replaced in 1865 by a stone building alongside the railway on the Newton Abbot side of the station. A coal yard was built on the west side of the station.

The South Devon Railway amalgamated with the Great Western Railway on 1 February 1876. The railway had been just a single track originally but, on 26 March 1882, the line to the north was doubled and a second platform opened. On 20 May 1892, the line was converted to 4 ft 8 1/2 in (1,435 mm) standard gauge.

The first signal box was opened in 1883 at the London end of the northbound platform; this was replaced in 1921 by a new three-storey building on that platform. The original signalling used just 16 levers; the new box contained 42.

The Great Western Railway was nationalised into British Railways on 1 January 1948. The buildings on the second platform were demolished in the 1960s and replaced by a simple brick-built shelter. Goods traffic was withdrawn on 4 December 1967.

The signal box was auctioned early in 2021.

| Preceding station | Historical railways | Following station |
|---|---|---|
| Newton Abbot | Great Western Railway | Torquay |

=== Accidents and incidents ===
On the afternoon of 17 June 1946, a passenger train from London Paddington station to Paignton collided with the rear of a freight train that was stationary north of Torre station. The signalman had made an error in setting the line as clear and so the passenger train had been allowed to leave Kingskerswell thinking the line was clear. Both lines were blocked and over 3,000 passengers had to be carried by bus between Newton Abbot and Torre.

Another collision happened on 26 April 1958, when a passenger train approaching from Newton Abbot passed through two danger signals and collided with a freight train that was shunting in the station.

=== Station name ===
In the Torbay Council Mayoral Vision of 2008, it was proposed that this station be renamed Torquay Central and the existing Torquay station renamed Torquay Seafront; however, this was not implemented.

== Services ==
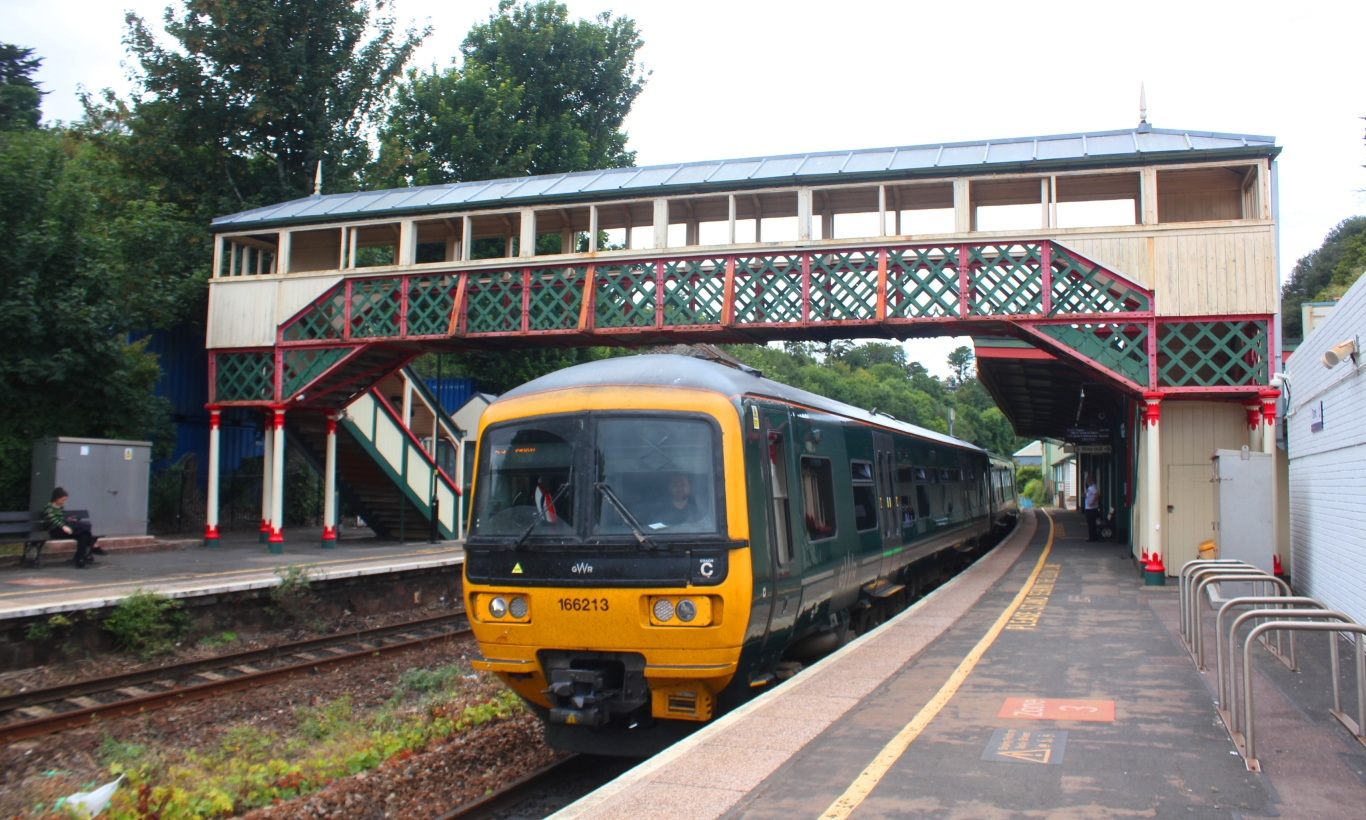
A Class 166 at Torre going towards Paignton

Torre is served by Great Western Railway local trains in both directions on an approximately half-hourly basis during the day. Most trains run between Exmouth and Paignton, though some start/finish at Newton Abbot; on Sundays the service is less frequent and most trains only run between Exeter St Davids and Paignton. Some longer-distance trains normally call here, such as the GWR Paignton to London Paddington route. As the station lies on the Riviera Line it sees many mainline charter services (including steam hauled) pass through, such as the Torbay Express which runs between Bristol Temple Meads and Kingswear on selected summer Sundays.

| Preceding station | National Rail | Following station |
|---|---|---|
| Torquay towards Paignton | Great Western Railway Riviera Line | Newton Abbot towards Exeter St Davids |

== Torquay engine house ==
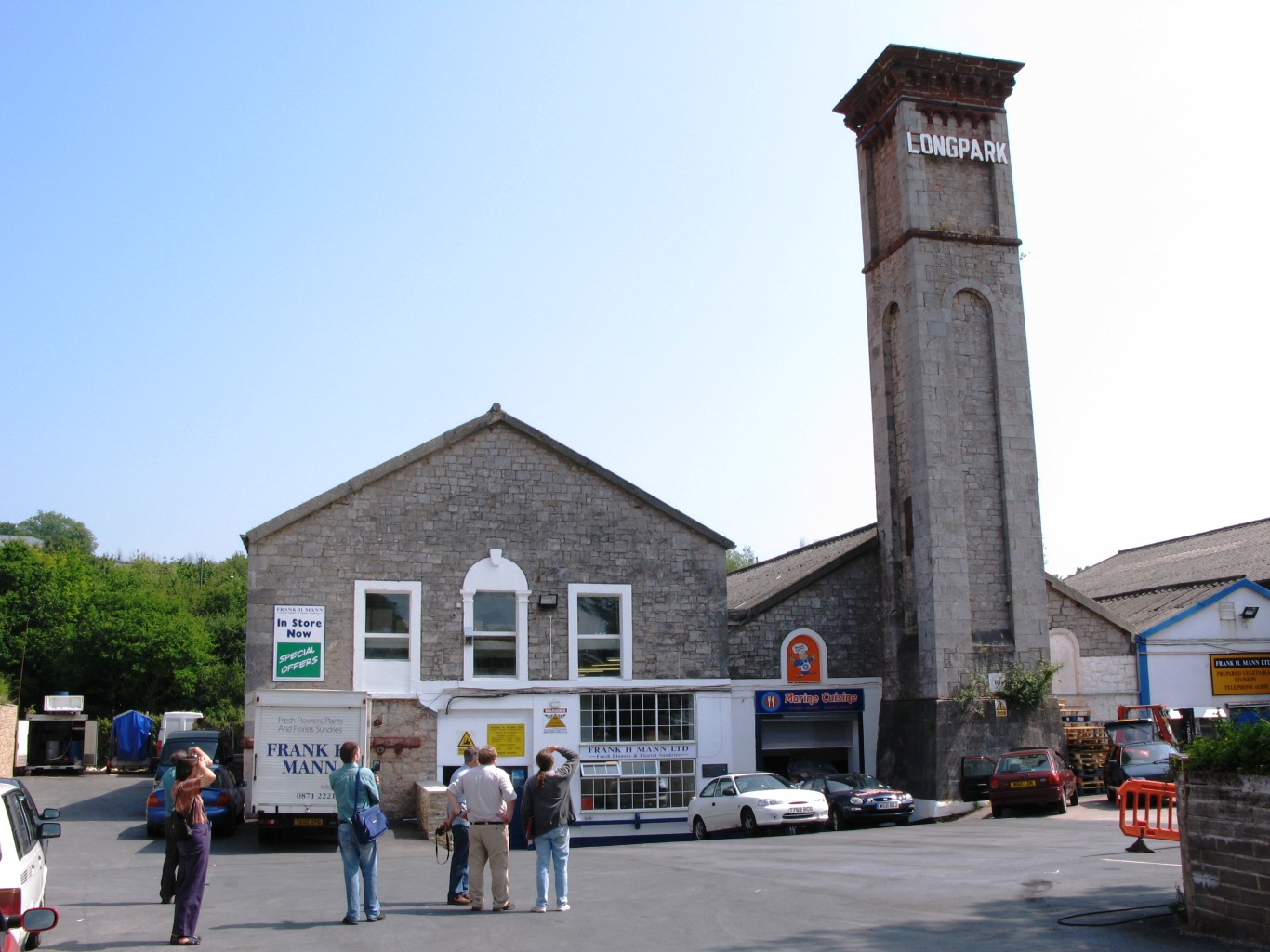
The engine house

The South Devon Railway was designed to be worked as an atmospheric railway, the trains propelled by stationary engines that created a vacuum in a pipe laid between the rails. An engine house was built a short distance to the north of the Torquay terminus that would have powered trains up the 1 in 75 (1.3%) gradient from the station, but it was never brought into use and conventional locomotives worked the trains instead.

The building still stands in Torquay Road near the Lidl supermarket (at 50.4854°N 3.5534°W). It was used for many years by the Longpark Pottery but is currently a fruit and vegetable warehouse. It can be glimpsed above the cutting on the right of trains approaching Torre from Newton Abbot.
