= Riviera Line =

Railway line in Devon, England

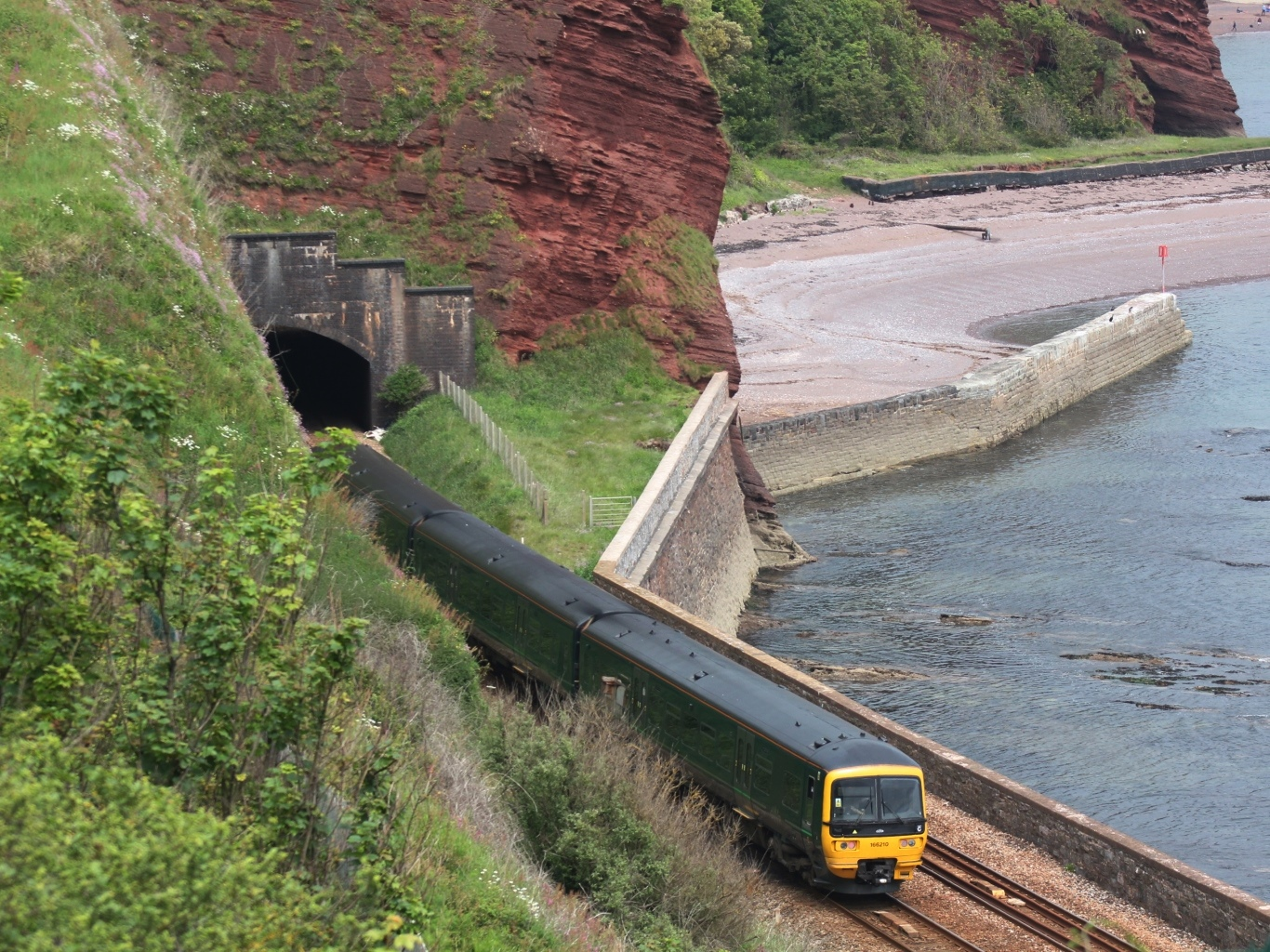
- The Riviera Line between Dawlish and Teignmouth

Overview
- Status: Open
- Owner: Network Rail
- Locale: Devon, England
- Termini: Exeter St Davids; Paignton
- Stations: 11

Service
- Type: Heavy rail
- System: National Rail
- Operator(s): Great Western Railway; CrossCountry
- Depot: Exeter Traction Maintenance Depot
- Rolling stock: Classes 150, 158, 166 also 220, 221, 800, 802

History
- Opened: 1846–59

Technical
- Line length: 28.25 miles (45 km)
- Number of tracks: 2
- Character: Main line
- Track gauge: 1,435 mm (4 ft 8 1/2 in) standard gauge
- Loading gauge: RA8 / W7 East of Newton Abbot; RA 6 / W6A West of Newton Abbot
- Operating speed: 60 mph (97 km/h)
Route map
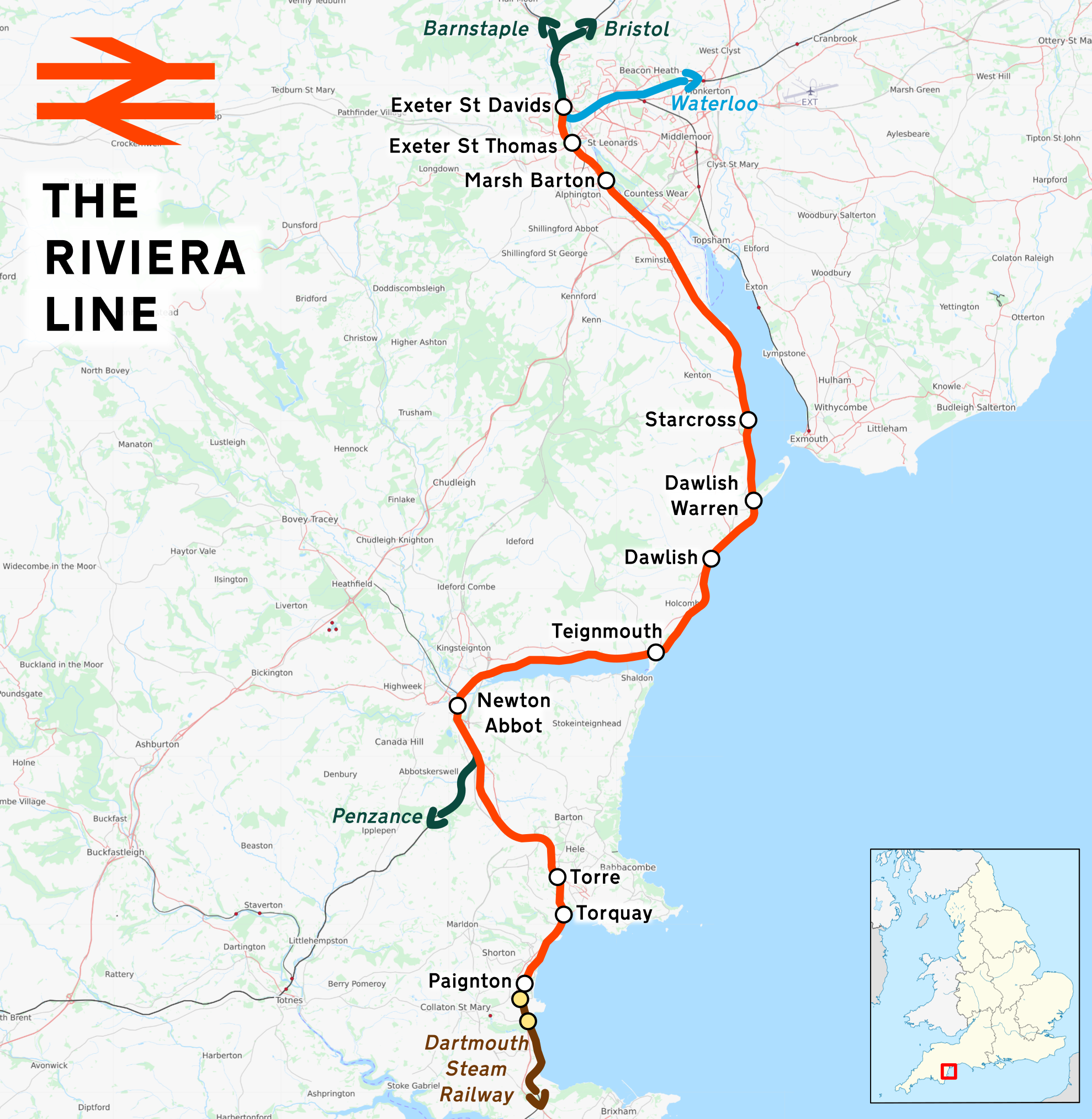
(Click to expand)

The Riviera Line is the railway between the city of Exeter, towns Dawlish and Teignmouth, and the English Riviera resorts of Torbay in Devon, England. Its tracks are shared with the Exeter to Plymouth Line along the South Devon sea wall. It is part of the Network Rail Route 12 (Reading to Penzance).

== History ==
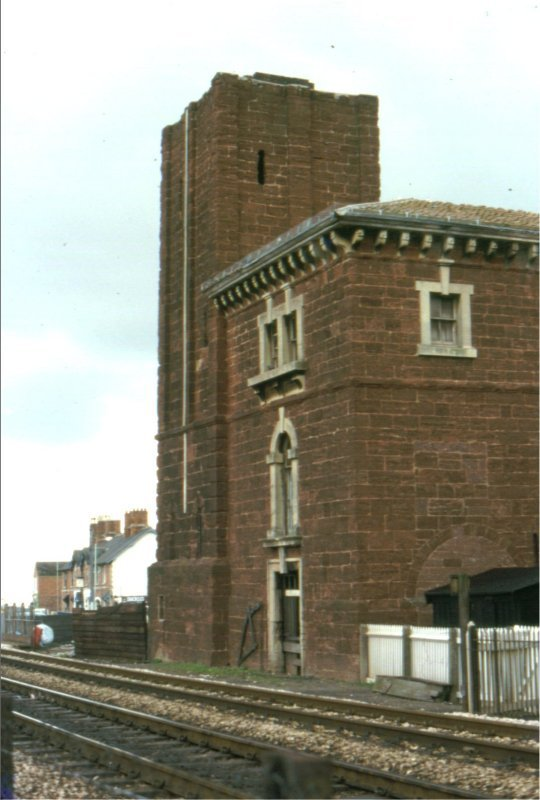
Starcross engine house

The line from Exeter to Teignmouth was opened by the South Devon Railway Company on 30 May 1846 and was extended to Newton Abbot on 30 December 1846. After the company had completed its main line to Plymouth, it opened a branch from Newton Abbot to Torquay (the present Torre railway station) on 18 December 1848. Nine years later, this was extended as the independent Dartmouth and Torbay Railway to Paignton on 2 August 1859.

These lines were built as single-track, 7 ft (2,134 mm) broad gauge railways by Isambard Kingdom Brunel. They were designed for atmospheric power and, although this was only used from 13 September 1847 until 9 September 1848, the remains of several of the South Devon Railway engine houses used for the stationary engines can still be seen by the side of the line. The track was converted to standard gauge on 21 May 1892. Double track was laid in sections over a period of several years, requiring the widening or removal of several tunnels near Teignmouth.

The Dartmouth and Torquay Railway was operated from the outset by the South Devon Railway and amalgamated with it in 1872. This company, in turn, amalgamated with the Great Western Railway on 1 February 1876. The GWR was nationalised on 1 January 1948 as part of British Railways.

In 1977, the Parliamentary Select Committee on Nationalised Industries recommended considering electrification of more of Britain's rail network and, by 1979, BR presented a range of options to do so by 2000. Some included electrifying the Bristol to Exeter line, Exeter to Plymouth Line, Riviera Line and Cornish Main Line. Under later governments, the proposal was not implemented. At present, there are no proposals to electrify the line or any others in Devon or Cornwall.

South West Trains operated some services between London Waterloo and Paignton via Salisbury for several years, as well as some to Plymouth or Penzance. From December 2009, their services only operated east of Exeter St. Davids.

== Services ==
Local passenger services on the line are currently operated by Great Western Railway. Mondays-Saturdays see an approximately half-hourly service calling at most stations, which runs beyond Exeter to and from Exmouth along the Avocet Line. On Sundays, a more restricted service operates, most of which terminate at Exeter.

Other services on the line include Great Western Railway express trains to/from London Paddington and CrossCountry services from the Midlands and the North. These mostly call only at Exeter St Davids, Dawlish, Teignmouth, Newton Abbot, Torquay and Paignton. Other long-distance services of the same operators call at Exeter, Dawlish, Teignmouth and Newton Abbot before continuing to Plymouth and sometimes Penzance.

== Infrastructure ==
Trains going towards Paignton are described as travelling in the "down" direction; those towards Exeter in the "up". The line is double track throughout except for a long single-lead junction at Newton Abbot where trains are turned off the main line onto the Paignton branch. Loops at Dawlish Warren allow slower trains to be overtaken, as does the flexible layout at Newton Abbot where all three platforms can access the Paignton branch. At Exeter St Davids, Riviera Line trains generally use platforms 1 and 3 as these are the only ones with access to and from Exeter Central and the Avocet line; starting or terminating trains may also use platforms 4, 5 and 6. At Paignton down trains generally arrive in platform 2; if they arrive in platform 1 they must shunt across to platform 2 before departure, generally via the sidings at Goodrington Sands.

Between Exeter and Newton Abbot the predominant speed limit is 60 miles per hour (97 km/h), the route availability is RA8, and freight loading gauge is W7. On the Paignton branch the predominant speed limit is 40 miles per hour (64 km/h), the route availability RA6, and the freight loading gauge W6A. Multiple aspect signals are controlled from the panel signal box at Exeter and allow a headway between trains of four minutes from there to Newton Abbot and seven minutes onwards to Paignton. The sea wall section is signalled for trains to run either way on the up (landward) line to allow for restricted working in the event of sea damage to the down line.

The Paignton branch has been identified as a "fragile route" where the addition of any further loco hauled traffic would have a significant impact on the residual life of track and/or structures. The three stations on the branch are currently under consideration for the provision of improved facilities but this is dependent on third-party funding being made available.

== Route description ==
The route is described from Exeter to Paignton for a passenger facing the direction of travel, which will put the sea on their left.

=== Exeter to Newton Abbot ===
Communities served: Exeter – Starcross (and Exmouth via a seasonal ferry service) – Dawlish Warren – Dawlish – Teignmouth – Newton Abbot

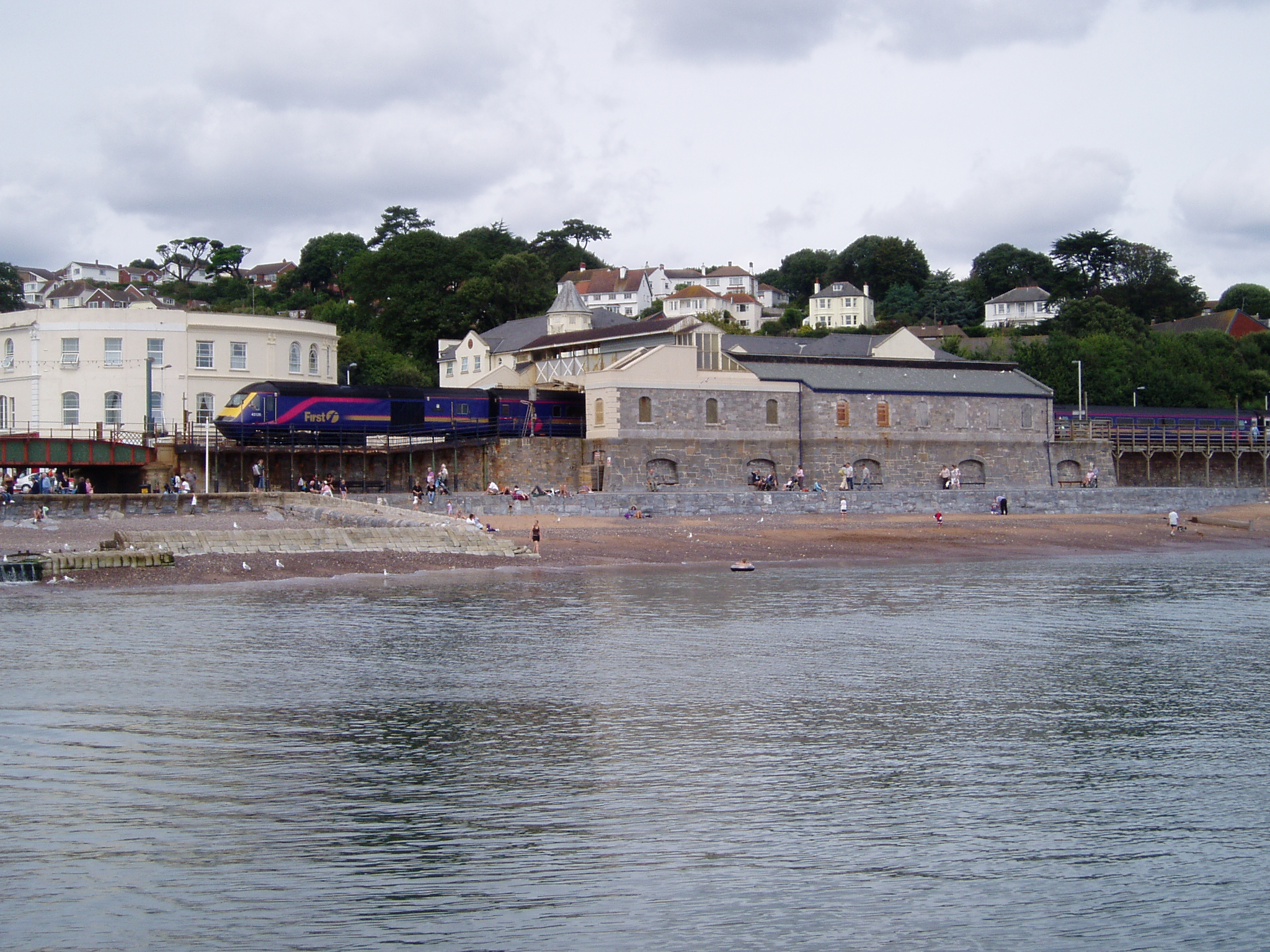
Dawlish station stands right on the beach

On leaving Exeter St Davids, the line crosses the River Exe and a parallel flood relief channel, then passes above the suburbs of Exeter along a stone viaduct on which is situated Exeter St Thomas railway station. The church of St David with its spire, and the older Exeter Cathedral, can be seen on the hill above the river. Beyond this is an industrial area where two lines used to branch out. On the left a short line went down to the Exeter Canal at City Basin; on the right a longer branch ran to Heathfield on the Newton Abbot to Moretonhampstead branch.

Once out in the countryside the line crosses marshes as it runs alongside the canal and river. What looks like a level crossing in the fields near Countess Wear is actually a lifting bridge across the canal. After passing the site of Exminster railway station the canal comes more clearly into view on the left and joins the River Exe, as does the railway, at Turf. The square pond next to the line is the site of Turf engine house. This stretch of the line used to have long water troughs between the rails from which steam locomotives could refill their water tanks without stopping.

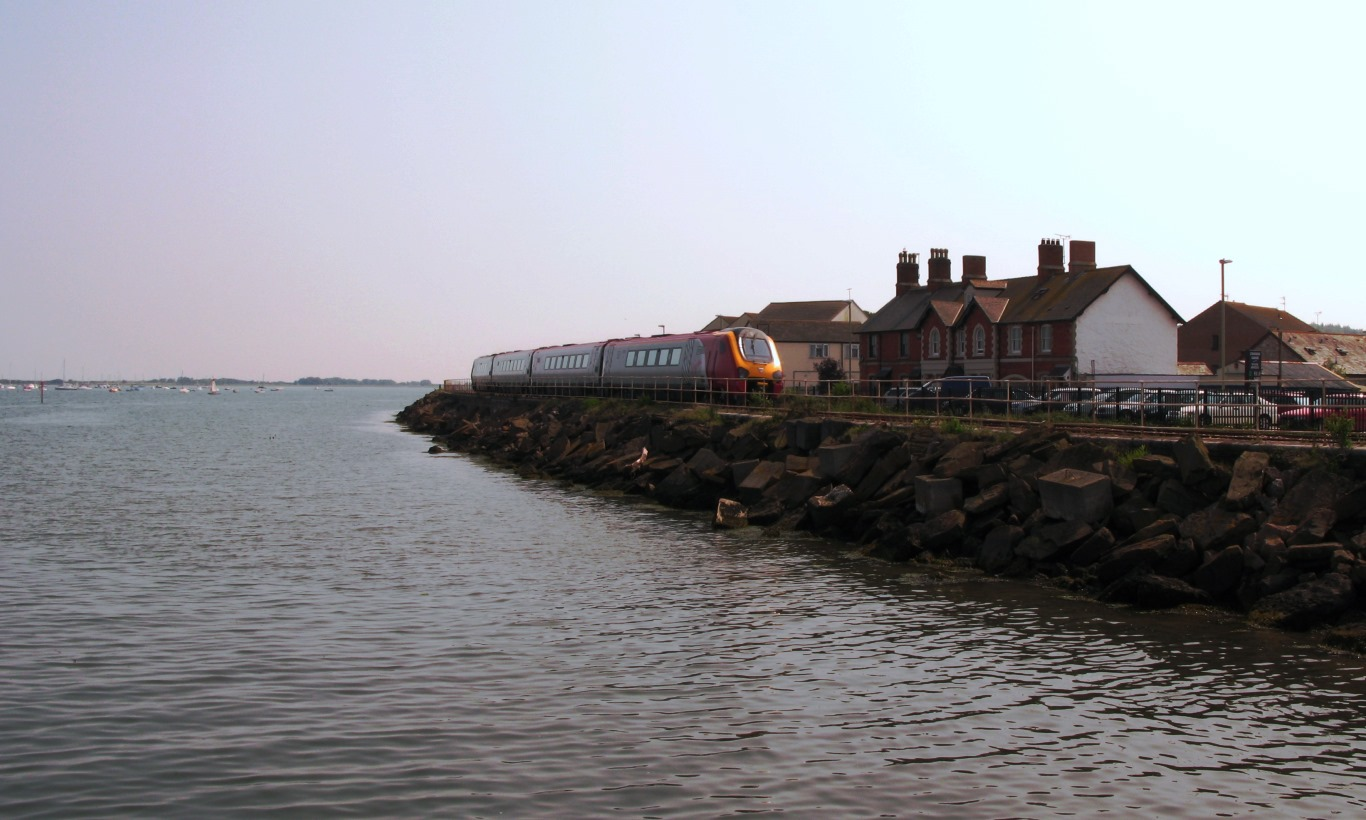
A Voyager train near Starcross

From Powderham Castle the railway is right alongside the river; on the right of the line is the castle's deer park, while on the left, across the river, trains on the Avocet Line may be seen near Lympstone Commando railway station. Our train now enters the village of Starcross; beyond Starcross railway station is the pier for the Exmouth to Starcross Ferry and the old Starcross engine house.

A little further along the river the railway crosses the mouth of Cockwood harbour. Near the shipwreck here was the 1,285 feet (392 m) long Exe Bight Pier, in use from 1869 for about ten years. Dawlish Warren now comes into sight; the sand dunes are home to a nature reserve where many wading and sea birds can be seen. The railway line opens out into four lines at Dawlish Warren railway station, where the platforms are alongside loop lines that allow fast trains to overtake stopping services.

On the left is the beach and seaside amusements; on the right are some camping coaches in the old goods yard. The railway now comes onto the Sea Wall which it shares with a footpath, although it quickly enters the short and deep cutting at Langstone Rock. Emerging above the beach, views can be had across the sea towards Torbay.

Approaching Dawlish railway station, Coastguard's Cottage is on the right. Although now a café, this building was used by the railway during its construction and then sold to the coastguard. Their boat house is below the footbridge. The town can be seen off to the right from Colonnade Viaduct at the other end of the station.

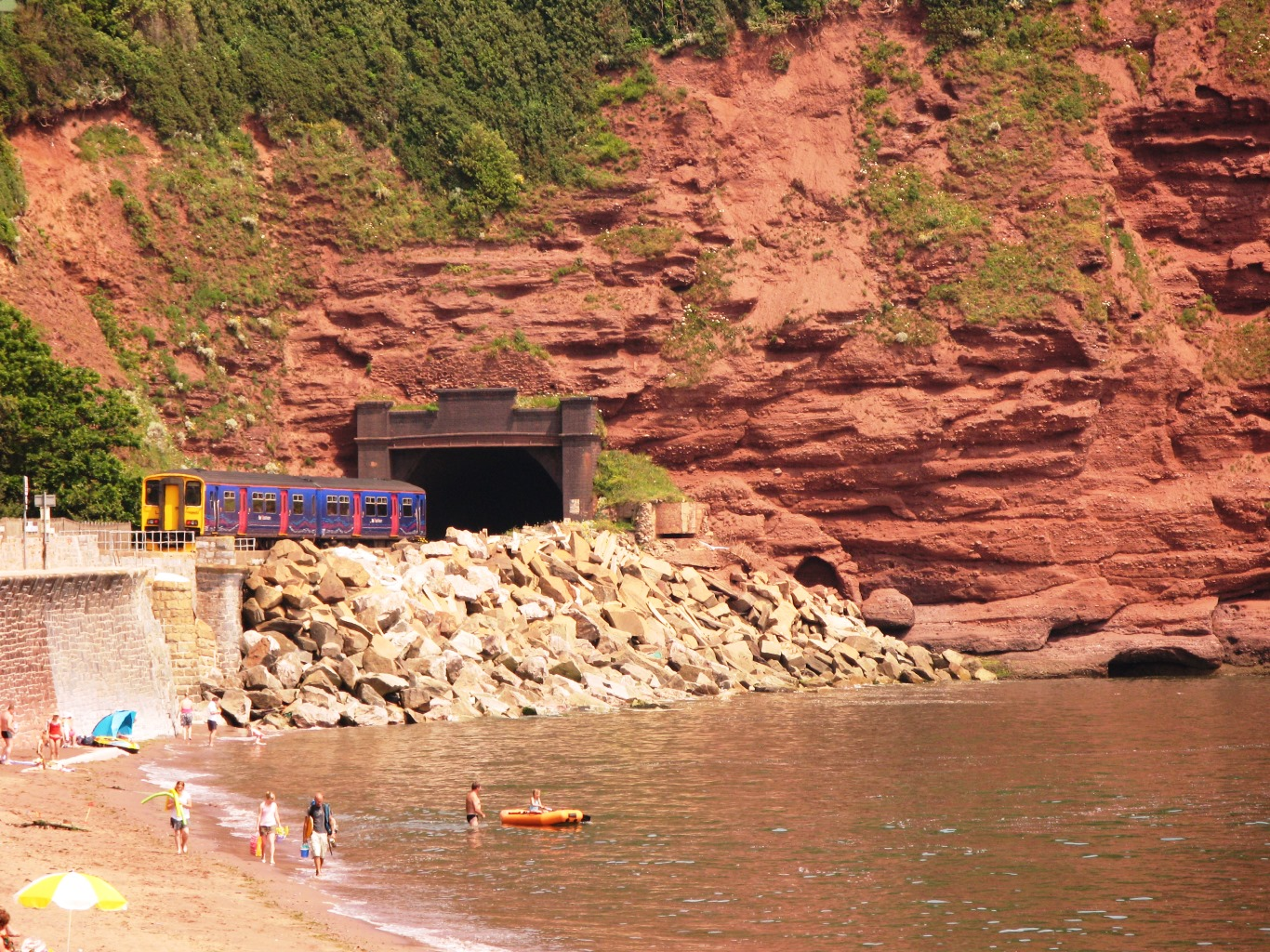
Parson's Tunnel

The line now enters its first tunnel, the 265 yards (242 m) Kennaway Tunnel beneath Lea Mount, beyond which is Coryton beach where the footpath along the Sea Wall ends, and then 227 yards (208 m) Coryton tunnel. The next beach is the private Shell Cove and then the railway passes through 49 yards (45 m) Phillot Tunnel and 58 yards (53 m) Clerk's Tunnel, emerging onto a section of sea wall at Breeches Rock before diving into 513 yards (469 m) Parson's Tunnel beneath Hole Head. The last two tunnels are named after the Parson and Clerk Rocks, two stacks in the sea off Hole Head. When the tunnel was dug the workers cut into a smugglers tunnel which ran from a hidden entrance above the cliff down to a secluded cove.

Beyond Parson's Tunnel is a short viaduct across Smugglers Lane and then the footpath resumes alongside the line for the final stretch of the Sea Wall past Sprey Point to the cutting at Teignmouth Eastcliff. On the right side of the railway near Sprey Point can be seen the remains of a lime kiln used during the construction of the line.

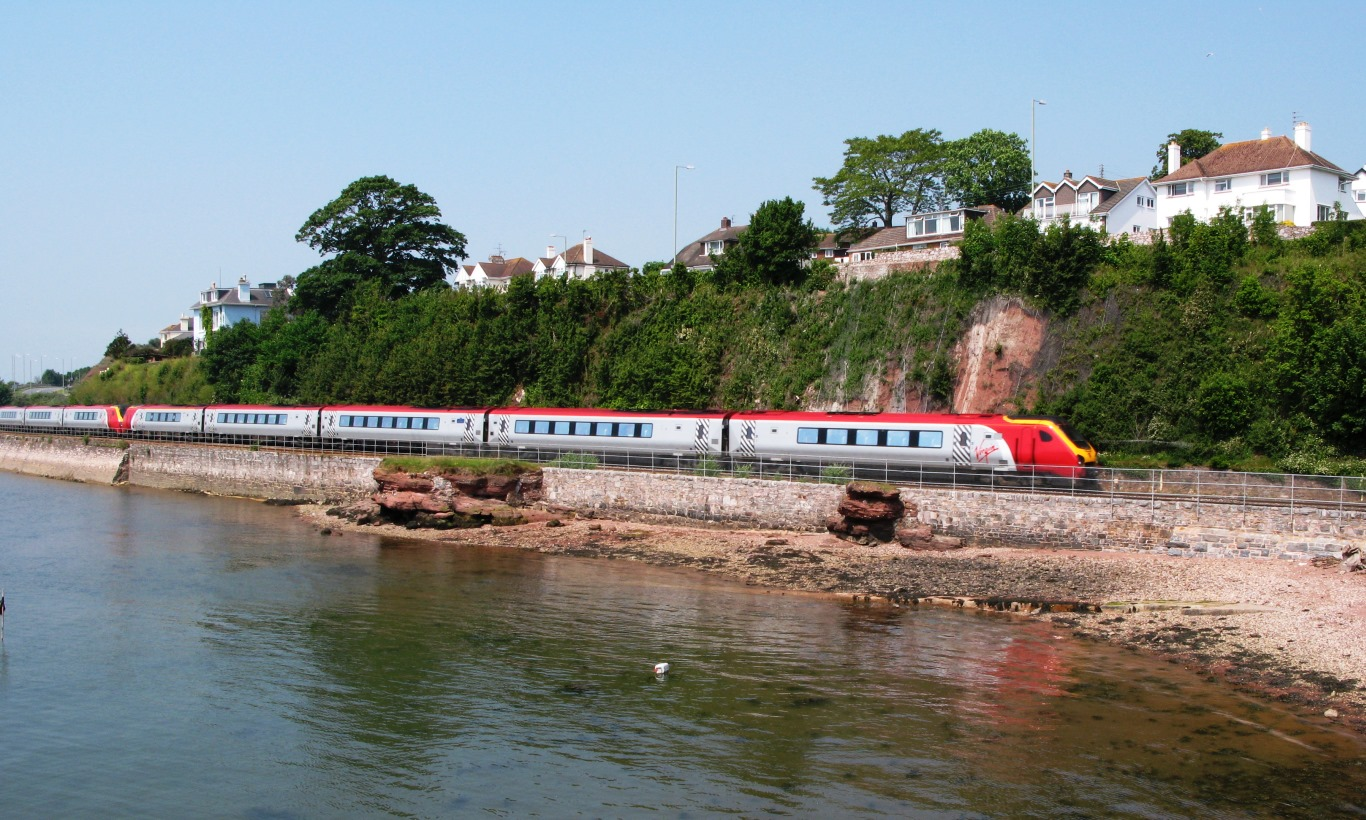
The River Teign near Shaldon Bridge

The railway passes through to Teignmouth railway station then continues through a cutting to emerge behind Teignmouth Harbour, after which the railway resumes its course alongside the water, the River Teign. The cuttings on both sides of the station were originally tunnels and were opened out between 1879 and 1884. The railway passes under the Shaldon Bridge and then follows the river past the small promontories at Flow Point, Red Rock, and Summer House, opposite which can be seen the waterside inn at Coombe Cellars.

After leaving the riverside the line crosses Hackney Marshes and passes between the railway sidings at Hackney Yard (left), and the race course and former Moretonhampstead branch (right). The industrial area to the left of Newton Abbot railway station is the site of the South Devon Railway Company locomotive workshops – the older stone buildings are the only surviving railway buildings.

=== Newton Abbot to Paignton ===
Communities served: Newton Abbot – Torquay – Paignton

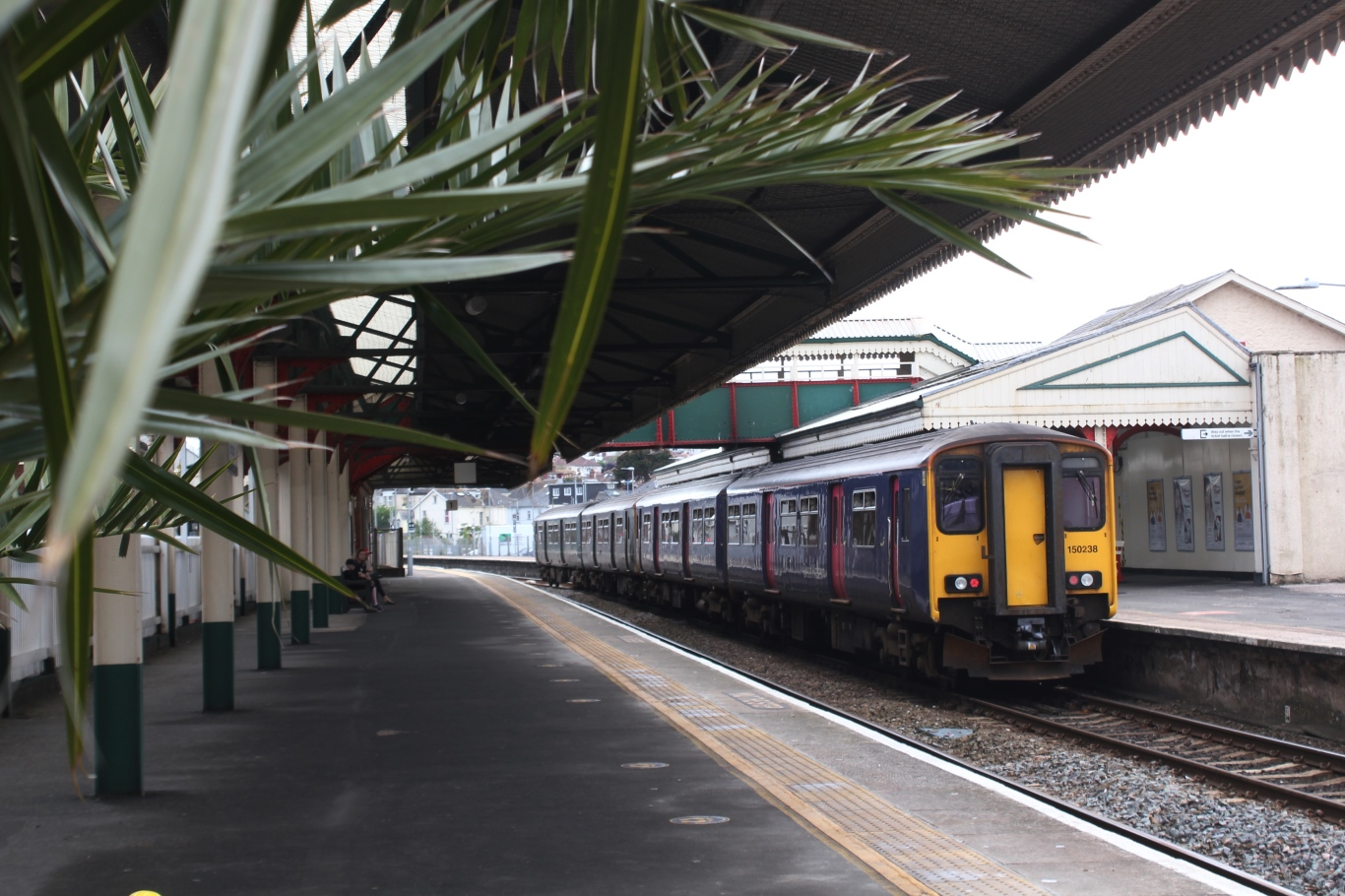
Journey's end at Paignton

Leaving Newton Abbot the railway widens out to four tracks; the two for Penzance diverge to the right at Aller Junction while the two for Paignton pass through the concrete beam 270m long Aller Tunnel, constructed in 2015 to carry the new South Devon Highway. From here the Riviera Line trains climb and then slowly descend towards the sea at Torquay. First though, they pass through the remains of the former Kingskerswell railway station.

Just before Torre railway station the line curves through a cutting; the Torquay engine house still stands on the top of the cutting on the right. The stone building on the left is the old goods shed, while sidings for coal traffic were situated on the opposite side of the line. The disused signal box on the eastbound platform was unusually tall to allow the signalman to look over the footbridge to see trains approaching up the steep gradient.

The train now descends this to reach Torquay railway station opened in 1859, although today's large stone buildings and old signal box date from 1878. Unlike the original Torquay station (now Torre), this one is right by the beach at Abbey Sands and a level promenade links it with the harbour and town centre.

On leaving the station the line passes beneath an ornamental cast iron bridge, through a small cutting, and then climbs alongside Livermead Beach to the site of Torquay Gas Works, now a park on the right of the line. It then passes a headland at Preston before dropping down again into Paignton, with more views of the beaches and sea. Immediately outside Paignton railway station is a busy level crossing right in the town centre. The ticket office is now situated in the 1859 goods shed; the bus station is right outside the front door while the Dartmouth Steam Railway is situated alongside on the other side of the station.

The railway line continues beyond the station to reach carriage sidings at Goodrington Sands and to provide a connection that allows special trains to run through to Kingswear over the heritage railway.

== Passenger volume ==
Traffic growth in recent years has been largely on the main line section between Exeter and Newton Abbot, although reduced in 2014 due to the Dawlish seawall breach.

Station usage
Station name	2002–03	2004–05	2005–06	2006–07	2007–08	2008–09	2009–10	2010–11	2011–12	2012–13	2013–14	2014–15	2015–16	2016–17	2017–18	2018–19	2019–20	2020–21	2021–22	2022–23	2023–24	2024–25
Exeter to Newton Abbot
Exeter St Thomas	45,681	64,295	76,964	80,199	82,677	97,656	103,488	116,172	137,346	196,198	186,982	213,848	219,232	251,170	250,980	243,144	224,132	122,038	205,426	264,396	296,812	329,086
Marsh Barton	—N/a	—N/a	—N/a	—N/a	—N/a	—N/a	—N/a	—N/a	—N/a	—N/a	—N/a	—N/a	—N/a	—N/a	—N/a	—N/a	—N/a	—N/a	—N/a	—N/a	62,640	108,848
Starcross	58,384	69,175	76,771	84,968	83,701	85,262	83,066	91,166	101,048	107,060	100,178	101,004	111,316	142,850	125,898	116,170	111,744	38,644	90,972	107,120	112,584	107,218
Dawlish Warren	55,275	69,763	74,045	80,275	94,252	99,742	114,376	130,322	141,048	145,712	138,966	157,212	166,248	182,366	188,140	189,756	186,548	88,954	233,636	233,060	242,858	248,086
Dawlish	265,036	281,659	293,164	325,911	369,382	395,976	400,922	437,742	480,464	507,058	484,174	556,796	526,736	530,212	535,964	536,152	519,582	223,894	481,282	510,574	534,856	580,660
Teignmouth	286,471	318,532	331,048	364,910	418,162	437,746	451,154	505,046	566,528	592,413	566,620	602,886	640,112	681,046	694,062	705,732	690,972	269,248	606,756	691,384	728,100	760,568
Newton Abbot	636,901	720,606	731,694	782,310	856,010	929,268	940,862	1,021,530	1,088,094	1,102,732	1,057,340	1,141,040	1,170,480	1,193,454	1,230,844	1,234,672	1,203,100	434,744	977,212	1,155,346	1,183,296	1,334,872
Newton Abbot to Paignton
Torre	138,305	153,214	150,974	139,572	133,619	145,478	154,776	178,564	224,072	234,206	239,380	274,708	306,802	295,076	289,444	281,138	290,116	139,330	301,996	331,844	343,028	376,492
Torquay	284,566	298,494	292,701	307,520	341,916	370,886	360,418	381,072	407,722	428,436	409,600	457,724	488,854	505,384	513,832	483,450	457,528	168,810	412,594	455,448	464,904	508,086
Paignton	336,321	345,738	335,491	372,167	427,368	457,948	471,782	504,648	555,180	571,558	567,440	631,506	678,656	677,904	672,366	676,342	632,482	237,744	577,996	636,400	651,194	707,018
The annual passenger usage is based on sales of tickets in stated financial years from Office of Rail and Road estimates of station usage. The statistics are for passengers arriving and departing from each station and cover twelve-month periods that start in April. Methodology may vary year on year. Usage since the period 2019–20 have been affected by the COVID-19 pandemic, especially the period 2020–23.

The statistics are for passengers arriving and departing from each station and cover twelve-month periods that start in April.

== Plans ==
In 2009 the Association of Train Operating Companies identified Brixham as one of fourteen towns for which the provision of a new railway service would have a positive benefit-cost ratio. This would be an extension of the Great Western Railway service beyond Paignton to Churston station on the Dartmouth Steam Railway, which would then act as a railhead for Brixham. It would also serve other housing developments in the area since the opening of the steam railway, and may require the doubling of that line between Paignton and Goodrington Sands.

== South West Coast Path ==
The South West Coast Path is the longest national trail in the United Kingdom and the Riviera Line runs alongside it for much of its length. The Path crosses the River Exe on the ferry to Starcross station and then follows the road to Dawlish Warren where it joins the Sea Wall to Dawlish. It then climbs up onto the cliffs above Kennaway Tunnel before rejoining the Sea Wall at Parsons Tunnel to follow the line to Eastcliff at Teignmouth.

It again follows closely from Abbey Sands (by Torquay station) to Preston Sands at Paignton. It also follows alongside the Dartmouth Steam Railway from Goodrington to Broadsands, the beach near Churston railway station.

The Path thus gives opportunities to observe trains at close hand, and also provides links for linear walks between stations, including Kingswear.

== Storm damage ==
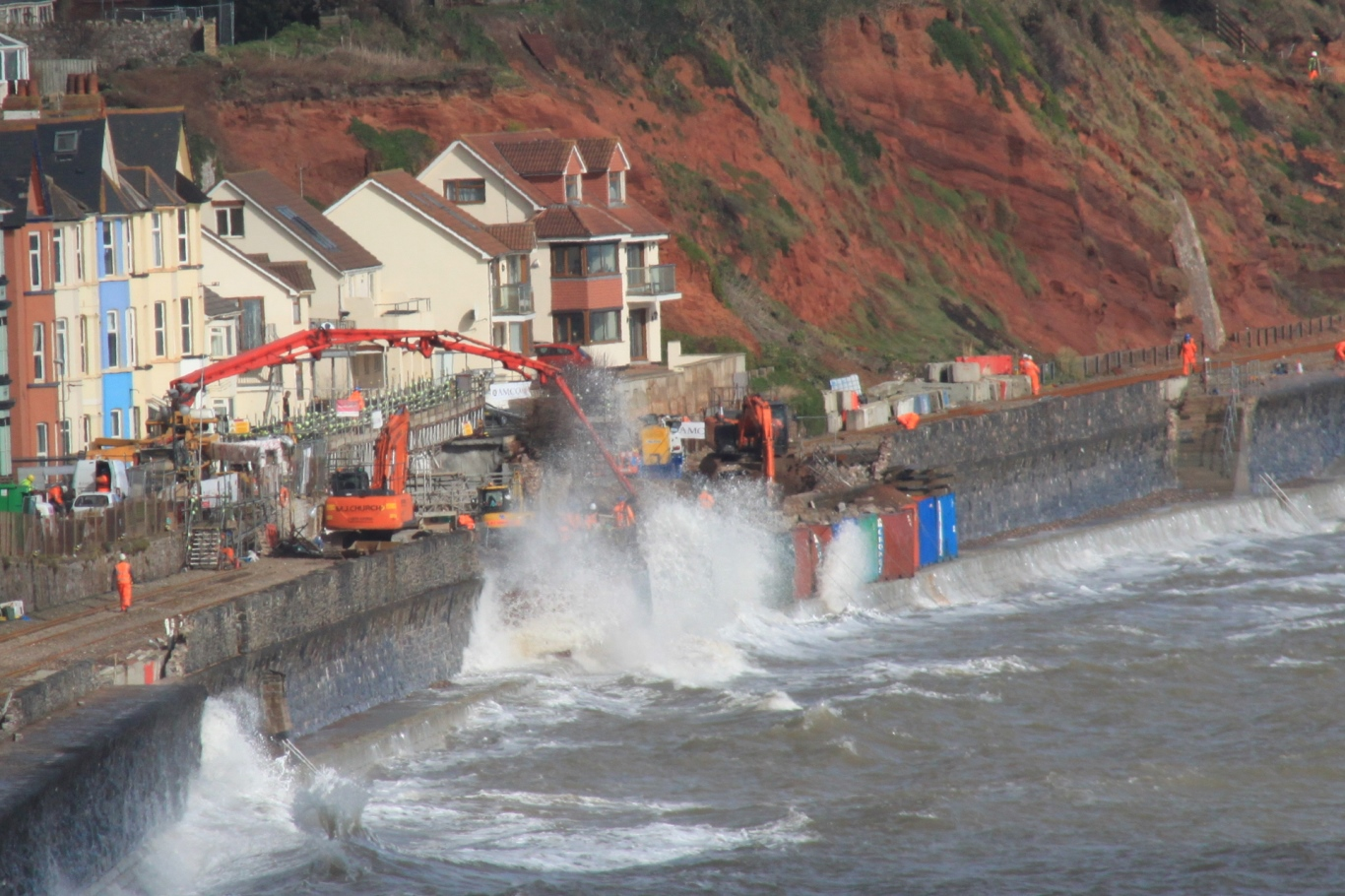
Repairing the main breach of the sea wall between Dawlish warren and Dawlish

The sea wall has always been prone to damage during stormy weather as it runs alongside the open sea at the base of cliffs for four miles. The first time this occurred was in September 1846, just a few months after the line opened. The most recent closure happened on 23 January 2026 when part of the sea wall at Dawlish collapsed, and Network Rail disrupted the line until 2 days later.

== Sources and further reading ==
- Beck, Keith; Copsey, John (1990). The Great Western in South Devon. Didcot: Wild Swan Publications. ISBN 0-906867-90-8.
- Central Publicity Unit (Winter 1979). Railway Electrification. British Railways Board. pp. 0–2, 8.
- Great Western Railway (1924). Number 1 – Paddington to Penzance. Through the Window. London: Great Western Railway. pp. not cited.
- Hesp, Martin (7 July 2008). "My magnificent rail journey". Western Morning News. Archived from the original on 25 November 2010.
- St John Thomas, David (1973). West Country Railway History. Newton Abbot: David and Charles. ISBN 0-7153-6363-8.
