= Monkerton railway station =

Railway station in Devon, England

Coordinates: 50.7259°N 3.4822°W

Monkerton is a proposed railway station in the hamlet of Monkerton, in Exeter, Devon, England, and is proposed as part of the "Devon Metro" plans. It would be built at a later date than the other proposed stations and is planned to be located between Polsloe Bridge and Digby & Sowton stations.
