= Moorside, North Tyneside =

Coordinates: 55.04°N 01.53°W

Moorside
- Location within Tyne and Wear
- Population: 692 (2011 Census)
- OS grid reference: NZ301722
- Metropolitan borough: North Tyneside
- Metropolitan county: Tyne and Wear
- Region: North East
- Country: England
- Sovereign state: United Kingdom
- Post town: NEWCASTLE UPON TYNE
- Postcode district: NE27
- Dialling code: 0191
- Police: Northumbria
- Fire: Tyne and Wear
- Ambulance: North East
- UK Parliament: North Tyneside

Moorside is a social housing estate near Backworth and Shiremoor. It was built in 1938 to accommodate the miners of the nearby Backworth pit and consists of a large housing estate, a few shops and a veterinary practice.

There is a Catholic church located in Moorside, although it is usually stated as being situated in Backworth.

In the early 2000s, a new community was built over the road from Moorside. It is called Northumberland Park.
