= Marsh Barton railway station =

Railway station in Devon, England

Marsh Barton
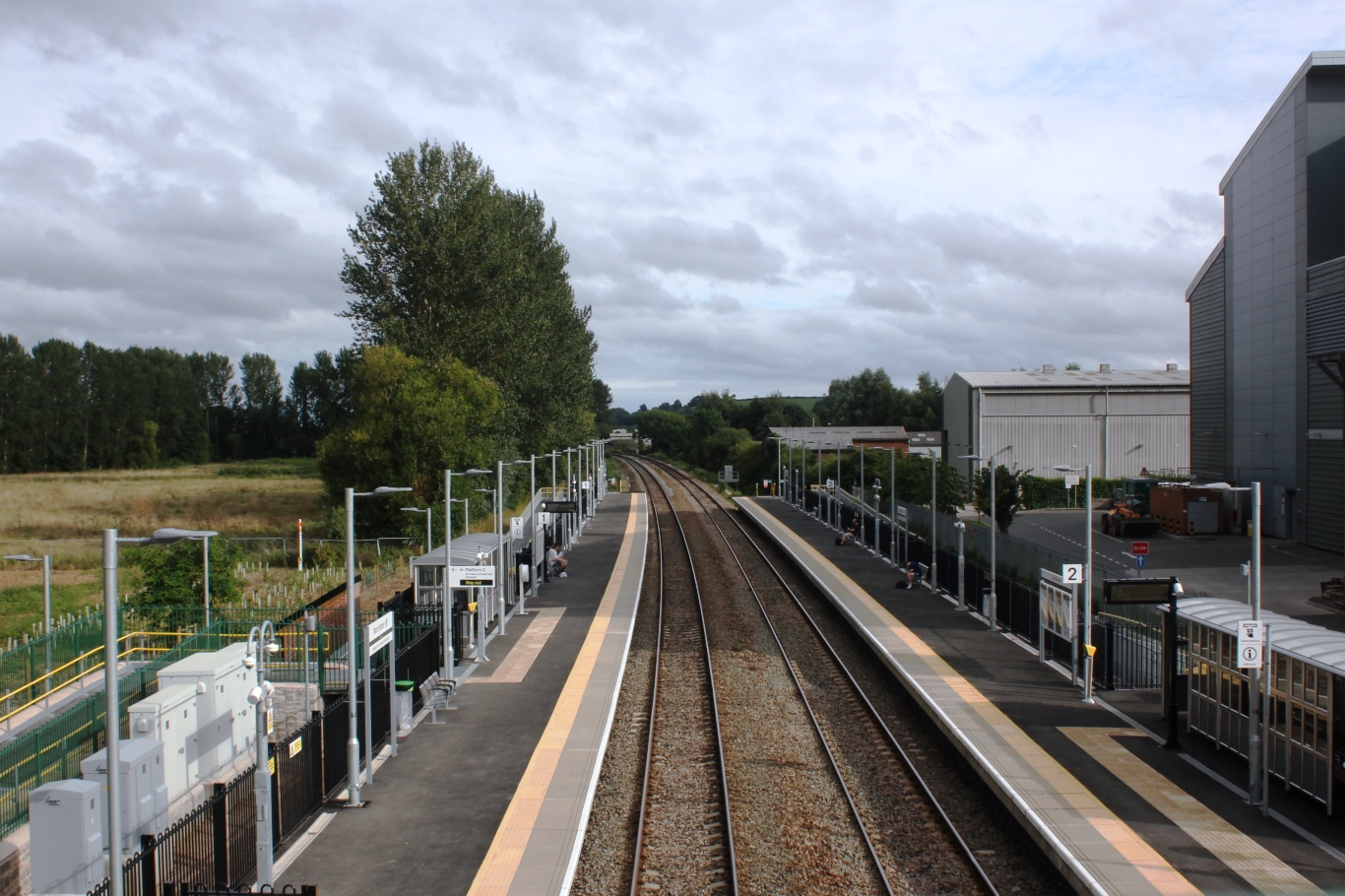
- A view of the station looking south

General information
- Location: Clapperbrook Lane East; Devon; England
- Coordinates: 50.704°N 3.521°W
- Grid reference: SX926905
- Operator: Great Western Railway
- Manager: Great Western Railway
- Line: Riviera Line
- Distance: 196 mi (315 km) from London
- Platforms: 2
- Tracks: 2

Construction
- Parking: Disabled only
- Cycle facilities: Yes
- Accessible: Yes

Other information
- Station code: MBT

History
- Opened: 4 July 2023

Passengers
- 2023–2024: 62,640
- 2024–2025: ▲0.109 million
- 2025–2026: ▲0.117 million
Location

Marsh Barton railway station is in the Marsh Barton area of Exeter, Devon England. It also provides access to the Riverside Valley Park alongside the River Exe. It opened on 4 July 2023 and is on the Riviera Line between Exeter St Thomas and Starcross stations, 2 miles 8 chains (3.4 km) from Exeter St Davids.

== History ==
Marsh Barton had been identified as a strategic employment area in local planning policy and a new station would support employment development. Plans for the station were developed by Network Rail and Devon County Council as part of the 'Devon Metro' proposal.

Work was planned to start on the station in early 2017 and Devon County Council hoped that it would be open in December 2017, Devon County Council said in April 2020 that a decision had been made to prioritise this station over a possible reopening of Exminster railway station, and the station was approved by the council in December 2020. Construction work began at Marsh Barton in April 2021 with the station then expected to be open by the end of 2022. The station was expected to cost £16 million.

The station was opened by Mark Harper, the Secretary of State for Transport on Monday, 3 July 2023 and public services started the next day.

== Description ==
Marsh Barton station is at milepost 196 miles (315 km) (measured from London Paddington station on the original route via Bristol) and 2 miles 8 chains (3.4 km) from Exeter St Davids. It is situated off Clapperbrook Lane East, adjacent to an energy from waste (EfW) plant.

There are two 124 m (407 ft) platforms. Platform 1 is on the east side of the line for trains towards Paignton and platform 2 is on the west side for trains towards Exeter. Facilities include waiting shelters, ticket machines and cycle parking.

== Passengers ==
The number of journeys starting or ending at Marsh Barton each year total more than 100,000.

Passengers by year
| Year (Note: The passenger data covers twelve month periods that start in April.) | Entries and exits |
|---|---|
| 2023–2024 | 62,640 |
| 2024–2025 | 108,848 |
| 2025–2026 | 116,590 |

== Services ==
All services at Marsh Barton are operated by Great Western Railway. The general service is one train each hour in each direction between Paignton and Exmouth via Exeter St Davids with additional services during the peak hours.

| Preceding station | National Rail | Following station |
|---|---|---|
| Starcross towards Paignton | Great Western Railway Riviera Line | Exeter St Thomas towards Exeter St Davids |
