= Vauxhall railway station (Merseyside) =

Proposed railway station in Merseyside, England

Vauxhall (Merseyside)

General information
- Location: Vauxhall, Liverpool, England
- Manager: Merseyrail
- Transit authority: Merseytravel
- Platforms: 2

Key dates
- 2006: Proposed
Location

Vauxhall is a proposed railway station in the Vauxhall area of Liverpool, in Merseyside, England. It is planned to be sited between Moorfields and Sandhills, on Merseyrail's Northern Line.

== Proposals ==
Construction of the new station was proposed in the 2006 Merseyside Local Transport Plan, where it is listed as Vauxhall/Stanley Dock.

The station was included in the 2014 Liverpool City Region Long Term Rail Strategy; in January 2017, it was again proposed by Mayor of Liverpool, Joe Anderson, as part of the city's North Docks project and also Everton Football Club's new stadium in the area.

Preceding station	National Rail	Following station
	Future services	
Sandhills	Merseyrail; Northern Line	Moorfields

== Business case ==
In February 2025, Everton FC's Bramley Moore Dock Stadium opened with a test event with 10,000 fans, a fifth of the stadium's planned capacity. Severe overcrowding at Sandhills, the nearest current station, has led to renewed calls for a new station.
