= Edginswell railway station =

Proposed railway station in Torquay, England

Coordinates: 50.4865°N 3.5567°W

Edginswell railway station is a proposed station in the Edginswell area of Torquay, Devon. The station would be located on the Riviera Line between Newton Abbot and Torre stations. Services to and from the station will link towards Paignton, Newton Abbot, Exeter and Exmouth. Edginswell will be the location of employment and housing development and the new station will support this development. The station would also serve Torbay Hospital, the Willows retail park and the Torquay Gateway development area.

== Proposals and funding ==
Torbay Council approved plans on 27 November 2016 for the construction of a new railway station to include the following: two single-sided station platforms, provision of a footbridge between platforms, an elevated walkway and access ramps, cycle spaces, extended footpath along Riviera Way, lighting and CCTV, and platform furniture to include shelter and signage. The proposed development to which the application relates is situated within 10 metres of relevant railway land. Lack of funding has prevented any construction work.

Approval of planning permission expired November 2019. A new application for funding was made in June 2020 for a new design incorporating lifts instead of ramps. If government funding is approved a new planning application would be made. The station was awarded £7.8m from the New Stations Fund in November 2020.

It was reported in 2022 that the cost of the station will be £13.1 million. It will be paid for by £3 million of Town Deal funds along with other town council funds, Section 106 contributions, Local Transport Capital Funds and the New Stations Funds already received. It was intended that a planning application would be submitted in the summer of 2022 and construction could start a year later with the station open by the end of 2024. A planning application (Torbay Council ref P/2023/0708) was submitted in August 2023, which was approved in November.

Preceding station	Future services	Following station
Newton Abbot	Great Western Railway Riviera Line	Torre
