= Moorside railway station (Cumbria) =

Proposed railway station in Cumbria, England

Coordinates: 54°33′0″N 3°35′16.8″W

Moorside is a proposed railway station on the Cumbrian Coast Line which would serve Moorside nuclear power station. A second railway station to be sited at Mirehouse further north on the line, has also been proposed to serve the accommodation for the workers of the construction phase of the nuclear power station.
