= South Devon Railway =

South Devon Railway may refer to:

- South Devon Railway Company - the company that built the railway from Exeter to Plymouth
- South Devon Railway (heritage railway) - the heritage railway from Totnes to Buckfastleigh
- South Devon Railway Engineering - rolling stock engineering company based at Buckfastleigh

Other heritage railways in South Devon include:

- Paignton and Dartmouth Steam Railway

Other early railways in South Devon include:

- Buckfastleigh, Totnes and South Devon Railway
- Dartmouth and Torbay Railway
- Launceston and South Devon Railway
- Lee Moor Tramway
- Moretonhampstead and South Devon Railway
- Plymouth and Dartmoor Railway
- Plymouth, Devonport and South Western Junction Railway
- South Devon and Tavistock Railway
- Torbay and Brixham Railway
