= Greenway Halt railway station (Devon) =

Heritage railway station in Devon, England

Greenway Halt
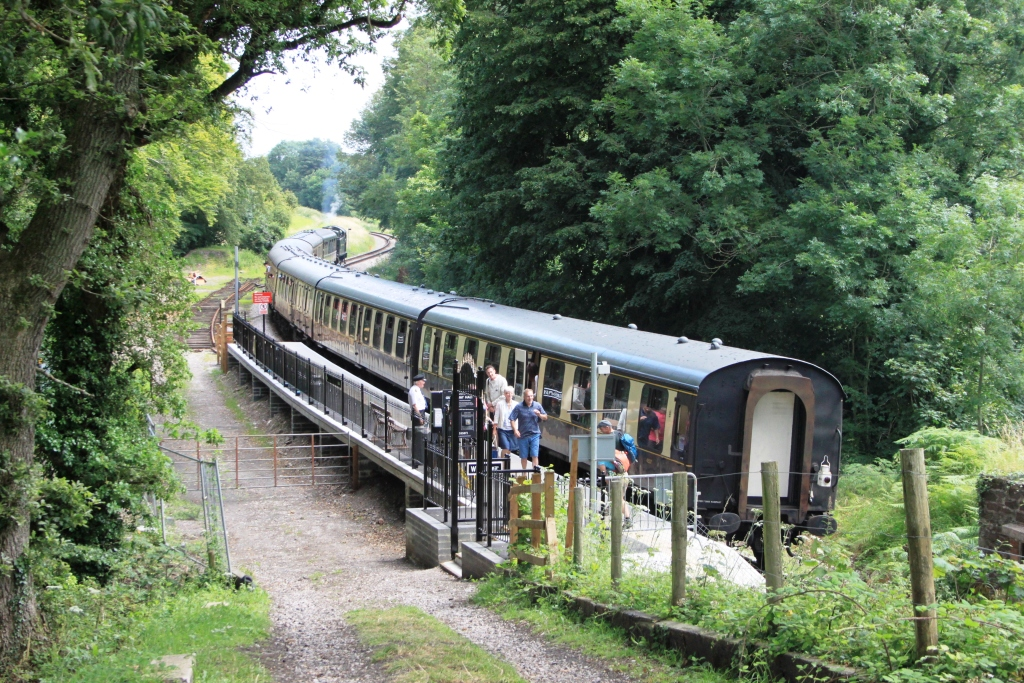

General information
- Location: Kingswear, South Hams; England
- Coordinates: 50.3863°N 3.5732°W
- Grid reference: SX882552
- System: Station on heritage railway
- Operator: Dartmouth Steam Railway
- Platforms: 1

Key dates
- 2012: Opened
- 2020: Services suspended
Location

Greenway Halt railway station is a small railway station on the Dartmouth Steam Railway, a heritage railway in Devon, England. It is situated near the northern end of the 495-yard (1,485-foot; 453-metre) long Greenway Tunnel and convenient for visitors to the Greenway Estate, the historic home of Agatha Christie.

== History ==
The railway to Kingswear was built by the Dartmouth and Torbay Railway and opened on 16 August 1864 but there was no station at Greenway. The original intention was that the line would continue towards the location of the Higher Ferry and a bridge built across the River Dart to Dartmouth but no agreement with land owners could be ascertained.

In 1972, British Rail proposed the closure of the line. It was instead sold to the Dart Valley Railway on 30 December 1972 and since then has been operated as a heritage railway. The railway is now promoted as the Dartmouth Steam Railway. In 2012 this new station was opened to attract visitors to the Greenway Estate, which was the home of crime writer Agatha Christie.

== Description ==
A short platform is situated on the west side of the line at Hook Bottom, a short distance from the north end of Greenway Tunnel. A path leads to the road that links Galmpton and Greenway.

== Services ==
A seasonal service of steam hauled trains operates between Paignton and Kingswear but none are currently scheduled to call at Greenway Halt.

Preceding station	Heritage railways	Following station
Inactive service
Kingswear Terminus	Dartmouth Steam Railway	Churston towards Paignton
