= Dart Valley Railway =

The Dart Valley Railway could refer to one of two heritage railways in Devon:

- The South Devon Railway (heritage railway), which was reopened by Dart Valley Light Railway plc in 1969, and taken over by South Devon Railway Trust in 1992.
- The Dartmouth Steam Railway, which Dart Valley Light Railway plc took over in 1972, and which the company (now called simply Dart Valley Railway plc) still runs.
