= Wheelskate =

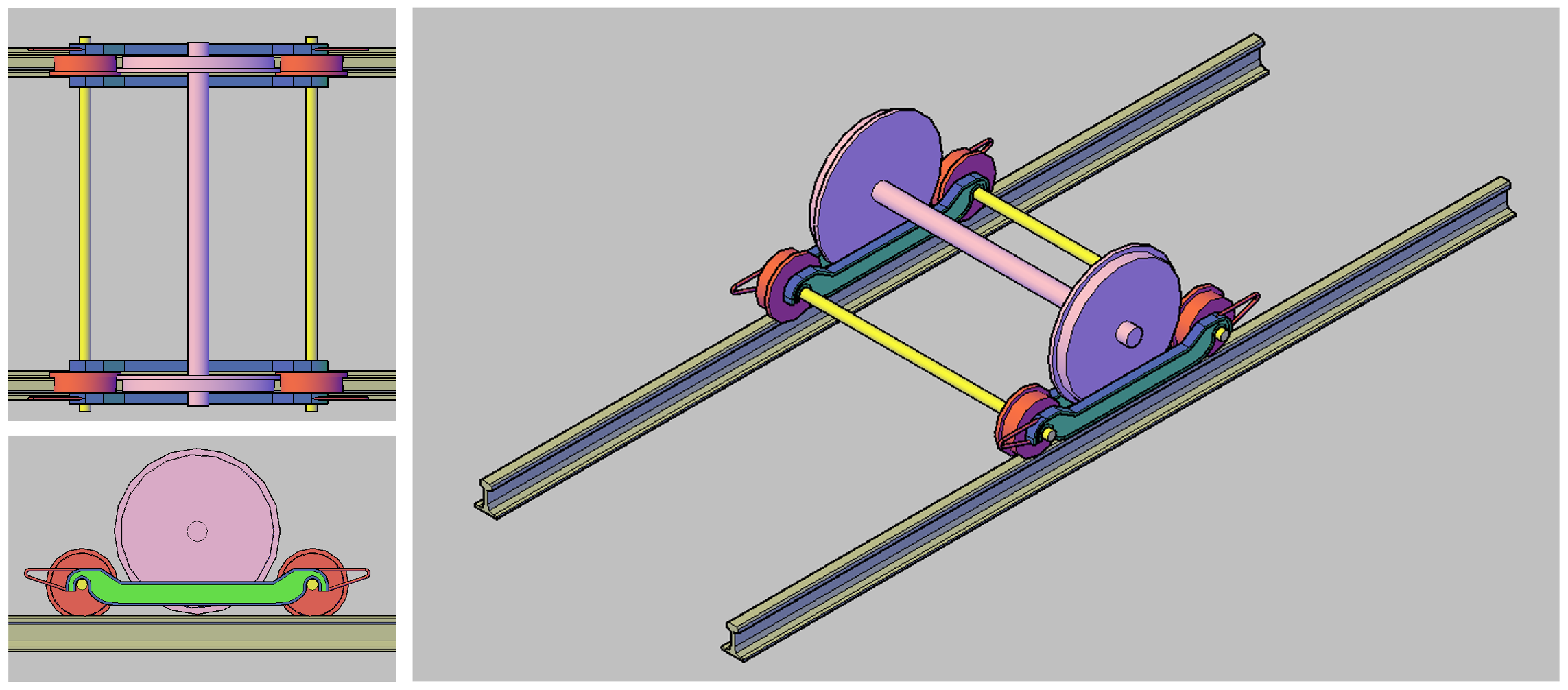
A rollerskate schematic from various perspectives

A wheelskate, wheel skate, or axle dolly is a device used to lift the axle of a damaged or blocked rail wheel set and prevent it sliding over the rail. With the axle lifted and wheels off the rails, the train can be moved for repairs.

To be able to use a wheelskate, access to one side of the vehicle is required. This is especially important for the design of tunnel cross-sections.

Wheelskates are used by a variety of railroads, both passenger and freight. They enable the continued operation of rail lines that would otherwise be brought to a halt by a breakdown.

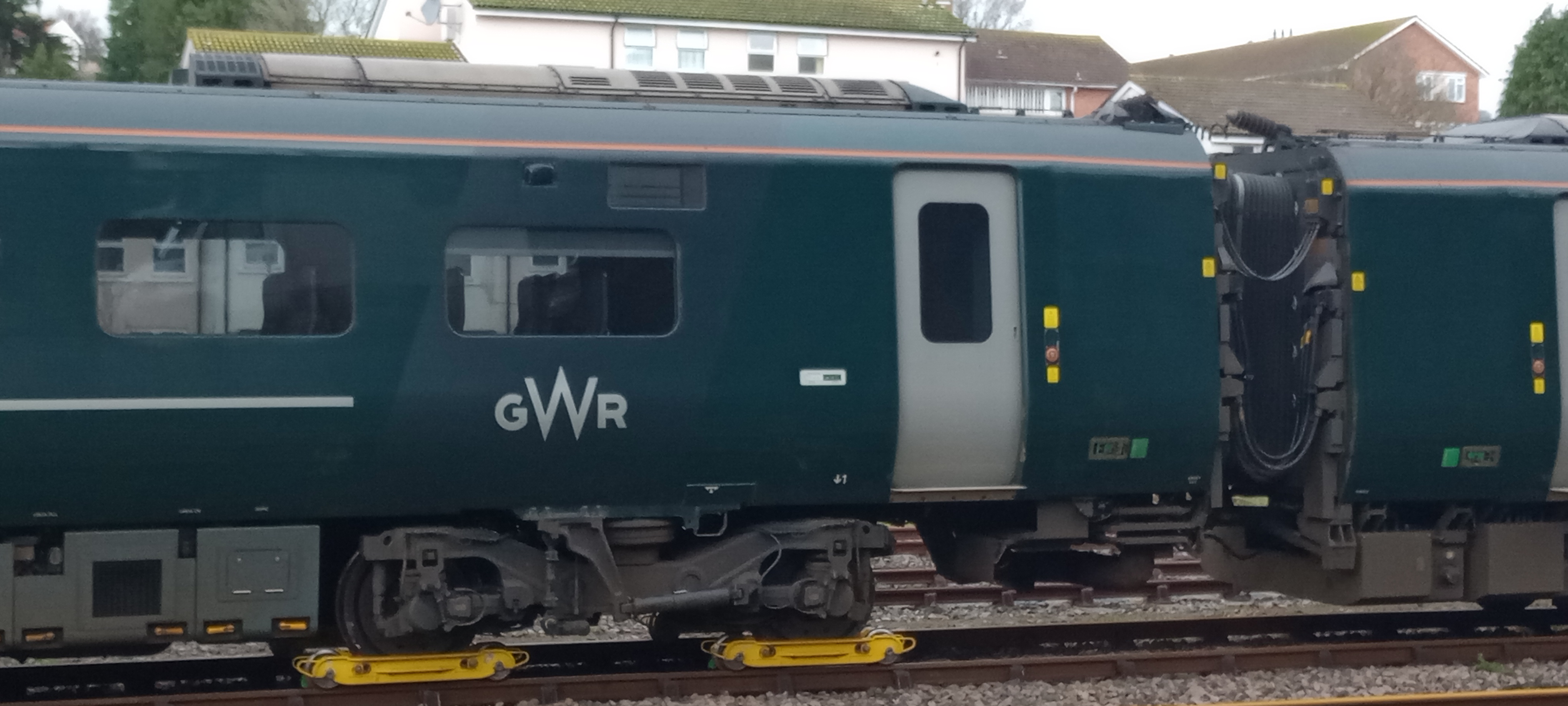
Wheelskates in use on British Rail Class 802 vehicle 837105 at Goodrington carriage holding sidings on 26 January 2026
