= Torbay and Brixham Railway =

19th century broad gauge railway in Devon, England

Overview
- Headquarters: Brixham
- Locale: England
- Dates of operation: 1868–1883
- Successor: Great Western Railway

Technical
- Track gauge: 7 ft (2,134 mm)
- Length: 2.07 miles (3.33 km)

The Torbay and Brixham Railway was a 7 ft (2,134 mm) broad gauge railway in England which linked the Dartmouth and Torbay Railway at Churston railway station, Devon with the important fishing port of Brixham. It was a little over two miles long. Never more than a local branch line, it closed in 1963.

== Construction ==
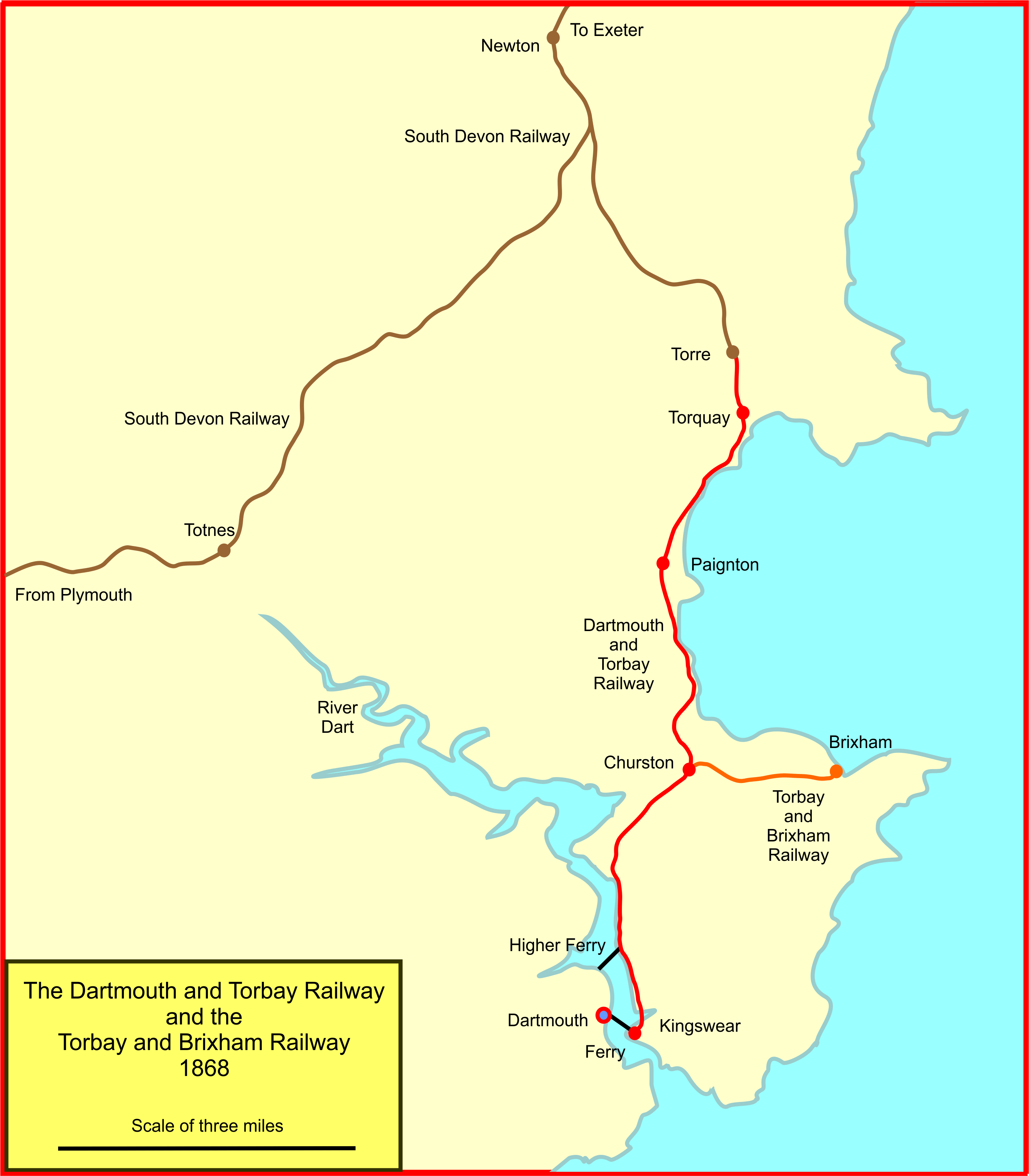
The Torbay & Brixham Railway and the Dartmouth & Torbay Railway in 1868

In the middle of the 19th century Brixham was an important fishing port, but as railways were constructed they were slow to reach the town. The South Devon Railway (SDR) opened its line to Newton Abbot—the station was called simply Newton at first—on 31 December 1846, and to a Torquay station—now renamed Torre—on 18 December 1848. It was some time before the line was extended, and it fell to a nominally independent company, the Dartmouth and Torbay Railway (D&TR) to build from Torre to Brixham Road station, later renamed Churston, opening to there on 1 April 1861. The station at Brixham was high above the town and two miles distant, and the D&TR was focused on reaching Dartmouth; in fact it settled for Kingswear, opening to there on 16 August 1864.

Torbay and Brixham Railway Act 1864
- Act of Parliament
- Parliament of the United Kingdom
- Long title: An Act for making a Railway from the Dartmouth and Torbay Railway at Brixham Road Station to Brixham in the County of Devon, and a Tramway in connexion therewith; and for other Purposes.
- Citation: 27 & 28 Vict. c. ccxlvii

Dates
- Royal assent: 25 July 1864

Text of statute as originally enacted

Seeing that the railway connection at "Brixham Road" was close, but inconvenient, a local solicitor and proprietor of the fishing harbour, Richard Walter Wolston, set about obtaining support for a line connecting Brixham itself. Largely by his efforts, the Torbay and Brixham Railway Company was incorporated by an act of Parliament, the Torbay and Brixham Railway Act 1864 (27 & 28 Vict. c. ccxlvii), on 25 July 1864 or 26 July 1864; together with a tramway in connection with the railway. The company's share capital was £18,000 and Wolston himself subscribed £17,700. The contractor defaulted during construction, but largely due to Wolston's personal and financial resources, it was completed, and opened on 28 February 1868 to passengers, goods traffic being handled from 1 May 1868. The line was 2m 6c (3.3 km) in length.

== Operation ==
Wolston obtained the small locomotive Queen second hand, but the line was worked by the South Devon Railway (SDR) at first. As well as passenger traffic, there was a dominant trade in fish. However Wolston was later in dispute with that company over the setting of commission for connecting traffic. Even though that issue was corrected, the T&BR taking over the operation itself for a time, the line ran at a financial loss. The SDR had amalgamated with the GWR and the Bristol and Exeter Railway in 1876—the combined company maintained the name Great Western Railway.

At this time the T&BR took over the operation of its line independently, and evidently the GWR was supportive in this, lending them a relief locomotive when Queen was out of service. In January 1877 the GWR sold another small engine, Raven, to the T&BR.

It proved impossible to sustain the independent existence of the T&BR, and a sale to the GWR was agreed on 19 May 1882, and authorised by the Great Western Railway (No. 2) Act 1882 (45 & 46 Vict. c. cxlviii); the sale took effect on 1 January 1883, for £12,000.

== Subsequent history of the line ==
Now simply a remote branch of the GWR, the line continued in use. Soon the West of England lines of the GWR were to be converted from the original broad gauge of 7 ft (2,134 mm) to what was now standard gauge, 4 ft 8 1/2 in (1,435 mm), and the Brixham branch was part of the process. It was carried out between 20 May 1892 and 23 May 1892.

The rise of road transport focussed the uneconomic nature of the branch, and it was closed to all traffic in 1963.

== Brixham station ==
The railway station had a single platform and a goods shed opposite. An engine shed and another small goods yard were situated at the Churston end of the station. It was constructed on the hill above the town in order that the gradients between Brixham and Churston were not too steep.

Brixham station became 'Roxham station' for The System, a 1964 film. An scene early in the film sees most of the main characters at the station, either arriving on a train hauled by a British Rail Class 22 locomotive or waiting there to see who is arriving in the town for a holiday.

== Locomotives ==
=== Queen ===
Queen
Type and origin
- Power type: Steam
- Builder: E. B. Wilson and Company
Specifications
- Configuration
  - Whyte: 0-4-0WT
- Gauge: 7 ft (2,134 mm)
- Driver dia.: 4 ft 0 in (1,219 mm)
- Wheelbase: 8 ft 0 in (2,438 mm)
- Cylinder size: 10 1/2 in (267 mm) dia × 17 in (432 mm) stroke

Queen was built in 1852 by E. B. Wilson and Company and was used for several years at the Isle of Portland in the construction of a breakwater for the harbour there.

Although the railway was initially worked by the South Devon Railway, the Torbay and Brixham Railway purchased this little locomotive to haul the trains. The South Devon Railway were to pay £3 per day for the facility, but the railway soon had to mortgage Queen to the South Devon for £350 to cover its debt to that company. In 1883 it passed to the Great Western Railway, which immediately withdrew it from service.

=== King ===
King
Type and origin
- Power type: Steam
- Builder: Avonside Engine Company
Specifications
- Configuration
  - Whyte: 2-4-0T
- Gauge: 7 ft (2,134 mm)
- Leading dia.: 2 ft 6 in (762 mm)
- Driver dia.: 3 ft 0 in (914 mm)
- Wheelbase: 9 ft 6 in (2,896 mm)
- Cylinder size: 9 in (229 mm) dia × 16 in (406 mm) stroke

A second locomotive was ordered by the Torbay and Brixham Railway for the South Devon Railway, but in fact the latter company paid for it and it worked in its fleet. See South Devon Railway 2-4-0 locomotives for further information.

=== Raven ===
Raven
Type and origin
- Power type: Steam
- Builder: Avonside Engine Company
Specifications
- Configuration
  - Whyte: 0-4-0ST
- Gauge: 7 ft (2,134 mm)
- Driver dia.: 3 ft 0 in (914 mm)
- Wheelbase: 7 ft 6 in (2,286 mm)
- Cylinder size: 14 in (356 mm) in dia × 17 in (432 mm) stroke

Raven had been built for the South Devon Railway as part of their Raven class for shunting dockside lines at Plymouth . In 1877, now also carrying their number 2175, it was sold by the Great Western Railway to the Torbay and Brixham to assist Queen.

=== Great Western locomotives ===
After 1883 the Great Western Railway provided various small locomotives from its fleet to operate the Brixham branch. Up until 1892 broad gauge locomotives employed were typically the ex-South Devon Railway 2-4-0 Prince and members of the GWR Hawthorn Class 2-4-0T type .

After the line was converted to standard gauge on 23 May 1892 a number of small tank locomotives, including the unique 4-4-0ST no. 13 were used on the line. In later years standard GWR 1400 Class 0-4-2Ts worked the autotrain. The final trains were worked by British Rail Class 122 single-car DMUs.

== Revival plans ==
The Association of Train Operating Companies in 2009 indicated that Brixham would benefit from a passenger railway service. The First Great Western service to Paignton would be extended to Churston station on the Paignton and Dartmouth Steam Railway, a heritage railway. Churston would serve as a railhead for Brixham, and also serve housing developments in the area since the opening of the steam railway; it might require the doubling of that line between Paignton and Goodrington Sands. However the study (Connecting Communities: Expanding Access to the Rail Network) did not indicate a source of funding, and despite showing a timeline of two years to implementation, at April 2014 no progress has been made.
