= Brixham railway station =

Former railway station in Devon, England

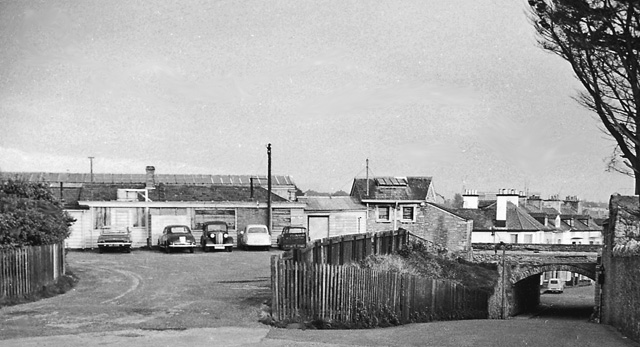
- The station in 1964, after closure

General information
- Location: Brixham, Torbay; England
- Coordinates: 50.3975°N 3.5148°W
- Grid reference: SX925564
- Platforms: 1

Other information
- Status: Disused

History
- Original company: Torbay and Brixham Railway
- Pre-grouping: Great Western Railway
- Post-grouping: Great Western Railway

Key dates
- 27 February 1868: Opened
- 13 May 1963: Closed
Location

Brixham railway station was a railway station on the Torbay and Brixham Line, serving the town of Brixham, in Devon. The station opened in 1868 and closed in 1963. The station was subsequently demolished and the site was developed as a housing estate.

== History ==
The Dartmouth and Torbay Railway Company opened a station (later called Churston station) beside Brixham Road on 14 March 1861. The press at the time reported that "the station is 2 miles from Brixham, rather an inconvenient distance in unfavourable weather". Proposals to the company to continue the line to Kingswear via Brixham were rejected unless the town would provide the money.

In August 1861 Richard Wolston made the proposition that a railway be built to "Furzeham Common, high above the town, so there would be no personal jealousy as to who should benefit most" to a public meeting.

The station was constructed to this proposal and it was formally opened in 1868.

The station closed on 13 May 1963 and the tracks were lifted during the following year.

== Popular culture ==
Brixham station was Roxham station' in The System, a 1964 film. An scene early in the film sees most of the main characters at the station, either arriving on a train hauled by a British Rail Class 22 locomotive or waiting there to see who is arriving in the town for a holiday.
