= Torquay railway station =

Railway station in Devon, England

Torquay
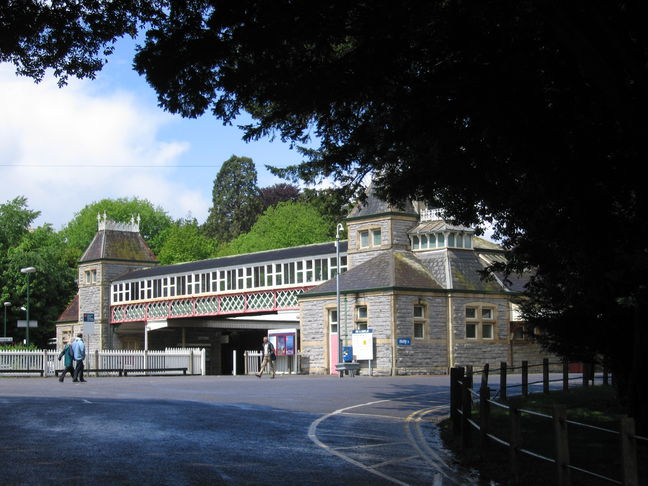

General information
- Location: Torquay, Devon, Torbay; England
- Coordinates: 50.46126°N 3.54310°W
- Grid reference: SX905635
- Managed by: Great Western Railway
- Platforms: 2

Other information
- Station code: TQY
- Classification: DfT category C2

History
- Original company: Dartmouth and Torbay Railway
- Pre-grouping: Great Western Railway
- Post-grouping: Great Western Railway

Key dates
- Opened: 1859
- Rebuilt: 1878

Passengers
- 2020/21: ▼0.169 million
- Interchange: ▼1,104
- 2021/22: ▲0.413 million
- Interchange: ▲3,312
- 2022/23: ▲0.455 million
- Interchange: ▲3,700
- 2023/24: ▲0.465 million
- Interchange: ▼1,265
- 2024/25: ▲0.508 million
- Interchange: ▼1,174

Listed Building – Grade II
- Feature: Torquay Station
- Designated: 26 March 1986
- Reference no.: 1206832
Location
Notes
- Passenger statistics from the Office of Rail and Road

Torquay railway station is on the Riviera Line and serves the seaside resort of Torquay, Devon, England. It is 219 miles 79 chains (354 km) from London Paddington (via Box).

The station is operated by Great Western Railway. It is just a few yards from the sea at Torre Abbey Sands.

== History ==
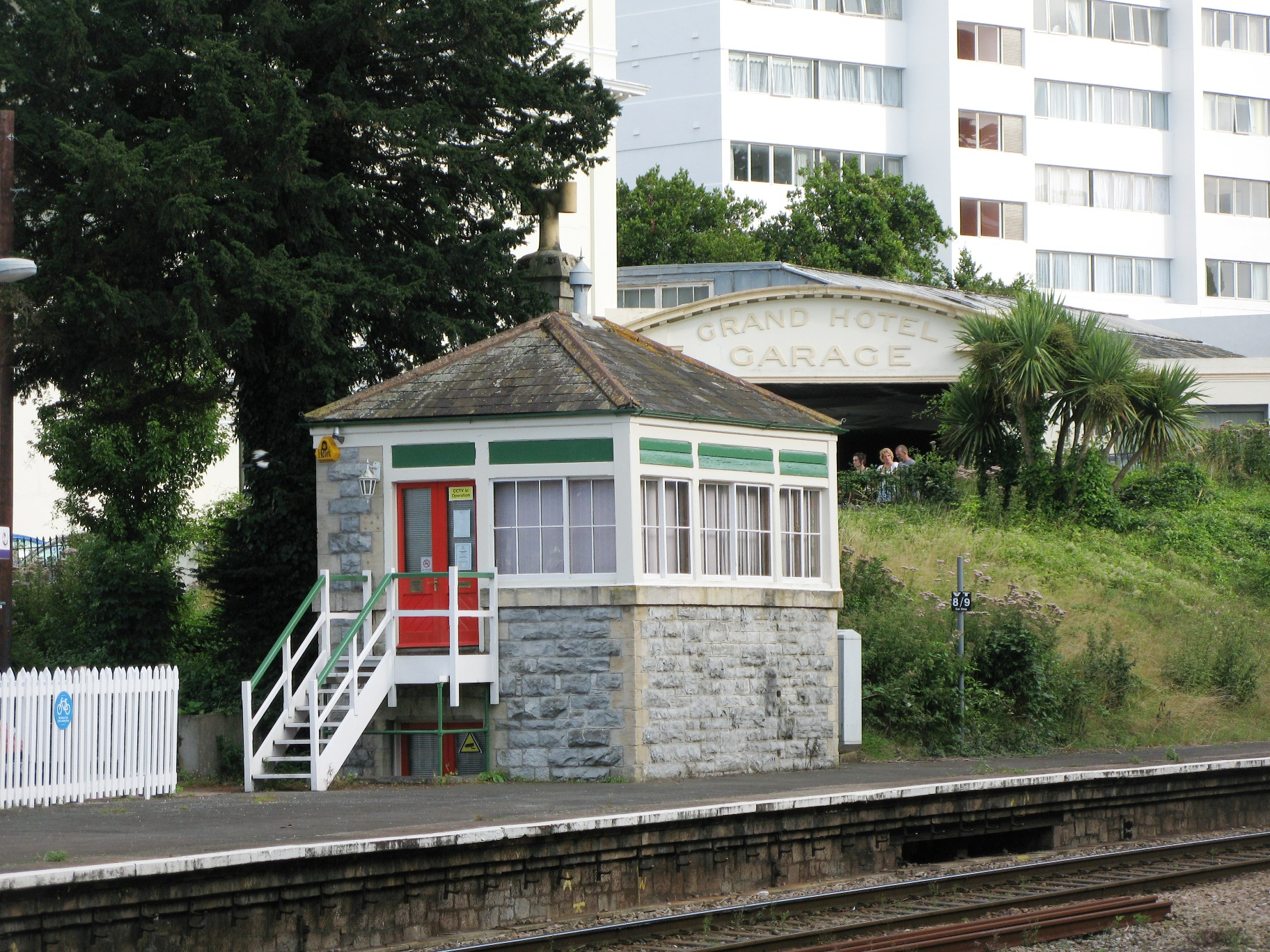
The South Signal Box built in 1878

A railway station serving Torquay had been opened by the 7 ft (2,134 mm) broad gauge South Devon Railway on 18 December 1848, but this station was on the hill distant from the harbour at the centre of the town. A new station near Abbey Sands was opened by the Dartmouth and Torbay Railway on 2 August 1859 when the original station was renamed "Torre". Goods traffic continued to be handled at the original station, the new one retaining a more genteel atmosphere with just passengers, their horse and carriages.

The Dartmouth and Torbay Railway was always operated by the South Devon Railway and was amalgamated with it on 1 January 1872. This was only short lived as the South Devon Railway was in turn amalgamated into the Great Western Railway on 1 February 1876. A vastly improved station by the architect and engineers William Lancaster Owen and J.E. Danks was opened on 1 September 1878 and the line, which had been a single track with a passing loop in the station, was doubled in 1882. A small signal box was opened at each end of the station in 1878, that at the Newton Abbot end has been demolished but the one at the Paignton end is now rented out as an office.

The line was converted to 4 ft 8 1/2 in (1,435 mm) standard gauge on 20 May 1892. The line towards Paignton was doubled on 30 October 1910, the work for which meant the opening out of the 133-yard (122 m) Livermead Tunnel which was at the top of the gradient south of the station. At around the same time the signalling was all concentrated in the South signal box, although the North box was retained as a ground frame to work points for sidings at this end of the station.

The Great Western Railway was nationalised into British Railways in 1948. The North ground frame was demolished in 1966 as the sidings had been taken out of use. The South signal box was closed on 1 November 1984, although it had only been opened on busy days since October 1968.

=== Torquay Gas Works ===
The local gas works were situated above the cliffs at Hollacombe, 1 mile (1.6 km) south of the station. During the Gas House Sidings' construction there was a potentially serious accident on 21 September 1866 when a train from Kingswear ran through an incomplete set of points and derailed.

In connection with the doubling of the line Torquay Gas House Signal Box was opened here on 24 July 1910. In addition to controlling the entrance to the gas works was used to increase the capacity of the line on busy days until 4 December 1966.

The siding saw very heavy traffic of coal brought up from the quay at Kingswear. When a ship arrived ninety empty wagons were sent to Kingswear and, as they were loaded, they were tripped up to the Gas House Siding. Depending on the locomotive type available that day, the loaded trains might be restricted to as few as 10 wagons due to the severe gradients on the line. Each ship provided up to 160 wagon loads.

=== Accidents and incidents ===
In common with most railways at the time, the early days saw many small accidents and incidents at Torquay. Two significant collisions occurred when trains descending the gradient from Torre ran onto the wrong line. On 15 April 1868 a goods train ran away and collided with an empty passenger train that was standing on the middle siding between the two platform tracks, knocking the train back more than 100 yards (91 m). The driver and fireman on the passenger train jumped off their locomotive when they saw the goods train coming towards them, but the driver fell under the train and was killed.

A similar problem happened on 16 August 1875 when a goods train failed to stop outside the station and ran into the main platform, which was occupied by a passenger train from Kingswear to Newton at the time. The driver was checking over his locomotive when he saw the train coming towards him, so he jumped back onto the footplate but immediately ran off onto the platform. His fireman had taken the brakes off and put the locomotive in gear to reverse it out of the way and, when he saw the driver come back onto the footplate, jumped off without realising that the driver did not stay on the footplate. The goods train now collided with the driverless passenger train, which was now slowly moving back the way it had come. It ran backwards up the gradient through Livermead Tunnel, gathered speed as dropped down through Paignton station, passing over the two level crossings and a third one at Tanners Lane, and then chugged up the gradient towards Churston. The guard had been left behind at Torquay, but two railway workers were on board and made their way along the footboards on the outside of the carriages, Robert Harley applying the brakes on each of the carriages while Edward Purcell made his way onto the locomotive to bring it to a stand. By the time they had done this the train was more than three miles from Torquay station. These two men were presented by the railway company with an inscribed silver watch and £25 each as a reward but the driver who ran away was dismissed and his fireman demoted.

On 25 August 1962, a busy holiday Saturday, a train hauled by British Rail Class 43 (Warship Class) No. D833 Panther, stalled while climbing the gradient from Torquay towards Paignton. Although it was protected by signals the following train, hauled by GWR 4900 Class 4932 Hatherton Hall, ran past these and collided with the rear of the stalled train.

== Description ==
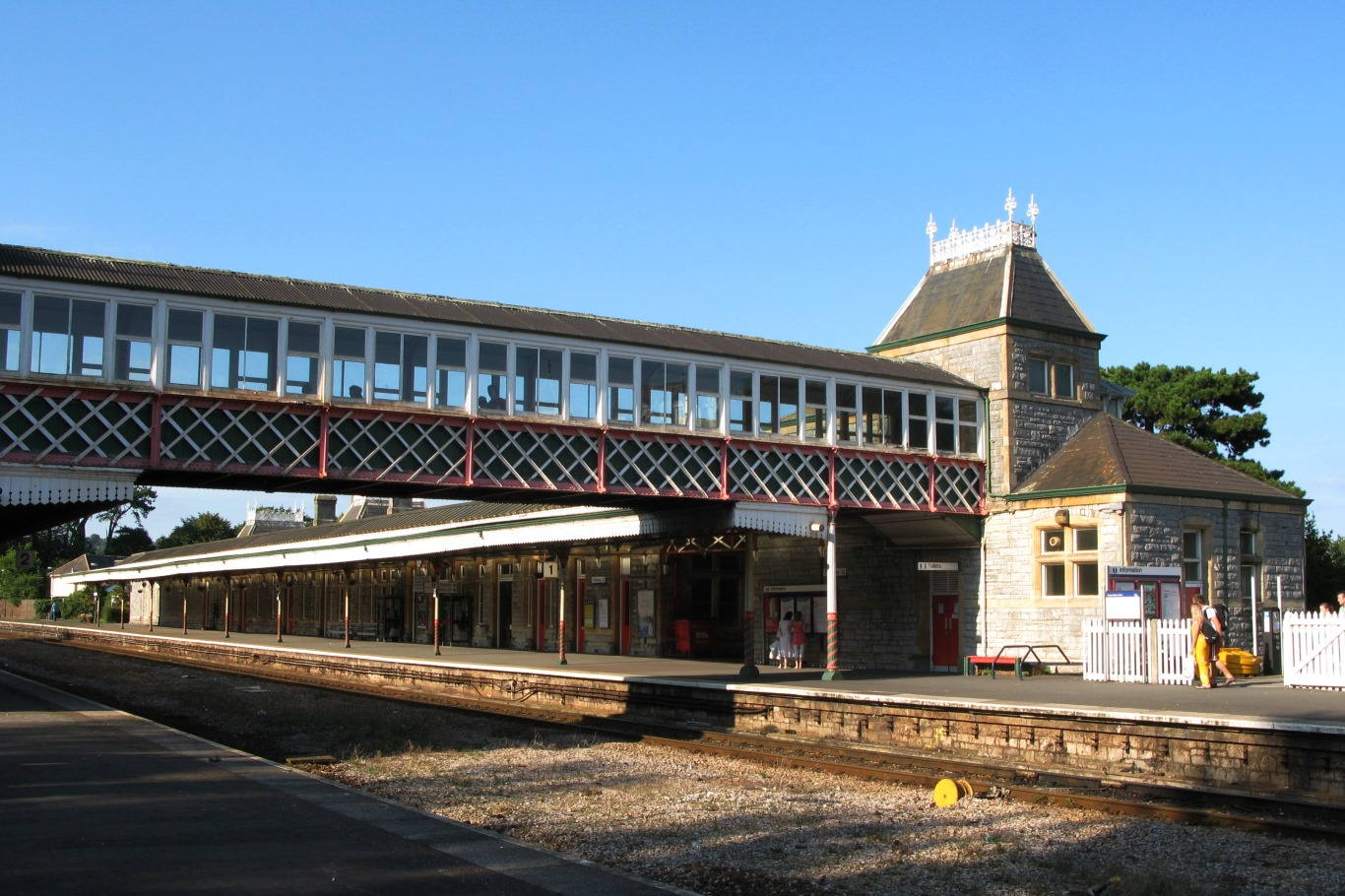
The footbridge at the south end of the main buildings.

The platform nearest the sea is served by trains towards Paignton, the opposite platform being used for trains towards Exeter St Davids. There is step-free access to both platforms and a wide footbridge links them.

The station has two ranges of buildings, each 244 feet (74 m) long, built in local grey rubble stone on either platform. Deep canopies on composite iron and wood girders cover the platforms; there are further canopies on the road side of both buildings. the building which faces the sea at Abbey Sands and the town is used and this houses the ticket office and a café; the gate from this approach road is open when trains are running. The one remaining signal box (now rented out for commercial purposes) is situated at the south end of this platform near a decorative cast iron bridge across the tracks. The station buildings are Grade II listed.

The forecourt in front of the main building is shaded by trees and is raised above the road by an arched retaining wall. The Grand Hotel is on the right of passengers leaving the station, and the sea front is just beyond. Buses to the harbour and town centre stop on the sea front by the road leading to the station.

== Services ==
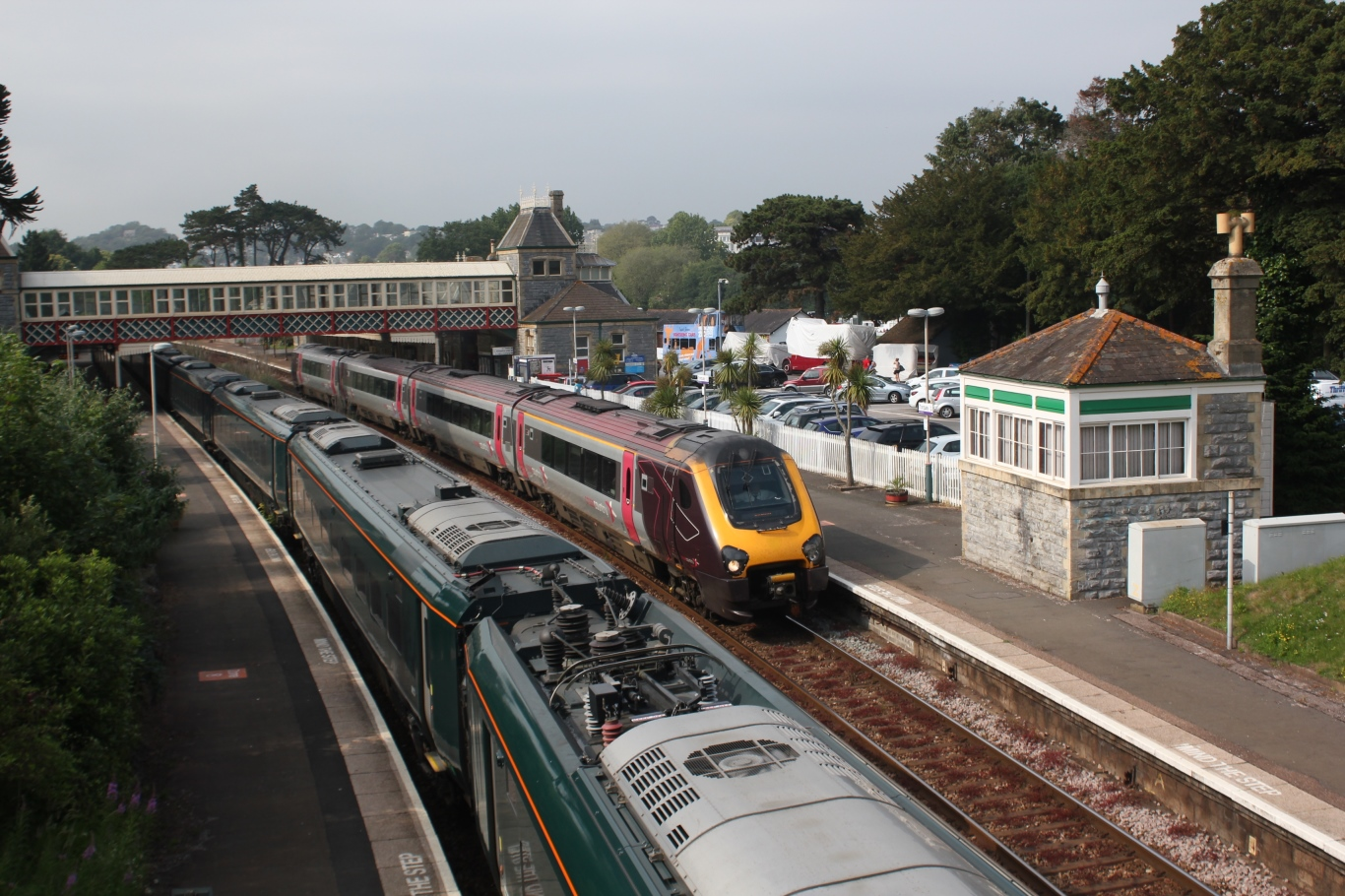
A Great Western Railway Class 800 going to London (left) and a CrossCountry Class 220 from Birmingham (right) pass at Torquay

Most services at Torquay are operated by Great Western Railway. A frequent service is provided along the Riviera Line between Paignton and Exeter St Davids, most of which continue on the Avocet Line through Exeter Central to and from Exmouth.

Great Western Railway also operates long-distance services to and from London Paddington and CrossCountry operate limited services to and from Bristol Temple Meads and Birmingham New Street. Passengers making long-distance journeys at other times change at Newton Abbot.

Preceding station	National Rail	Following station
Paignton Terminus	Great Western Railway Riviera Line	Torre towards Exeter St Davids
Paignton	CrossCountry	Newton Abbot

== Proposals ==
In the Torbay Council Mayoral Vision of 2007 it was proposed that this station is re-branded to become 'Torquay Seafront Station' and that Torre railway station be renamed 'Torquay Central Station'. This has not been done.

Torquay railway station secured planning permission from Torbay Council in 2021 for the installation of two lifts under the DfT's Access for All scheme.

== Bibliography ==
- Beck, Keith; Copsey, John (1990). The Great Western in South Devon. Didcot: Wild Swan Publication. ISBN 0-906867-90-8.
- Cooke, RA (1984). Track Layout Diagrams of the GWR and BR WR, Section 14: South Devon. Harwell: RA Cooke.

This station offers access to the South West Coast Path
Distance to path	100 yards (91 m)
Next station anticlockwise	Teignmouth 11 miles (18 km)
Next station clockwise	Paignton 3 miles (4.8 km)
