= Dartmouth railway station =

Railway station in Dartmouth, Devon, England

Coordinates: 50.3513°N 3.5773°W

Dartmouth
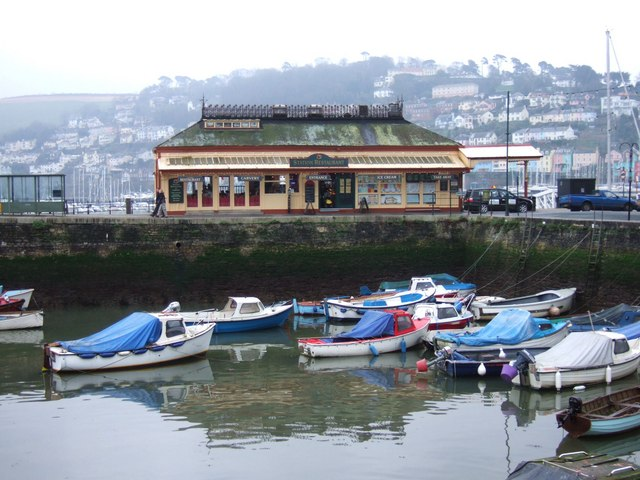

General information
- Location: Dartmouth, South Hams; England
- Platforms: 0

Other information
- Status: Disused (now a restaurant)

History
- Original company: Dartmouth and Torbay Railway
- Pre-grouping: Great Western Railway
- Post-grouping: Great Western Railway
Location

Dartmouth railway station was a booking office for train tickets located on the quayside of Dartmouth in the English county of Devon. While there has never been a railway line at the site, it was possible to book through tickets to and from Dartmouth via the office, accessing trains by travelling on Dartmouth Passenger Ferry to or from Kingswear railway station on the opposite bank of the River Dart. Accordingly, the office was classed as a "railway station" for ticketing purposes if purchasing an integrated ticket combining rail and ferry travel.

== History ==
The Dartmouth and Torbay Railway was frustrated in its efforts to build a line across the River Dart and so was forced to terminate its line on the east side of the river. A site near the floating bridge (a chain ferry also known as the Higher Ferry) to Dartmouth was preferred but the site was too narrow and so it was extended into Kingswear.

A site on the quay in Dartmouth was obtained and an 8-foot (2.4 m) wide jetty provided to accommodate a ferry from Kingswear. An 83-foot (25 m) long pier was built out from the quay, and a 60-foot (18 m) jetty linked this with a pontoon to which the ferry could moor. The jetty was hinged to the pier and so could rise and fall with the jetty as the tide went in and out. The pontoon was 58 feet (18 m) long and up to 18 feet (5.5 m) wide, and a hut was situated on it as a ticket office. The station opened with the railway on 16 August 1864.

The railway was leased to the South Devon Railway Company from 1 January 1866 and this in turn amalgamated with the Great Western Railway on 1 February 1876.

The town of Dartmouth instigated improvements to the waterfront in 1884, which saw a new embankment built north and south of the railway jetty, but the railway and town failed to agree on who was to pay to complete the new embankment at the site of the jetty and so a gap was left for five years. Eventually an agreement was reached and a new jetty provided. This was 13 feet 6 inches (4.11 metres) wide and 78 feet (24 metres) long, and connected to a new covered pontoon, 70 feet (21 m) by 30 feet (9.1 m). A new station building was provided on the shore, on the north side of the jetty. This wooden structure, which had full booking office and waiting facilities, was partially jettied out over the river on oak piles.

The station master at Dartmouth was paid more than his colleague at Kingswear due to the important traffic to HMS Britannia (as it was known then), the Royal Naval College, Dartmouth.

When the British Rail service from Paignton to Kingswear was withdrawn on 30 December 1972, the ferry to Dartmouth station was transferred to the Borough Council until 1974 when it was subsumed by South Hams District Council. The council subsequently sold the service to Dart Pleasure Craft whilst retaining ownership of the pontoon. The railway itself was immediately conveyed to the Dart Valley Railway company which was already operating the railway from Totnes to Buckfastleigh railway station, as a heritage railway. The station building was sold separately and became a restaurant, undergoing considerable modification. In 1986, when the Embankment was reconstructed and extended outward as part of a flood prevention scheme, the covered wooden pontoon was removed and replaced by a larger open concrete and steel pontoon. These works also involved encasing and infilling the station building's pilings.

In 2004 the Dart Valley Railway company bought Dart Pleasure Craft, thus bringing the ferry back into railway ownership.

== The site today ==
The Dartmouth Steam Railway, a heritage line, still runs trains from Paignton to Kingswear and operates a ferry across the River Dart, the combined Dart Valley Railway businesses trading as the Dartmouth Steam Railway and Riverboat Company. The ferry service uses the pontoon alongside the company's other boat services and those of the rival Greenway Ferry company. The station building is a restaurant, but railway and riverboat tickets are available from adjacent kiosks. The station environs also remain Dartmouth's bus terminus and taxi rank.

Preceding station	Heritage railways	Following station
Kingswear (via ferry)	Paignton and Dartmouth Steam Railway	Terminus

== See also ==
- Hull Victoria Pier railway station
