= Churston railway station =

Heritage railway station in Devon, England

Churston
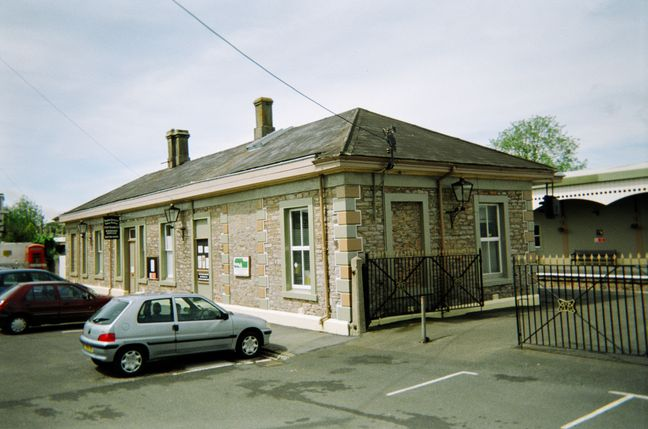

General information
- Location: Churston Ferrers, Torbay, Devon; England
- Coordinates: 50.39598°N 3.55677°W
- Grid reference: SX894562
- System: Station on heritage railway
- Operator: Paignton and Dartmouth Steam Railway
- Manager: South Devon Railway
- Platforms: 2

History
- Original company: Dartmouth and Torbay Railway
- Pre-grouping: Great Western Railway
- Post-grouping: Great Western Railway

Key dates
- 1861: Opened (as Brixham Road)
- 1868: Brixham branch opened
- 1972: Preserved
- 2020: Services suspended
Location

Churston railway station is on the Dartmouth Steam Railway, a heritage railway in Torbay, Devon, England. It is situated beside the main road to Brixham and close to the villages of Churston Ferrers and Galmpton. It is at milepost 225 measured from London Paddington via Box Tunnel.

It first opened as Brixham Road railway station in 1861 and was the junction for a branch line to Brixham from 1868 until 1963.

== History ==
=== Before preservation ===
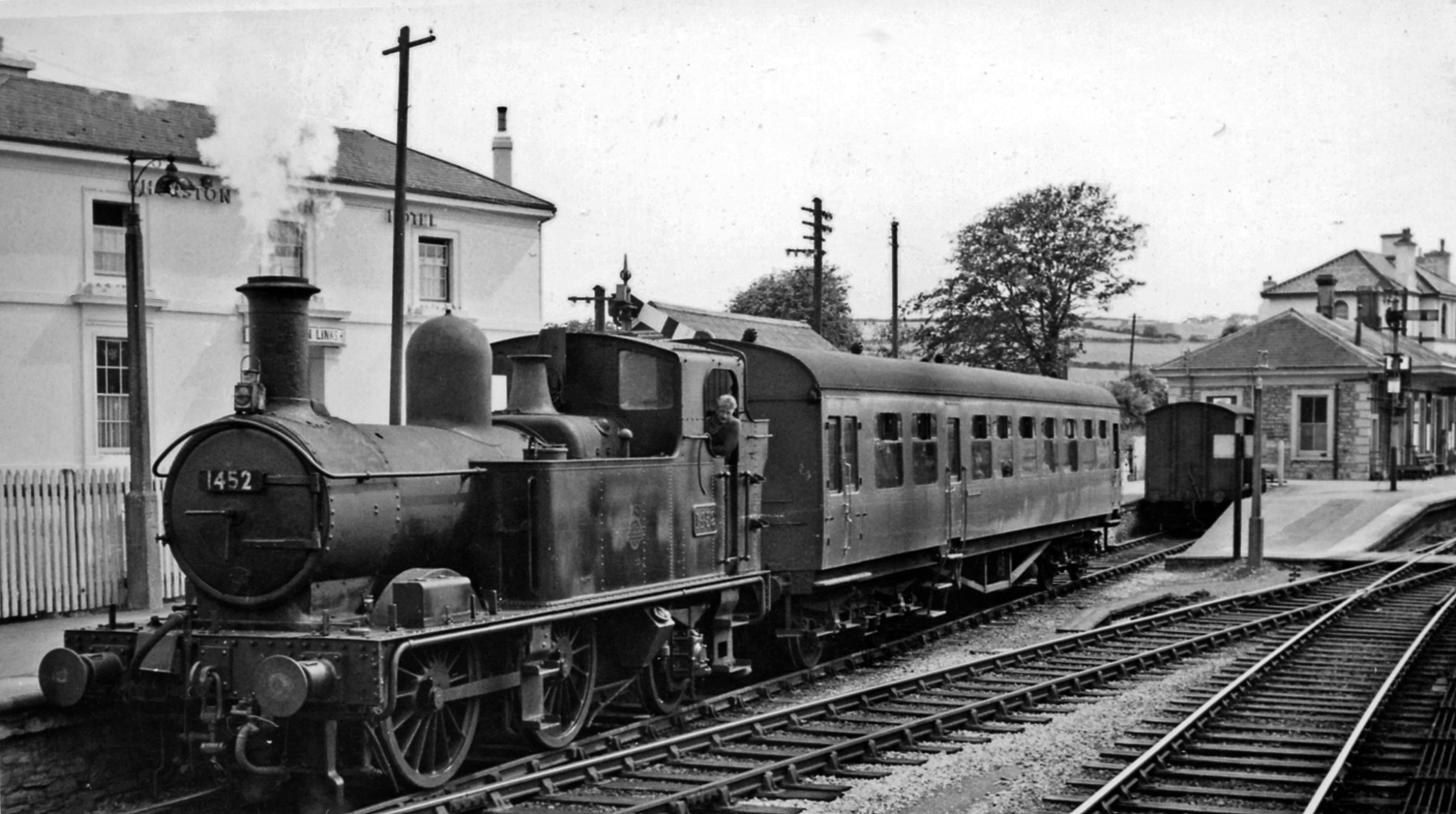
Auto-train for Brixham in 1958

The Dartmouth and Torbay Railway from Paignton railway station to Churston was opened for passengers on 14 March 1861 and for goods traffic on 1 April 1861. The station was known as 'Brixham Road' at the time, and the line was extended to Kingswear railway station on 16 August 1864. The initial single platform was supplemented by a second in 1865. The Dartmouth and Torbay Railway was always operated by the South Devon Railway Company and was amalgamated with it on 1 January 1872. This was only short lived as it was in turn amalgamated into the Great Western Railway on 1 February 1876.

In the meantime the station had changed its name to Churston when an independent branch line had been opened by the Torbay and Brixham Railway to serve the latter town on 28 February 1868. The station was now a junction but the goods shed had to be moved to a new site alongside the Brixham line to make room for a short bay platform to accommodate the Brixham trains. Sidings were added to allow for the goods traffic handled on the branch, including a busy trade in fish. The Torbay and Brixham Railway was taken over by the Great Western Railway on 1 January 1883.

The lines had been built using the 7 ft (2,134 mm) broad gauge, but on 21 May 1892 were closed for the weekend to be converted to 4 ft 8 1/2 in (1,435 mm) standard gauge. The following year saw the platforms lengthened and a new signal box constructed. The platforms were further lengthened and a new signal box opened on 9 February 1913 to control the now extended crossing loop.

The Great Western Railway was nationalised into British Railways on 1 January 1948. The Brixham branch closed on 13 May 1963, but the Kingswear service continued but Sunday trains no longer called at Churston after the 1967 summer season. General freight traffic was withdrawn on 14 June 1965 although coal was still handled until 4 December 1967. The crossing loop was taken out of use on 20 October 1968 and the signal box closed.

=== In preservation ===
The line was sold for £250,000 (equivalent to £2,960,900 in 2025) to the Dart Valley Light Railway plc on 30 December 1972, which operated another nearby railway at Buckfastleigh. Since then Churston has become an important centre for engineering on the railway.

The signal box was reopened in 1979 to control a new crossing loop, albeit with electric multiple-aspect signals, and the following year the former Brixham bay platform was relaid. In 1981 the turntable from Goodrington was moved to a position alongside the Brixham junction at Churston. The signal box was closed again in 1991 when control of the whole line was transferred to Britannia Crossing at Kingswear. A locomotive workshop was built behind the Up (towards Paignton) platform in 1993 and the station building restored and reopened. The Brixham bay platform was then covered by a carriage workshop in 1996.

== Description ==
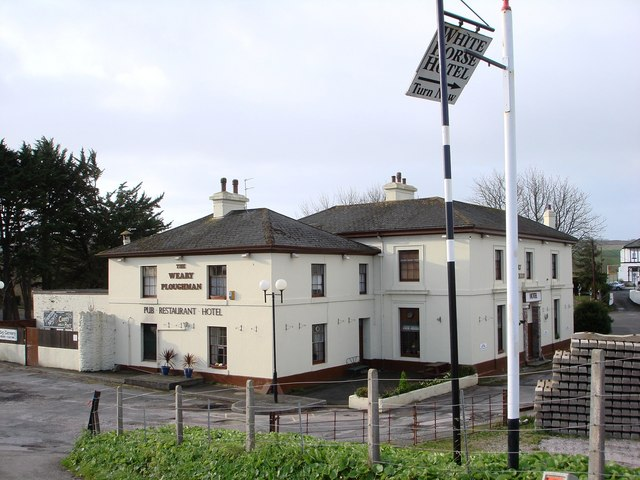
The former Railway Hotel

Churston is 225 miles 4 chains (362.2 km) from London Paddington and 2 mi 72 ch (4.7 km; 2.90 mi) from Paignton.

The main entrance is onto the platform mainly used by trains towards Kingswear. Signalling allows trains to use this in both directions but in practice trains towards Paignton depart from the opposite platform, which is reached by a footbridge. The station buildings are built of solid masonry with a large canopy integral with the roof. The local paper described them on the opening day "as unarchitectural as any Goth could wish".

Alongside the main platform, at the Paignton end, a modern workshop stands on the site of the platform once used by Brixham trains; this is the company’s paint shed. On the same side, beyond the modern bridge carrying the road to Brixham, are some sidings and the turntable. Opposite the paint shed, behind the Paignton platform, is another workshop which is used for heavy repairs to locomotives.

The former Railway Hotel is Grade II listed.

== Cultural references ==
Agatha Christie lived nearby, and set some stories in and around the area. Churston is the 'C' in The A.B.C. Murders.

Churston station was the location for the opening scene in The System, a 1964 film. Several of the main characters arrive at the last minute and jump onto a Diesel Multiple Unit that is just pulling out towards Kingswear. After the opening credits (mostly filmed at Dawlish) they then get off a train hauled by a Class 22 locomotive at Brixham.

The station appears in the 1939 colour film Sons of the Sea.

== Services ==
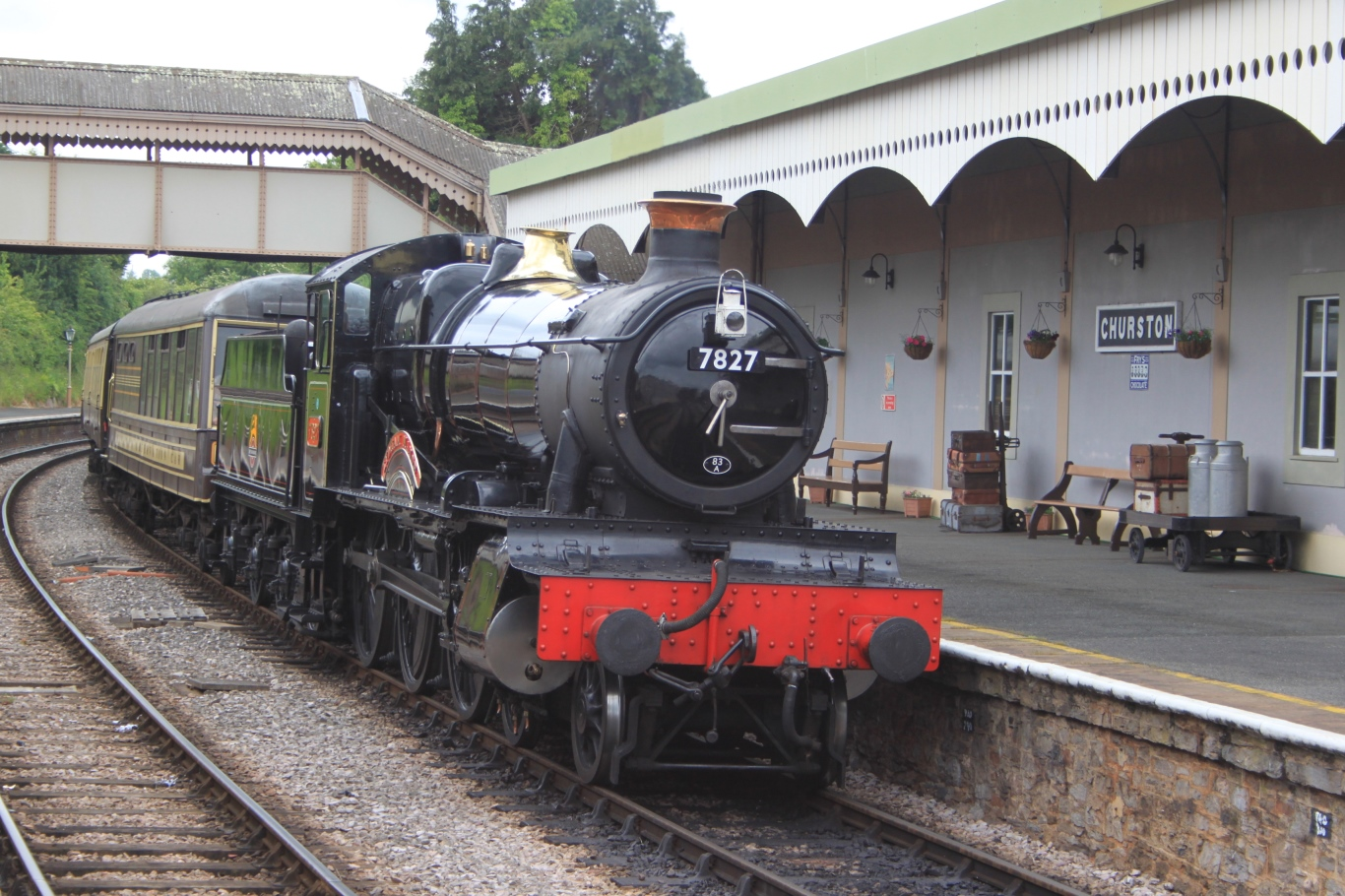
A train to Paignton in 2015

The 1861 timetable, when this was the terminus of the line from Newton, there were 6 arrivals and 7 departures on weekdays, and 4 arrivals and 5 departures on Sundays. In 1864, with the line open through to Kingswear, there were 9 in each direction on weekdays but just 2 on Sundays. Journey time to Kingswear was about 10 minutes, and to Newton took about 45 minutes By 1947 there were up to 20 Kingswear trains on weekdays and 6 on Sundays, while the Brixham branch connected with most of them but was closed on Sundays.

A seasonal service of steam hauled trains operates between Paignton and Kingswear but none are currently scheduled to call at Churston.

Preceding station	Heritage railways	Following station
Greenway Halt	Dartmouth Steam Railway (Service suspended)	Goodrington Sands
	Disused railways	
Terminus	Great Western Railway (Brixham branch line)	Brixham

== Future plans ==
The Association of Train Operating Companies included Brixham one of fourteen towns that, based on 2009 data, would benefit from a new railway service. This would be an extension of the then First Great Western service from Exmouth to Paignton on to Churston, which would then act as a railhead for Brixham. It would also serve other housing developments in the area since the opening of the steam railway, and may require the doubling of that line between Paignton and Goodrington Sands.

This station offers access to the South West Coast Path
Distance to path	0.5 miles (0.80 km)
Next station anticlockwise	Goodrington Sands 3 miles (5 km)
Next station clockwise	Kingswear 12 miles (19 km)
