= Goodrington carriage holding sidings =

Train stabling depot in Goodrington, Torbay

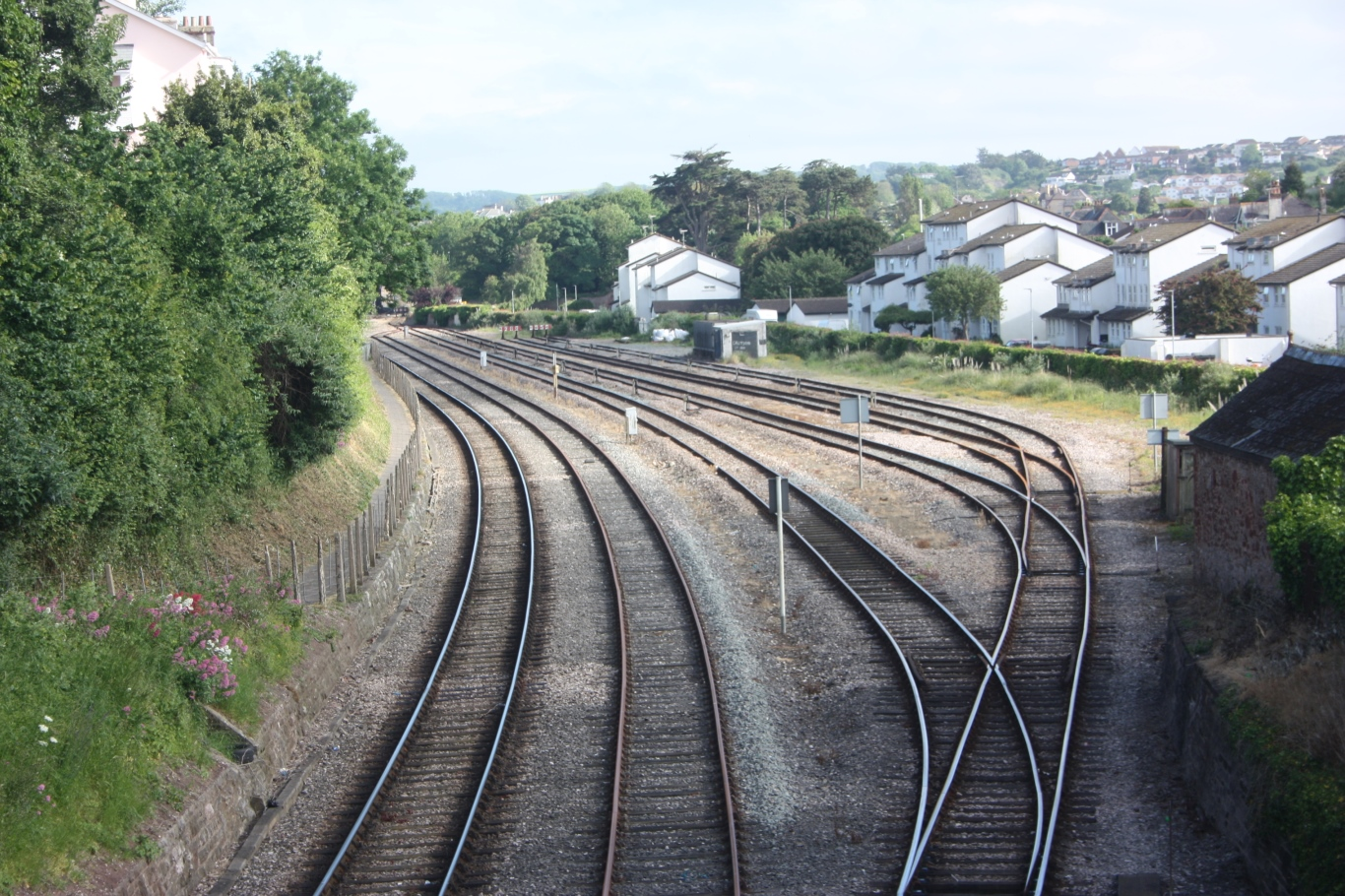
- Interactive map of Goodrington carriage holding sidings

Location
- Location: Goodrington, Torbay
- Coordinates: 50.4290°N 3.5645°W
- OS grid: SX88966000

Characteristics
- Owner: Network Rail
- Type: DMU, Diesel

History
- Opened: 1956

Goodrington carriage holding sidings are located in Goodrington, Torbay, England, and served from Paignton railway station.

== Train types ==
The sidings provide stabling for Great Western Railways British Rail Class 802 in between services to London Paddington station from Paignton railway station, and CrossCountry Class 220/221 Voyagers between services from Paignton railway station to Bristol Temple Meads railway station.
