= The System (1964 film) =

British drama by Michael Winner

- American theatrical release poster
- Directed by: Michael Winner
- Written by: Peter Draper
- Starring: Oliver Reed; Jane Merrow; Barbara Ferris; Julia Foster; Harry Andrews
- Cinematography: Nicolas Roeg
- Music by: Stanley Black
- Distributed by: Bryanston Films (UK)
- Release date: 11 October 1964 (UK)
- Running time: 93 minutes
- Country: United Kingdom
- Language: English

The System (American: The Girl-Getters) is a 1964 British drama film directed by Michael Winner and starring Oliver Reed, Jane Merrow and Barbara Ferris. The writer was Peter Draper, who in this film popularised the word 'grockle' to mean a holiday visitor.

The film was crucial in the careers of both director Michael Winner and star Oliver Reed.

Julie Christie was originally to play Nicola but was unavailable. The part went to Jane Merrow; it was her first major film.

== Synopsis ==
In the seaside town of Roxham, a group of local young men mingle among the seasonal tourists in search of sexual conquests. Near the end of one summer, the leader of the group, Tinker, a strolling photographer, aims to conquer a fashion model from a well-to-do family, but he finds himself unexpectedly falling in love. Tinker comes to think that maybe it is not just the tourists who are being used in these encounters.

== Cast ==
- Oliver Reed as Tinker
- Jane Merrow as Nicola
- Barbara Ferris as Suzy
- Julia Foster as Lorna
- Harry Andrews as Larsey
- Ann Lynn as Ella
- Guy Doleman as Philip
- Andrew Ray as Willy
- John Porter Davison as Grib
- Clive Colin Bowler as Sneakers
- Iain Gregory as Sammy
- David Hemmings as David
- John Alderton as Nidge
- Jeremy Burnham as Ivor
- Mark Burns as Michael
- Derek Nimmo as James
- Derek Newark as Alfred
- Talitha Getty as Helga
- Victor Brooks as Club Manager
- Pauline Munro as Sylvie

== Production ==
Extensive location filming took place in south Devon including Brixham railway station (now demolished), Brixham Harbour, Elberry Cove, Paignton Beach, Harbour, and Pier, Torquay Palm Court hotel (now demolished), and Torquay seafront. Dartmouth, the Dartmouth ferry, Slapton Sands, and Hallsands also featured.

Julie Christie was intended to be in the film, but she had to withdraw and was replaced by Jane Merrow.

== Critical reception ==
The Monthly Film Bulletin wrote: "Peter Draper's script contains some penetrating comments on the phenomenon of the English seaside resort, and the reputation English girls have for breaking out of their tight moral shells and turning into amoral chicks when on holiday. There is an episode, for instance, backed by pungent commentary, when the camera rakes over the beach: image on image piles up of human beings, lumpy and vulgar, packed tight together facing an empty ocean. But the mildly promising theme is pushed aside as the tired, overworked tale of lower-class boy chasing upper-class girl takes over. "The result is a strange dichotomy of place and action, in which the vulgar beach on the one hand, and the other, craggy and lonely, where Tinker woos his Nicola, could well be on opposite sides of the moon. Oliver Reed, moreover, is badly cast as Tinker. In a very class-conscious film his accent places him firmly in the "U" category, while the script puts him several pegs lower: this plays havoc with the action, and we can never really believe in, let alone feel sympathy for, this rather unattractive Don Juan of the beaches. The direction sacrifices credibility for ostentatious images – witness the shot in which Tinker appears on the cliff, a masculine virility symbol, the sun streaming between his legs, or the Fellini-like bonfire party on the beach. Both are cinematic padding, but the photography in general is sharp, clear, and sometimes beautiful."

Leslie Halliwell said: "Adequate sexy showcase for some looming talents; all very unattractive, but smoothly directed in a number of imitated styles."

The Radio Times Guide to Films gave the film 3/5 stars, writing: "Once upon a time, teenage boys used to go to the unromantic English seaside to pick up their girls, before cheap air travel to the Costa Brava was introduced. This quaint period romp provides a mirror of those not-so-innocent times, elegantly photographed in black-and-white by cinematographer Nicolas Roeg and oozing early 1960s charm from Peter Draper's clever screenplay. The young, talented cast is headed by Oliver Reed, Jane Merrow, Barbara Ferris and Julia Foster, and watch closely for director Michael Winner in shot on the platform as the train arrives at Torquay."
