= Dartmouth Steam Railway =

Heritage railway line in Devon, England

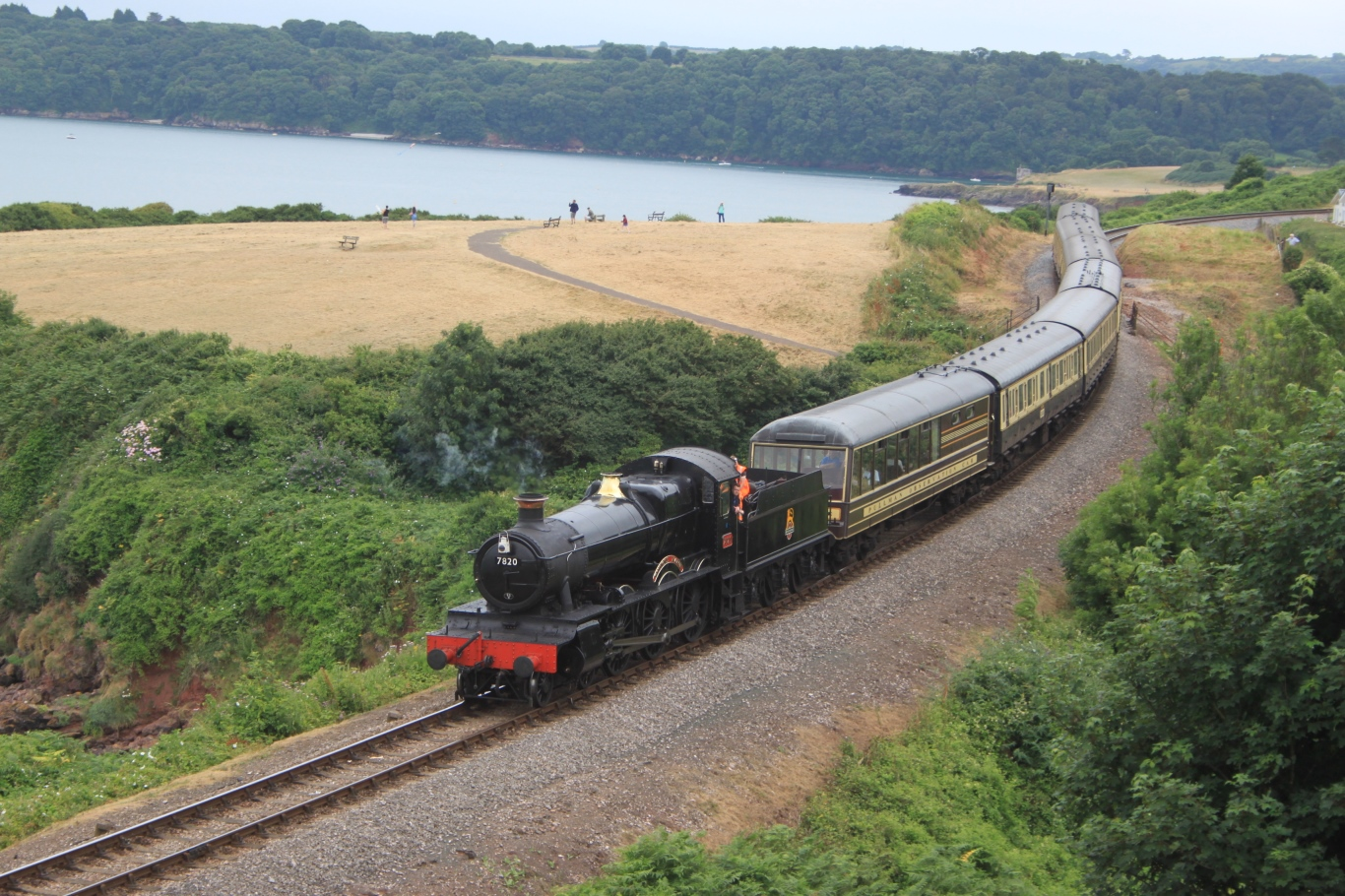
- Locale: Paignton, Devon, England
- Terminus: Kingswear

Commercial operations
- Name: Kingswear branch
- Built by: Dartmouth and Torbay Railway
- Original gauge: 7 ft 1/4 in (2,140 mm) Brunel gauge until 1892

Preserved operations
- Operated by: Dart Valley Railway Limited
- Stations: 5
- Length: 6.7 miles (10.8 km)
- Preserved gauge: 4 ft 8 1/2 in (1,435 mm) standard gauge

Commercial history
- Opened: 1859
- 10 August 1864: Line completed
- 21 May 1892: Converted to 4 ft 8 1/2 in (1,435 mm) standard gauge
- Closed: 28 October 1972

Preservation history
- 30 December 1972: Sold to Dart Valley Railway
- 1981: Turntable moved to Churston
- 2011: Heritage Festival marking 150 years of the line reaching Churston
- 2012: Greenway Halt opens to the Public
- 2012: New station building at Paignton opens
- Headquarters: Paignton

Website
- www.dartmouthrailriver.co.uk

The Dartmouth Steam Railway, formerly known as the Paignton and Dartmouth Steam Railway, is a 6.7-mile (10.8 km) heritage railway on the former Great Western Railway branch line between Paignton and Kingswear in Devon, England. Much of the railway's business is from summer tourists from the resorts of Torbay, who travel to Kingswear, where the Dartmouth Passenger Ferry takes them across the River Dart to Dartmouth.

The line is owned and operated by Dart Valley Railway Limited. This company also owns Dart Pleasure Craft Limited, which operates the Dartmouth Passenger Ferry as well as river and coastal cruises. The railway and connecting boat and bus services are jointly promoted as the Dartmouth Steam Railway and River Boat Company.

Unusually amongst heritage railways, it is a commercial operation which does not rely on volunteer labour or charitable donations, although a few volunteers help at Churston railway station.

== History ==
=== Kingswear branch ===
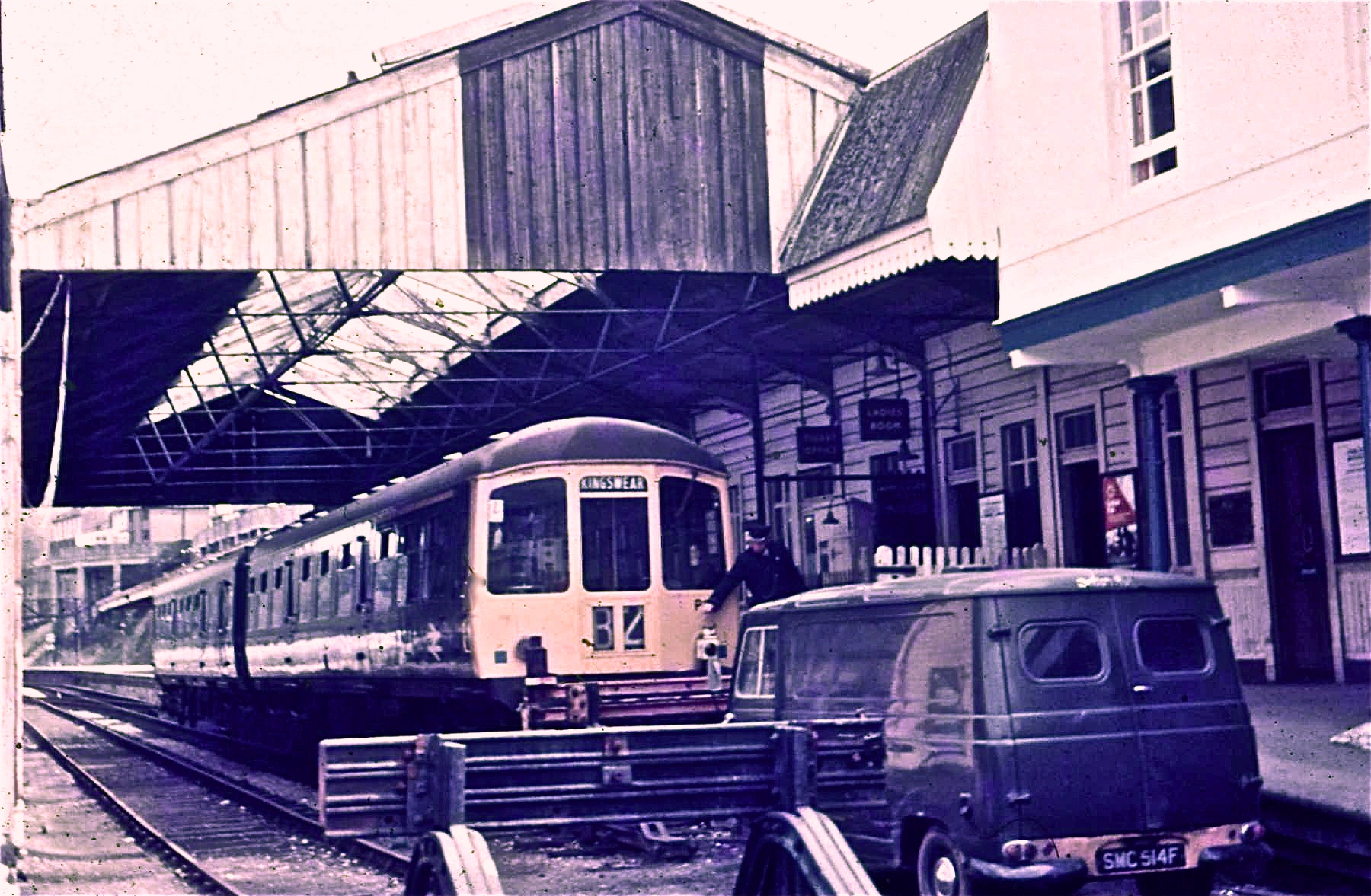
A British Rail Class 103 at Kingswear in 1972

The line was built by the Dartmouth and Torbay Railway, opening to Brixham Road station on 14 March 1861 and on to Kingswear on 10 August 1864. The Dartmouth and Torbay Railway was always operated by the South Devon Railway and was amalgamated with it on 1 January 1872. This was only short-lived as the South Devon Railway was in turn amalgamated into the Great Western Railway on 1 February 1876. Brixham Road became a junction and was renamed "Churston" on 1 January 1868 when the independent Torbay and Brixham Railway opened its short line. There were level crossings at Sands Road, Paignton, Tanners Road, Goodrington and on the approach to the Dartmouth Higher Ferry.

A new halt, less than one coach long, was opened on 18 October 1877 at the level crossing leading to the Dartmouth Higher Ferry, named Kingswear Crossing Halt, or later, Britannia Halt, for the Prince of Wales to bring his sons to enter the naval college based on HMS Britannia, which was moored close by on the river. In later years, the halt was used mainly by workers travelling to the Philip and Sons shipyard at Noss. In Heritage Railway times, the cost of maintenance could not be justified, and it was demolished.

The line was single-track except for a crossing loop at Churston. It had been built using the 7 ft (2,134 mm) broad gauge, but on 21 May 1892 was converted to 4 ft 8 1/2 in (1,435 mm) standard gauge. There were masonry viaducts at Broadsands, Hookhills and Greenway. South of Greenway Tunnel the railway was originally carried across two creeks on low timber viaducts, that at Longwood being 200 yards (183 m) long and Noss being 170 yards (155 m). These were demolished after the line was moved inland around the creeks on 20 May 1923. This also allowed the expansion of the Philip and Son shipyard between the creeks, to which a siding was opened in 1929. Authorisation was given by the GWR board to double the line from Greenway Viaduct to Britannia Halt, and the deviation was built to double track width, but the doubling was never undertaken. There was a further timber viaduct at Waterhead Creek, Kingswear, which was replaced by a double track concrete and steel viaduct in 1928, after which the heaviest locomotives could be used on the whole line. A turntable and an engine shed were provided at Kingswear. The shed was demolished in 1929, when the platform was extended to its present length of 850 ft (260 m).

A station was opened at Goodrington Sands, south of Paignton, on 9 July 1928. Approval was also given for a second halt at Broadsands, and there has been considerable debate as to whether it was actually built. C.R. Potts seems to have settled this with new evidence to show that it was not built. Park Sidings opened alongside Paignton Station in 1930 to give more room to stable carriages. A goods depot opened south of the station the following year, and the running line was doubled as far as Goodrington Sands.

The Great Western Railway was nationalised into British Railways on 1 January 1948. Further carriage sidings to handle the heavy traffic on summer Saturdays were opened at Goodrington in 1956, when the road bridge on Tanners Road, started before the Second World War, was completed and the level crossing abolished. A turntable was brought into use there in the following year.

The Reshaping of British Railways report (the "Beeching Report") was published by the British Railways Board in 1963. It included the results of a survey which listed stations in three categories by annual income: Red (up to £5000); Blue (£5000 to £25000); and Green: (over £25000). Paignton was in the Green category, with Goodrington Sands, Churston, Kingswear and Dartmouth stations all in the Blue category. Brixham was in the Red category. As a result, the line was not proposed for closure, although it was shown as being subject to "modification".

Except in peak season, most train services from 18 April 1966 operated as a shuttle service from Paignton; Sunday trains were withdrawn from 24 September 1967, although some were run during the summer of the following year. The Brixham branch closed on 13 May 1963 and the crossing loop at Churston was closed on 20 October 1968.

=== Heritage railway ===
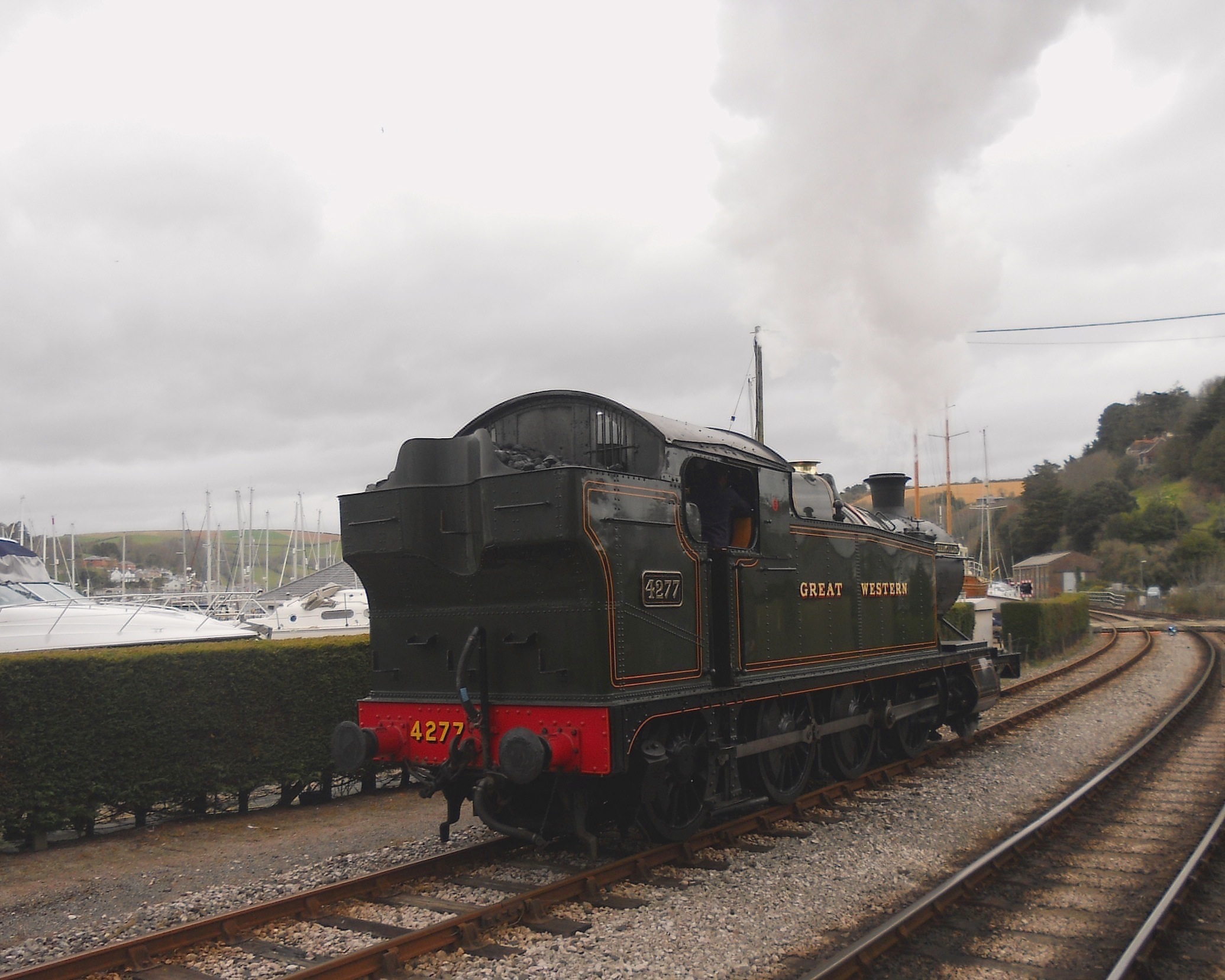
Regular steam locomotive GWR 2-8-0T Class 42xx No. 4277 'Hercules' runs round the train at Kingswear

In 1968 it was formally proposed to the Ministry of Transport that the line from Paignton should be closed entirely, with costs given as £54,500 and income as £17,100 exclusive of income from arriving passengers. However, a letter from the Divisional Manager at Bristol to the Regional Headquarters at Paddington on 11 December 1968 gave the contributory revenue as £54,000, so showing a profit of £16,600. The Transport Users Consultative Committee approved the closure subject to suitable replacement bus services being available, but the closure was not proceeded with at that point. During 1971/2, talks were conducted between British Rail Western Region and Dart Valley Light Railway Ltd. about the possibility of a sale from the former to the latter. BR gave the losses as £47,000, although there was still no allowance for contributory revenue. The line was officially closed on 28 October 1972, but BR ran a diesel multiple unit service on behalf of DVLR, subsidised by Devon County Council.

On 30 December 1972, the line was sold to the Dart Valley Light Railway Ltd, which at that time operated the nearby heritage railway that subsequently became the South Devon Railway. A winter service was operated from 1 January 1973, principally for the children at Churston Grammar School. There were two early morning services and two afternoon services. These were soon supplemented by a midday service each way, as the locomotive and stock were otherwise unemployed, but from the end of that summer it became a purely seasonal operation. The purchase price of the railway was £250,000 and a further £25,000 was paid for signalling alterations at Paignton. Most of this was recouped from the sale of surplus land, mainly at Goodrington, which was subsequently developed as flats, and at Kingswear, which became a marina. The Royal Dart Hotel at Kingswear was sold later. British Rail retained ownership of the line from south of Queen's Park station to a point adjacent to the end of the sidings at Goodrington, including the station, which was operated under a running powers agreement, and which was acquired by the DVR Company in 2000. A short section at and just south of the Sands Road level crossing at Paignton remains the property of Network Rail.

An independent station alongside the main station at Paignton, known as "Queens Park", was opened to serve the Kingswear trains on the site of the old Park Sidings. The line was initially marketed as the "Torbay Steam Railway", but this was changed to the "Torbay and Dartmouth Railway", then to the "Paignton and Dartmouth Steam Railway" and then to the "Dartmouth Steam Railway", part of the overall "Dartmouth Steam Railway and Riverboat Company" title. It remains the property of The Dart Valley Railway Limited (the "Light" having been dropped in 1999, and ceasing to be a plc in 2018).

The loop was reinstated at Churston in 1979 using colour-light signals, controlled by a new signal box on the original site, and made possible an hourly service in the peak season. On Saturdays, there were many passengers for holiday camps in the Brixham area, and three trains were run between Paignton and Churston only. In 1981 the turntable from the British Rail sidings at Goodrington was moved to Churston, to the north of the station, aligned on the old Brixham branch. In 1991 the control of all signalling was moved to a new panel at Britannia Crossing near Kingswear. A locomotive workshop was opened at Churston in 1993 and a carriage shop opened there three years later. A new level crossing just to the north of Kingswear to serve the Darthaven Marina, controlled from the Britannia signal box with the aid of closed-circuit television, was opened on 24 January 1993.

In 2007 the passing loop at Goodrington Sands was reinstated, along with the carriage sidings to give more space for storing rolling stock. In 2011 new offices for the railway and boats were opened at Kingswear in the style of a large GWR-style signal box. The following year saw the Dartmouth Steam Railway's station at Paignton rebuilt in GWR style, and a new unstaffed station opened at Greenway Halt to serve Agatha Christie's Greenway Estate. This is a request stop. Goodrington Sands became a request stop for the winter timetable only in 2016, but remains a compulsory stop at other times.

== Ownership ==
The Dart Valley Railway Company Ltd was formed initially to purchase the trackbed and station sites of the Totnes to Ashburton line, which is now known as the South Devon Railway. On 30 December 1972, the Paignton to Dartmouth line was also sold to the Dart Valley Railway Company Ltd by the Ministry of Transport.

The South Devon Railway Trust bought the freehold of the Totnes to Ashburton line from the Dart Valley Railway plc on 8 February 2010. Until 2016, a Channel Islands-based businessman was the major shareholder in the plc company, until he sold his entire 29.99% share holding to businessman and steam railway enthusiast, Jeremy Hosking. The company ceased to be a plc on 29 November 2018.

== Operation ==
The operational base is at Paignton where an engine shed is situated. Heavy overhauls of locomotives are undertaken at Churston where there is a locomotive workshop on the west side of the line, and a paint shop and turntable on the east side.

When the heritage railway took over there was just a single track so "one engine in steam" operation was used. In July 1979 a loop and signal box with electric multiple-aspect signals were brought into use at Churston. This allowed two trains to operate on busy days. The section from Churston to Kingswear remained "one engine in steam" but from Churston to Paignton was operated by "staff and ticket" until "electric token working" was implemented in 1980. The signal box was replaced by one at Britannia Crossing in 1991.

== Route ==
Point	Coordinates (Links to map resources)	OS Grid Ref	Notes
Paignton	50.435°N 3.565°W	SX88956063	
Goodrington Sands	50.4251°N 3.5622°W	SX89125952	
Churston	50.3960°N 3.5568°W	SX89445628	
Greenway Halt	50.3863°N 3.5732°W	SX88255522	
Kingswear	50.3488°N 3.5725°W	SX88215105	
Dartmouth	50.3513°N 3.5773°W	SX87885134	Reached by ferry

The route is described facing forwards from Paignton to Kingswear, which puts the sea on the left and the River Dart on the right.

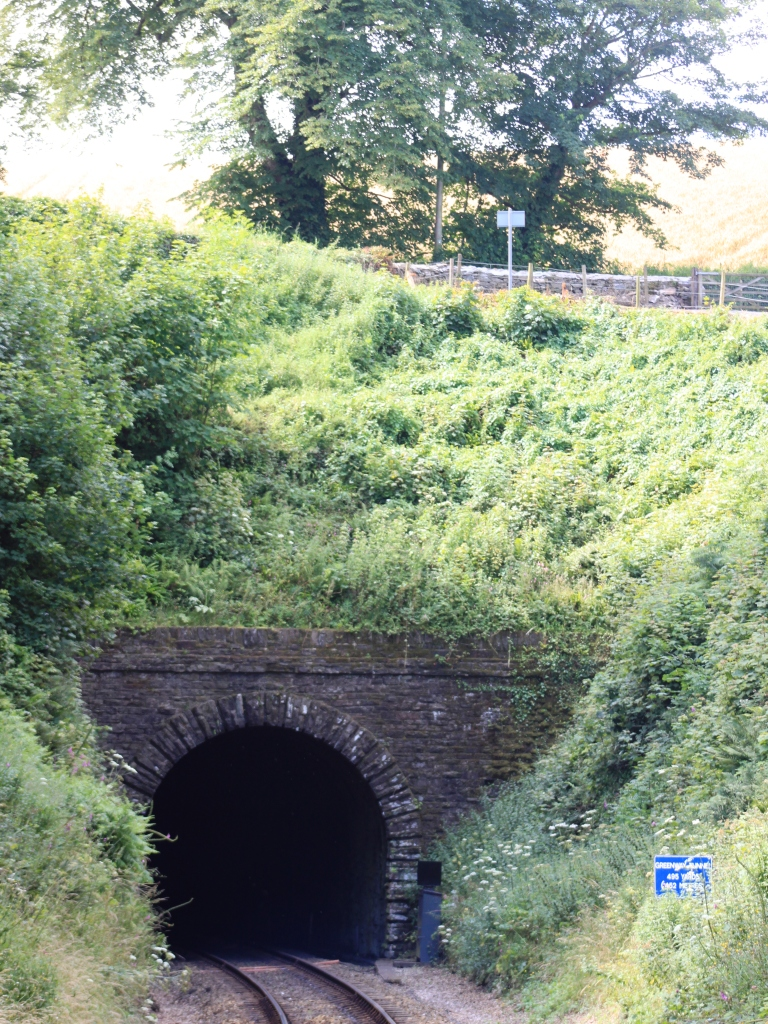
Greenway Tunnel

The line is 6 mi 57 chains (10.8 km) long and starts from its own platform at Paignton (also known as Paignton Queens Park). The shed for operational locomotives is built into the south end of the station building, although coaling is done at the north end alongside the entrance used by passengers. Immediately beyond the station the line crosses Sands Road on a level crossing. The second track, on the right, is used by GWR and CrossCountry to access the Network Rail carriage sidings. There is a crossover between the two lines that allows trains from Network Rail infrastructure to run through onto the steam railway. This is normally used by mainline railtours which run on the steam railway to Kingswear.

Opposite the Network Rail carriage sidings on the right is a siding built by the steam railway to store engineering equipment, but now mostly redundant, since the sidings alongside Goodrington Sands station were acquired. The train now calls at Goodrington Sands station (formerly Halt). Behind the platform to the right are more sidings which were transferred to the steam railway in 2007. There are two platforms at Goodrington Sands, which can also act as a passing station, although all normal trains are timetabled to pass at Churston.

At the Halt the line starts its climb up a steep gradient (initially 1 in 71, easing slightly to 1 in 93 and then rising to 1 in 60 before levelling out just before Churston) behind the beach huts that line Goodrington Beach. The 630 miles (1,014 km) South West Coast Path follows alongside the line on the right. As the train passes Goodrington Sands, Saltern Cove and Broadsands, panoramic views of the UNESCO Global Geopark geology are seen. After a small headland the train passes the secluded Saltern Cove (a site of special scientific interest for its geology and marine biology) and Armchair Rock, then swings inland to the right to pass over first the 72 yards (66 m) Broadsands Viaduct and then swings to the left over the 148 yards (135 m) Hookhills Viaduct before reaching the line's summit at Churston. The last half mile to Churston is particularly difficult in operation, as it has the steepest gradient, is on a sharp curve, and is situated in a cutting which is often damp. On the approach to the station the turntable and sidings are seen on the left; this is where the Brixham branch line used to join the Kingswear branch. The paint shop to the left is on the site of the former Brixham bay platform. The main locomotive workshop is on the right, behind the second platform. This is where trains normally pass.

From here the line drops down, gently at first (1 in 132, then level) before steepening to 1 in 77 at the Kennels Lane bridge, passing under Greenway Road and joining the stream in Hook Bottom, with Brim Hill to the right and passing Greenway Halt on the right-hand side. Shortly after the Halt the gradient eases to 1 in 100 as the train passes through the 495-yard long Greenway Tunnel. On leaving the tunnel, the gradient steepens to 1 in 66 and the River Dart appears on the right as the train passes over Greenway Viaduct. The line continues at 1 in 66 through Long Wood, a National Trust property. The line turns to the east as it leaves the original course, which continues straight on in a cutting, with a hut on the track bed. It then swings to the west over the embankment built in the early 1920s across Longwood Creek. The Noss Marina can be seen on the right. Once down to nearly river level the trees are left behind as the original course is regained. The train passes over Britannia Crossing, a level crossing over the A379 road as it approaches the Dartmouth Higher Ferry. It is from the signal box here that the signalling for the whole line is controlled. Between this point and Kingswear, the line was built mostly on the shore of the river, is accompanied by a footpath on the right, and isolates a bay on the left, formerly known as Ballast Cove. After this, there is a long siding on the left, and shorter sidings on the right which are also crossed by the Hoodown Crossing, which gives access to the Dart Harbour and Navigation Authority workshop on the right, and to a road on the north side of Waterhead Creek. After crossing the Waterhead Viaduct across Waterhead Creek, the line swings to the right and the bay platform line is seen on the left. The Marina Crossing is then crossed and the platform is reached as the line arrives at Kingswear station. A long bridge carrying the footpath crosses the whole station site. The far end of the platform is covered by an umbrella roof and then a wooden train shed, a Grade II listed structure, in the style favoured by Isambard Kingdom Brunel, although he died more than four years before the station was built. The boat- and car-park alongside the station is part of Darthaven Marina and was once a busy rail-served quayside goods yard.

The ferry across the Dart to Dartmouth leaves from the pontoon which is next to the station. Dartmouth railway station is unique in that it has never seen a train as passengers have always arrived at the station by means of the ferry from Kingswear. This Grade II listed building is now a restaurant, booking facilities for boats and trains being provided at kiosks on The Embankment.

== Rolling stock ==
=== Steam locomotives ===
Image	Number	Class	Wheels	Built	To DSR	Notes
	3803	GWR 2884	2-8-0	1939	2022	This Great Western Railway goods locomotive was withdrawn by British Railways in July 1963 and sold to the Woodham Brothers for scrap. It was sold and taken to the South Devon Railway in November 1983 to be restored and entered service there in 2005. It was sold to the Dartmouth Steam Railway in 2022 along with the remains of similar locomotive 2873.
	4110	GWR 5101	2-6-2T	1936	2019 -	4110 was built in 1936 at Swindon Works. It was rescued from Woodham Brothers scrapyard in Barry, Glamorgan in 1979 and has been to various railways but restoration has yet to be completed. It came to the Dartmouth Steam Railway in 2019 from the West Somerset Railway. but in January 2020 was taken to the East Somerset Railway for restoration and will operate there for three years when restored.
	4277 Hercules	GWR 4200	2-8-0T	1920	2008	4277 was built in 1920 at Swindon Works. It spent most of its working life in South Wales on freight trains and was withdrawn in 1964 from Aberbeeg. It was sold to the Woodham Brothers and remained in their scrapyard in Barry until 1986 when it was purchased by a private owner. It was sold to the Paignton and Dartmouth Steam Railway in 2008.
	4555 Warrior	GWR 4500	2-6-2T	1924	1973 -	4555 was built in 1924 at Swindon Works. It arrived at Paignton in 1973. It moved to the East Somerset Railway on loan from March 2020.
	5239 Goliath	GWR 5205	2-8-0T	1923	1976	5239 was built at Swindon Works in 1923 and was based at Neath until withdrawn in 1963. Like its classmate 4277 it was sold to the Woodham Brothers for scrap but was sold to the Dart Valley Railway. It was moved to Newton Abbot in 1973 where restoration was started, although it was completed after it was moved to Paignton on 22 June 1976. It entered service in 1978, the most powerful tank locomotive in preservation. It arrived on this line in 1976 and was restored to operating condition in 1978.
	7827 Lydham Manor	GWR 7800	4-6-0	1950	1973	Built in 1950 at Swindon Works, 7827 was withdrawn in 1965 and sold to the Woodham Brothers for scrap. It was sold to the Dart Valley Railway in 1970 and taken to Ashburton and then moved to Newton Abbot where its restoration was completed. It has operated trains on the Dartmouth line since Easter 1973.
	75014 Braveheart	BR Standard Class 4	4-6-0	1951	2002	Built in 1951 at Swindon Works but allocated to the London Midland Region until it was withdrawn in 1964. It was sold to the Woodham Brothers for scrap but purchased from them for restoration in 1981. It returned to service in 1994, based on the North Yorkshire Moors Railway, but sold to the Dartmouth Steam Railway in 2002. After a major overhaul it returned to service in 2016.

=== Diesel locomotives ===
Image	Number	Class	Built	To DSR	Notes
	D2192 Titan	Class 03	1961	1977	D2192 was operated by British Rail between 1961 and 1969. It was sold to the Dart Valley Railway in 1970 but moved to the Torbay Steam Railway on 24 July 1977.
	03371 (D2371)	Class 03	1958	2015	D2371 entered service with British Rail in 1958. It was later renumbered 03371 and withdrawn in 1987. It was preserved at Rowden Mill in 1988 but moved to the Dartmouth Steam Railway on 2 February 2015.
	D3014 Samson	Class 08	1952	1989	D3014 was operated by British Rail from 1952 until 1972. It was sold to the National Coal Board in 1973 for use at Merthyr Vale. It was later sold to the Paignton and Dartmouth Railway and arrived at Paignton on 4 March 1989.
	D6975	Class 37	1965	2018	Built in 1965 at the Vulcan Foundry, D6975 was first allocated to Cardiff Canton and renumbered 37275 in 1974. Following withdrawal in 1999 it was sold into preservation five years later and ended up at the South Devon Railway. In 2018, the locomotive moved to the DSR in exchange for Class 25 No. D7535, as it was considered to be better suited for the heavier trains on the line. Based at Paignton.
	37703	Class 37	1962	2023	Originally numbered D6767, this second Class 37 arrived on the Dartmouth Steam Railway towards the end of 2023.

=== Past members of the DSR fleet ===
==== Steam ====
Image	Number and name	Class	Wheels	Built	On DSR	Notes
	4588	GWR 4575	2-6-2TT	1927	1973 – ?	4588 was based at Truro for many years. After it was withdrawn it was sold for scrap but was sold to the Dart Valley railway, moving from Barry scrapyard in 1970. It was restored at Swindon Works in 1971 and entered service at Buckfastleigh. It moved to the Torbay & Dartmouth Railway when it opened in 1973.
	6412	GWR 6400	0-6-0PT	1934	1972–1976	This 'pannier tank' was the first steam locomotive to arrive ahead of the line becoming a heritage operation. It had been preserved by the Dart Valley Railway since 1965 and transferred to the new operation at Paignton in December 1972. It was sold to the West Somerset Railway in 1976 but has been based on the South Devon Railway again since 2009.

==== Diesel ====
Image	Number and name	Class	Built	On DSR	Notes
	D1013; Western Ranger	Class 52	1962	1977–1978	A 'Western' class diesel-hydraulic, Western Ranger was one of the last in operation, being withdrawn from Plymouth Laira in 1977. It was initially preserved at Kingswear before moving to the Severn Valley Railway in 1978.
	D1062; Western Courier	Class 52	1963	1977–1978	'Western' class Western Courier was withdrawn in 1974 and initially displayed at Swindon Railway Works before being sold to the Western Locomotive Association in 1976. It was based at Kingswear during 1977 and 1978 before moving to the Severn Valley Railway.
	D7535 Mercury (25185)	Class 25	1965	1984? – 2018	The locomotive left the railway in September 2018, moving to the South Devon Railway in exchange for Class 37 D6975.
	Enterprise	0-6-0DM	1954	1970s – 1980s	Hudswell Clarke built this 48 ton, 210 bhp locomotive to demonstrate the Paxman Hi-Dyne engine and a novel fluid coupling drive system. It was based on the Torbay Steam Railway for several years for shunting and engineering train operations. It was scrapped in Rotherham in or after 1992.
