= Paignton railway station =

Railway station in Devon, England

Paignton
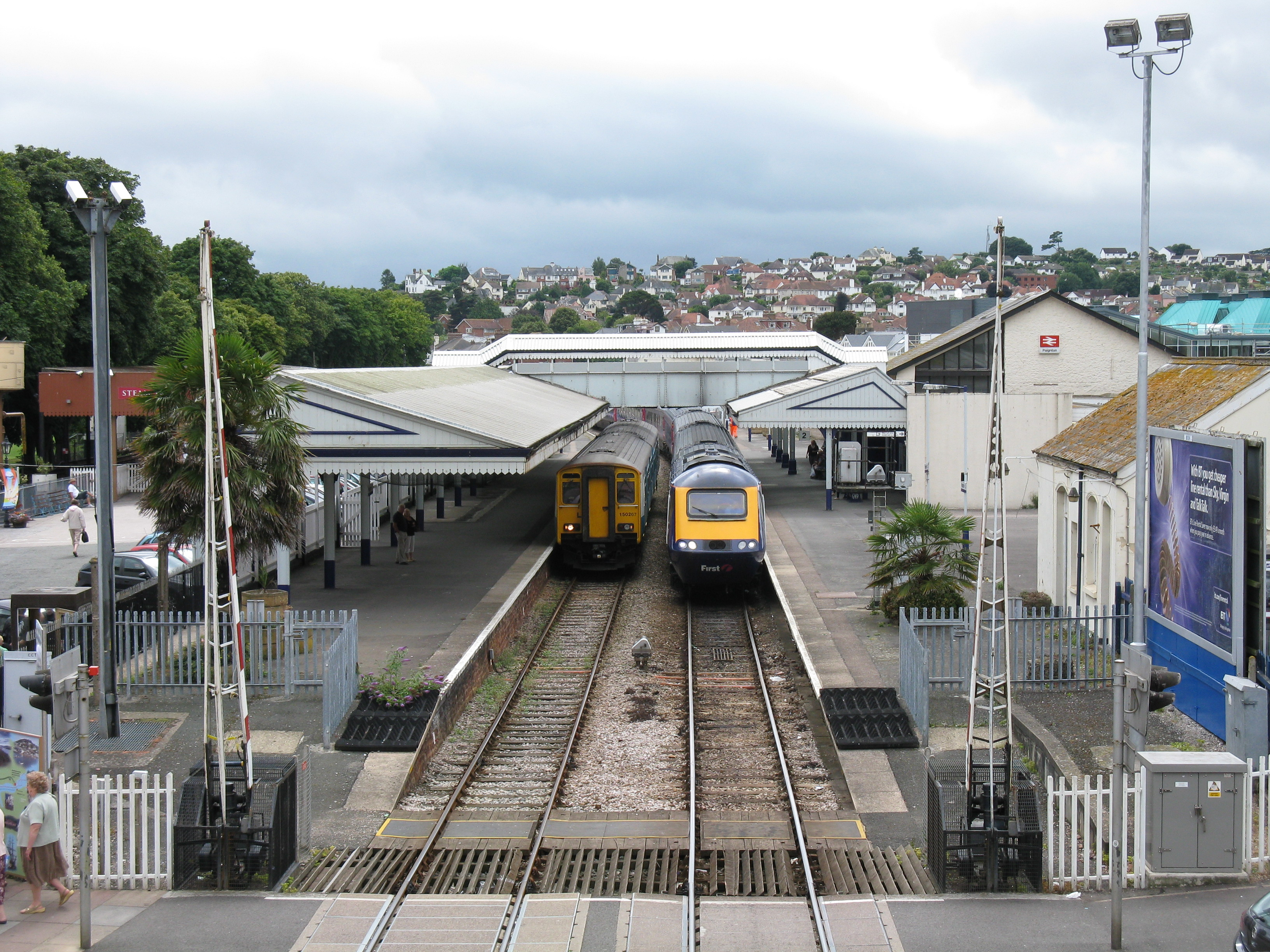
- View from the north. The Dartmouth Steam Railway station is on the left.

General information
- Location: Paignton, Torbay; England
- Coordinates: 50.435°N 3.565°W
- Grid reference: SX889605
- Manager: Great Western Railway
- Platforms: 2 National Rail, 1 Heritage Railway

Other information
- Station code: PGN
- Classification: DfT category C2

History
- Original company: Dartmouth and Torbay Railway
- Pre-grouping: Great Western Railway
- Post-grouping: Great Western Railway

Key dates
- 1859: Opened

Passengers
- 2020/21: ▼0.238 million
- 2021/22: ▲0.578 million
- 2022/23: ▲0.636 million
- 2023/24: ▲0.651 million
- 2024/25: ▲0.707 million
Location
Notes
- Passenger statistics from the Office of Rail and Road

Paignton railway station serves the town and seaside resort of Paignton in Devon, England. It is 222 miles 12 chains (358 km) from London Paddington, via Box. It opened in 1859 and is now the terminus of Riviera Line services from Exeter and heritage services on the Dartmouth Steam Railway from Kingswear.

In July 2026, the National Rail station was extensively damaged by a fire that is being investigated as suspected arson.

== History ==
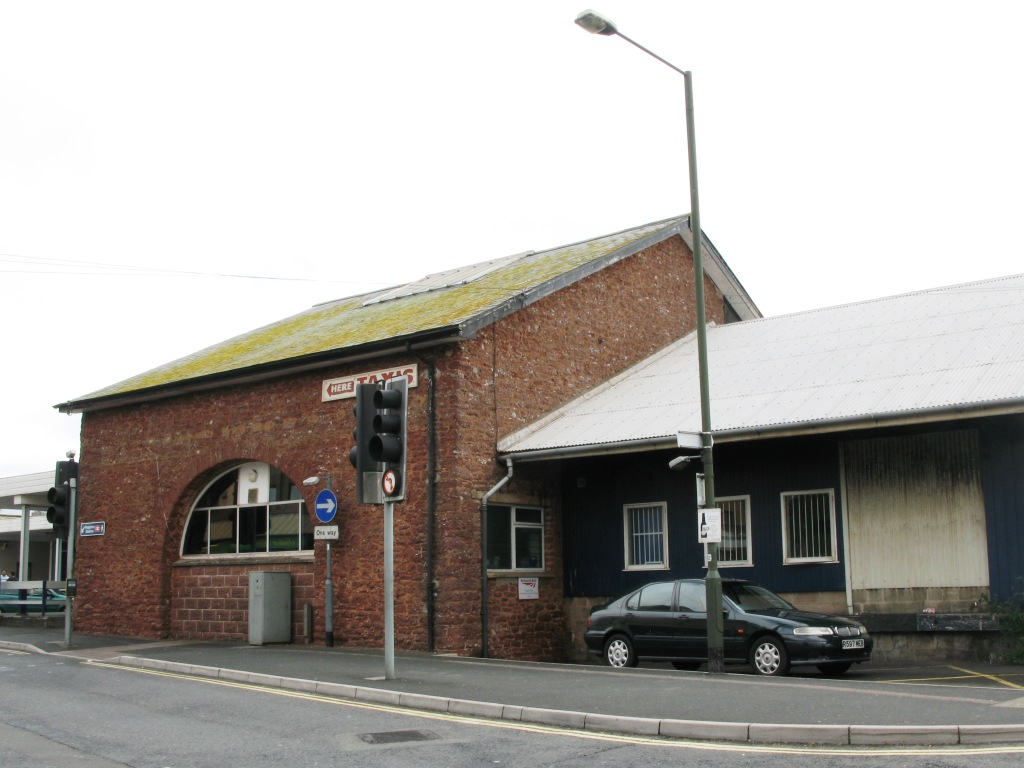
The old goods shed is now used as the ticket office

The railway to Paignton was built by the Dartmouth and Torbay Railway, opening to passengers on 2 August 1859 and extended to Brixham Road station on 14 March 1861. Goods traffic was handled at Paignton from 1 April 1861. The Dartmouth and Torbay Railway was always operated by the South Devon Railway and was amalgamated with it on 1 January 1872. This was only short-lived, as the South Devon Railway was in turn amalgamated into the Great Western Railway on 1 February 1876. The single-track line had been built using the 7 ft (2,134 mm) broad gauge, but on 20 May 1892 was converted to 4 ft 8 1/2 in (1,435 mm) standard gauge.

On 11 July 1904, GWR road motor services started running from here to Torquay, in competition with recently extended Torquay Tramways; the land opposite the station is still used as a bus station.

The line from Torquay was finally doubled in 1910, when the platforms were extended to accommodate longer trains. Further expansion came in 1924, with the opening of a larger booking office and new canopies were erected over the platforms. A few years later, the double track was extended to Goodrington and new carriage sidings opened behind the southbound platform. A new goods shed opened on 1 June 1931, just south of the station, which freed the original goods shed to deal with parcels traffic and passengers' luggage; this allowed the platforms to be extended further. In 1937, plans to move the station onto a new site south near the goods shed, which would have allowed five platforms to be constructed, failed to materialise due to World War II.

The Great Western Railway was nationalised into British Railways in 1948. In 1956, further carriage sidings were opened at Goodrington, which were used mainly to handle the heavy traffic on summer Saturdays.

The line from Paignton to Kingswear was sold to the Dart Valley Light Railway plc on 30 December 1972, which operated another nearby heritage railway at Buckfastleigh. An independent station alongside the main platform, known as Queens Park, was opened to serve the Kingswear trains on the site of the carriage sidings opened in 1930. This site includes a shed for the railway's operational engines and carriages. The line is now promoted as the Dartmouth Steam Railway.

=== July 2026 fire ===
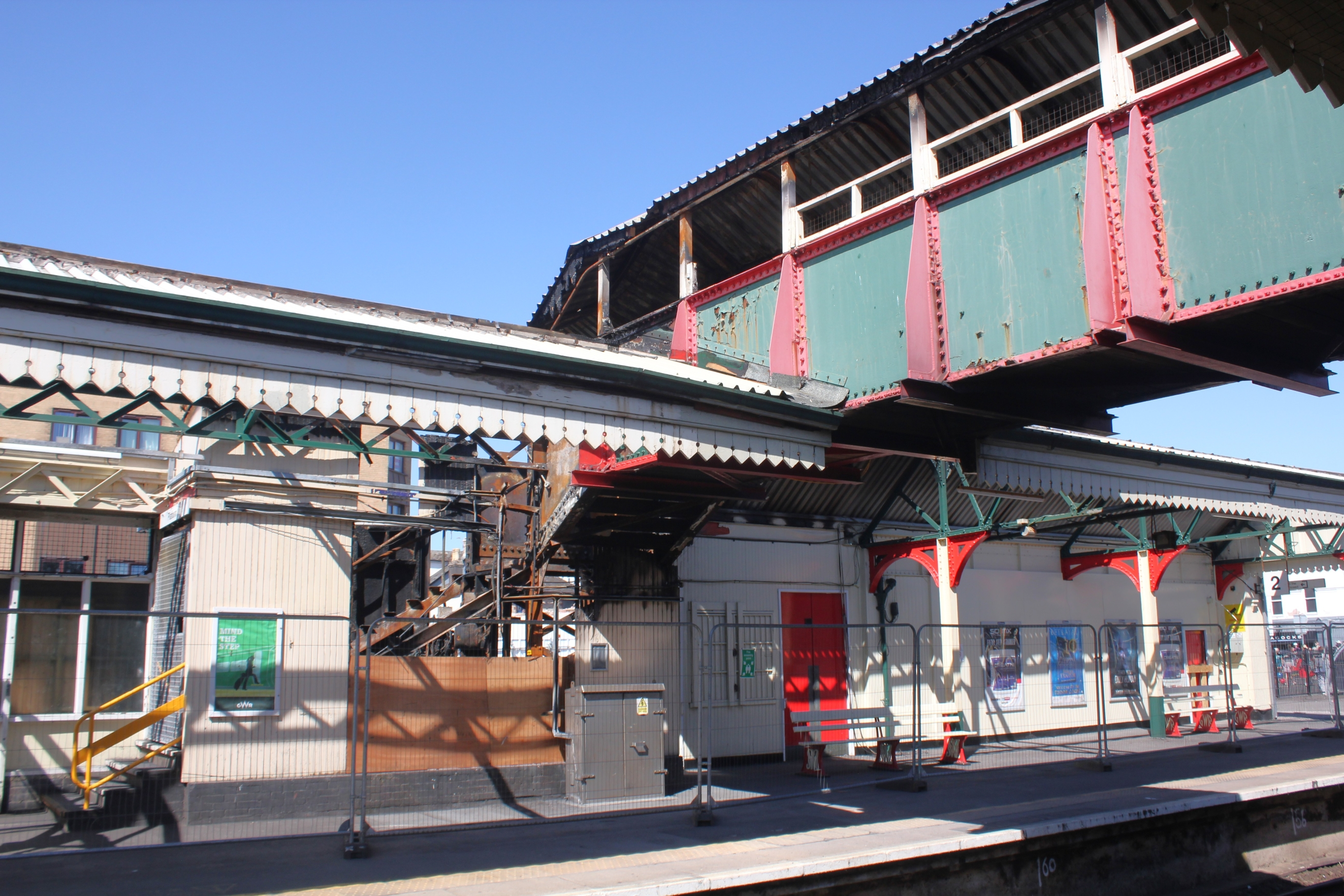
Damage to the footbridge and buildings

The National Rail platforms of Paignton railway station were closed on 21 July 2026 after a large fire. Devon and Somerset Fire and Rescue Service attended at around 05:45 BST, but the fire caused extensive damage to the footbridge and platform buildings. This led to the cancellation of all services at the station. A National Rail spokesperson said that "the fire has caused damage to the signalling system and the infrastructure around the station. Although the fire has now been extinguished, the nature of the damage means that trains are unable to run between Newton Abbot and Paignton." GWR's spokesperson said that it was a "a pretty serious fire" and that the station had been "significantly damaged". British Transport Police are investigating the incident as suspected arson. Three teenage boys have been arrested and questioned in connection with the incident.

Services between Newton Abbot and Torquay resumed on 23 July, and a partial service resumed at Paignton on 28 July. As of 28 July 2026 the long-distance services including Paignton to London Paddington are cancelled until further notice, and will start and terminate at Exeter St Davids or Newton Abbot. The full timetable was restored on 24 August. The services of the Dartmouth Steam Railway were not affected by the fire.

== Signalling ==
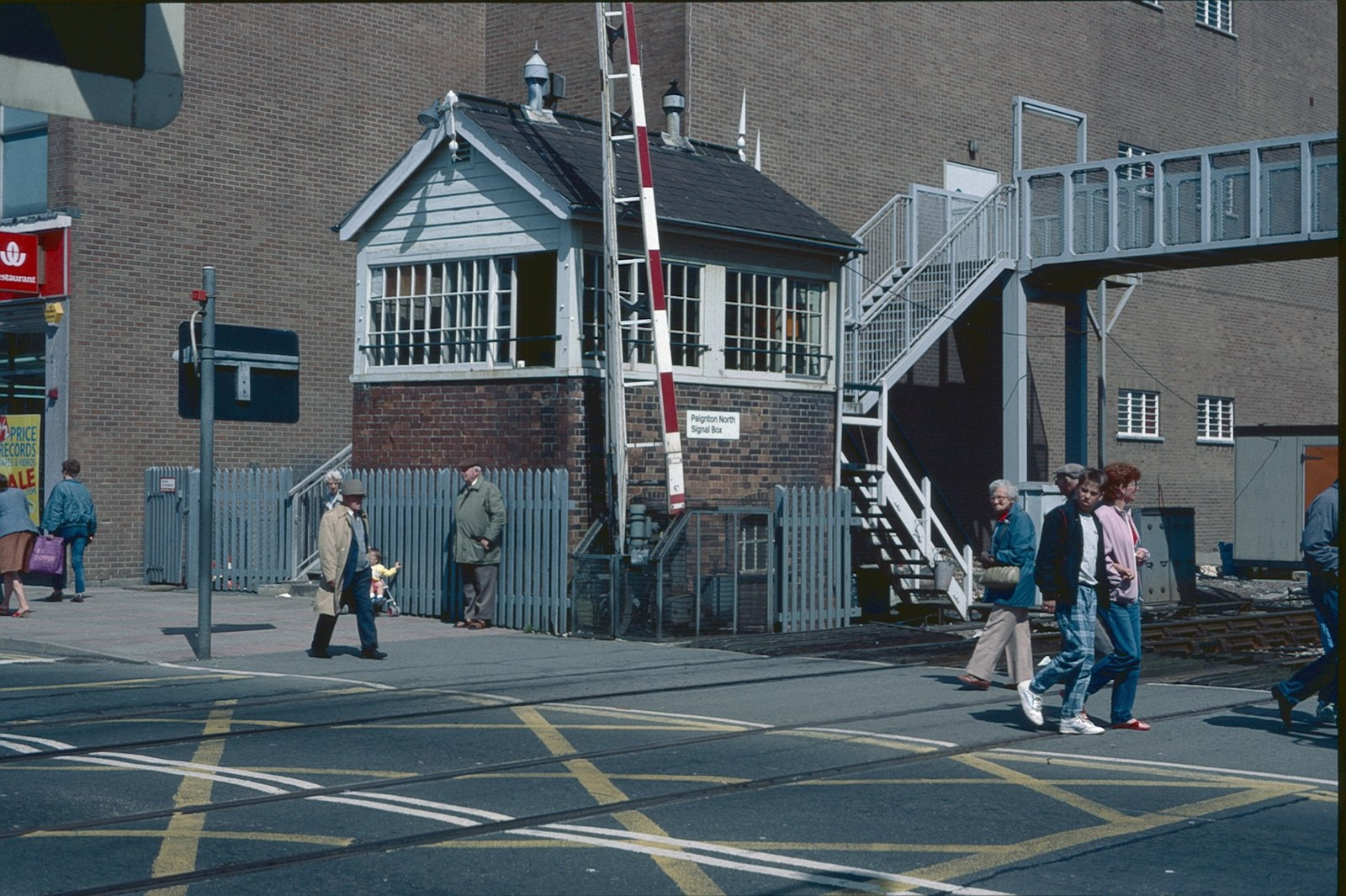
Paignton North Signal Box

Two signal boxes were opened in 1889, the 13-lever North Signal Box beside the Torbay Road level crossing, the 17-lever South Signal Box by the Sands Road level crossing. Both were replaced in 1924 by two new boxes. The North box closed on 26 March 1988 when control of trains was transferred to the Panel Signal Box at Exeter but the South box was retained to monitor the two level crossings. In 1990 this function was transferred to a panel in the station buildings and the signal box closed.

== Location ==
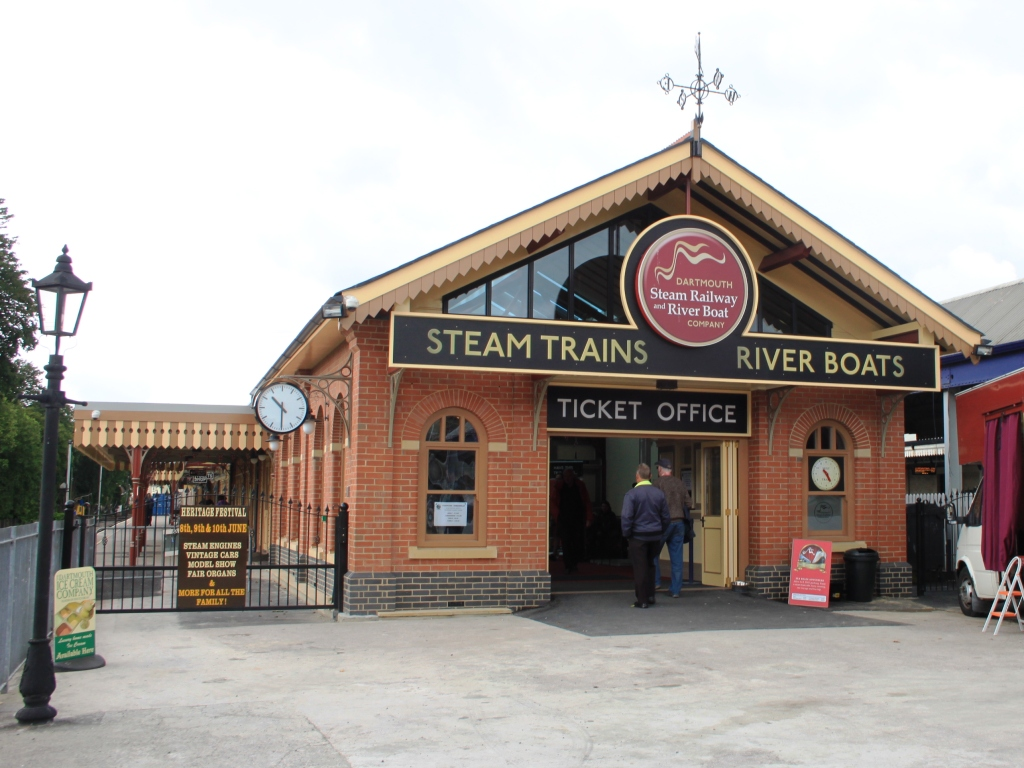
The entrance to the Dartmouth Steam Railway

The station is sandwiched between two level crossings. At the north (Torquay) end of the station is the busy crossing over Torbay Road. It has a footbridge to allow people to cross the line on foot when the crossing is closed for a train to pass. At the opposite end is the quieter Paignton South (colloquially Sands Road) crossing, which is used when trains are running on to the carriage sidings or when the heritage line to Kingswear is in operation; consequently, the two lines over this crossing are operated as single tracks with trains running in either direction on both.

Both platforms have step-free access; passengers unable to use the footbridge are able to pass from one platform to the other over the Torbay Road level crossing at the north end of the platforms.

== Platform layout ==
Most trains arrive and depart from platform 2. If a train is not returning immediately towards Newton Abbot, it may arrive at platform 1 and continue over Sands Road Level Crossing into the carriage sidings, returning later to platform 2. This is because there is no crossover which allows passenger trains to start northwards from platform 1. It is possible for short trains to shunt out of platform 1 towards Newton Abbot and return to platform 2 when it is vacant.

The Dartmouth Steam Railway has its own independent platform and entrance on the south-east side of the station. Their locomotives are coaled in the shunting neck adjacent to the approach road but the shed is at the far end of the station.

== Services ==
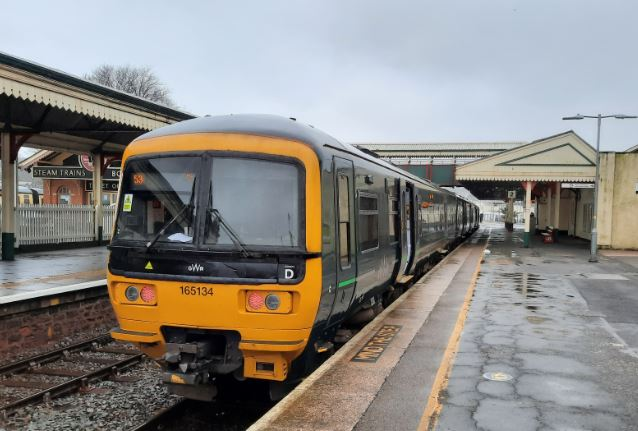
A Great Western Railway service at Paignton formed by Class 165 units

Most services at Paignton are operated by Great Western Railway. A service, generally two each hour during the daytime, is provided along the Riviera Line to and from Exeter St Davids, most of which continue on the Avocet Line through Exeter Central to and from Exmouth.

Great Western Railway also operates some long-distance services to and from London Paddington via Exeter St Davids and CrossCountry operate a few services through Bristol Temple Meads to and from Manchester Piccadilly.

The Dartmouth Steam Railway operates services to and from Kingswear although these do not operate on certain days during the winter.

| Preceding station | National Rail | Following station |
|---|---|---|
| Terminus | Great Western Railway Riviera Line | Torquay towards Exeter St Davids |
| Terminus | CrossCountry | Torquay |
| Preceding station | Heritage railways | Following station |
| Kingswear Terminus | Dartmouth Steam Railway | Terminus |

== Bibliography ==
- Beck, Keith; Copsey, John (1990). The Great Western in South Devon. Didcot: Wild Swan Publication. ISBN 0-906867-90-8.
- Cooke, RA (1984). Track Layout Diagrams of the GWR and BR WR, Section 14: South Devon. Harwell: RA Cooke.
