= Dartmouth and Torbay Railway =

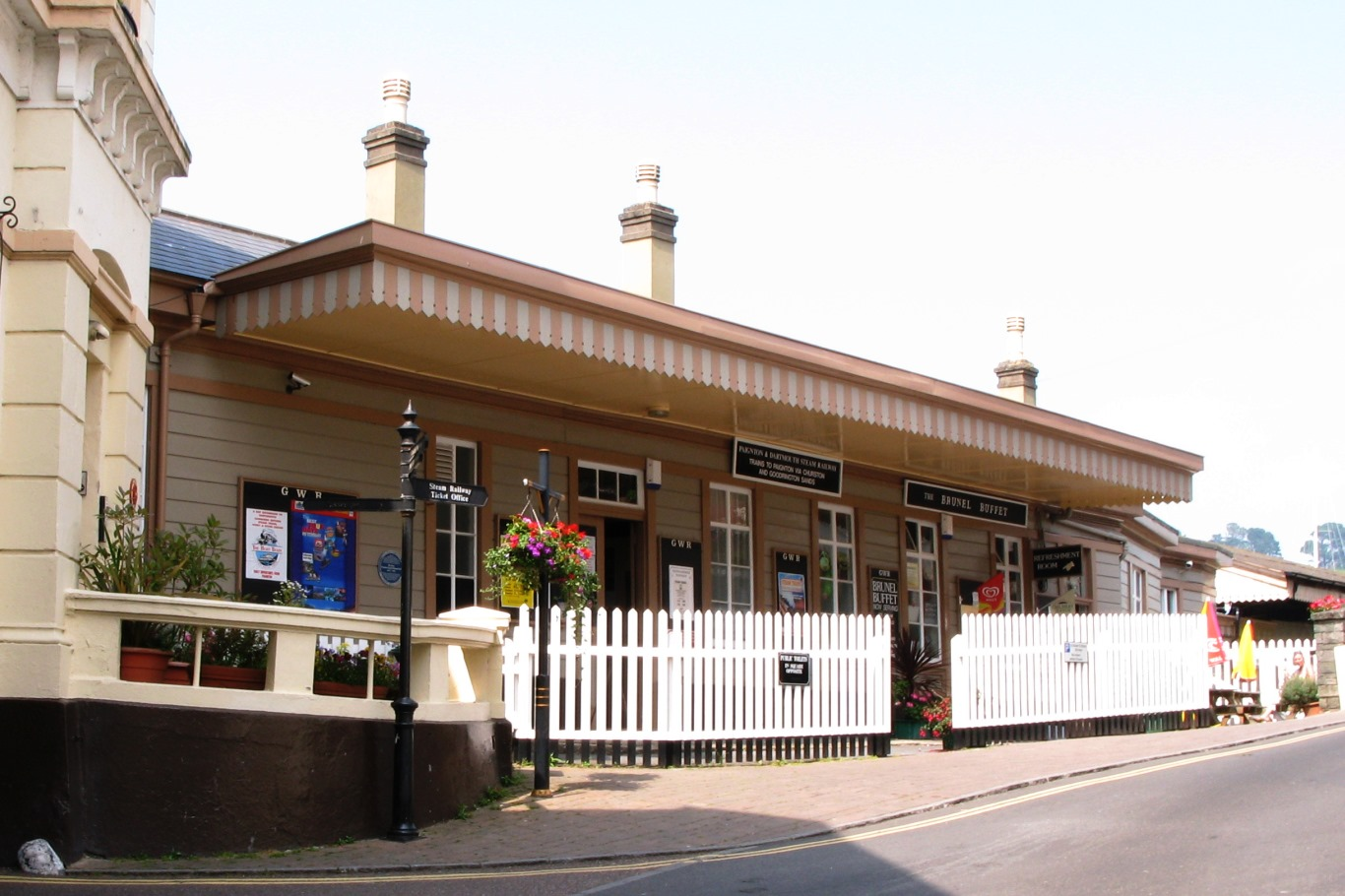
- Kingswear railway station

Overview
- Locale: Devon
- Termini: Torre; Kingswear
- Stations: 4

History
- Commenced: 1857
- Completed: 1864
- 1872: Part of South Devon Railway
- 1948: Part of British Railways
- 1972: Beyond Paignton became a heritage line

Technical
- Line length: 9.63 miles (15.50 km)
- Track gauge: 4 ft 8 1/2 in (1,435 mm) standard gauge
- Old gauge: 7 ft 1/4 in (2,140 mm) Brunel gauge until 1892

The Dartmouth and Torbay Railway was a broad gauge railway linking the South Devon Railway branch at Torquay with Kingswear in Devon, England. It was operated from the outset by the South Devon Railway.

Most of the line is now operated as the heritage Dartmouth Steam Railway but the section north of Paignton is part of Great Western Railway's Riviera Line from Exeter St Davids.

== History to 1865 ==
Torbay and Dartmouth had considerable commercial importance in the early nineteenth century. In 1844 early proposals were made for a branch from the South Devon Railway (SDR) to Torquay harbour. This failed because of objectors, but in 1845 a separate scheme was proposed for railways from Dartmouth and Brixham to Exeter (via Newton Abbot and Moretonhampstead) to make a junction with a standard gauge line. This inspired the SDR to introduce a bill to Parliament in 1846 for a broad gauge line from Aller (near Newton Abbot) to Torquay, Paignton, Brixham and Kingswear. The section beyond Torquay was dropped from the final South Devon Railway (Amendment and Branches) Act 1846 (9 & 10 Vict. c. ccccii) because of opposition from residents of Paignton and Goodrington who feared loss of access to the beach, also because the SDR was short of funds following the collapse of the atmospheric system on which it had based its propulsion system and the difficulty of reaching its primary goal, Plymouth. The SDR opened its line from Exeter to Newton Abbot (the station was called simply Newton at first) on 31 December 1846, and to a Torquay station (later renamed Torre) on 18 December 1848.

Dartmouth and Torbay Railway Act 1857
- Act of Parliament
- Parliament of the United Kingdom
- Long title: An Act for making a Railway from the Torquay Branch of the South Devon Railway to or near to Dartmouth, to be called "The Dartmouth and Torbay Railway;" and for other Purposes.
- Citation: 20 & 21 Vict. c. ciii

Dates
- Royal assent: 27 July 1857

Text of statute as originally enacted

A public meeting in Torquay in 1852 objected strongly to the SDR's idea that an extension be built to Torquay harbour. In 1853, two groups proposed (i) an extension to Torquay harbour and (ii) an extension to Paignton, Brixham and Kingswear with a branch from Livermead to Torquay harbour. However, insufficient capital was raised for either scheme to go ahead. The latter had Isambard Kingdom Brunel as engineer. A further attempt was made to raise interest, this time with Charles Seale-Hayne as chairman. The loop to Brixham was omitted in this proposal. After a great deal of canvassing and promises of financial support by the directors, and after persuading Brunel to make his estimates low, it was just possible to raise sufficient capital to proceed. The Dartmouth and Torbay Railway Company was incorporated by the Dartmouth and Torbay Railway Act 1857 (20 & 21 Vict. c. ciii), of 27 July to build from the SDR Torquay station to a point between the Higher Ferry and Waterhead Creek at Kingswear, and power to establish a ferry from Kingswear to Dartmouth, and to take over the existing Dartmouth Floating Bridge Company.

The Railway and Works by this Act authorized comprise the following; (to wit,)

- A Railway commencing by a Junction with the Torquay Branch of the South Devon Railway at or near the North End of the Torquay Station at or near Torre otherwise Torr in the Parish of Tormoham otherwise Tormohun in the County of Devon, and terminating at a Point in a Field or Enclosure adjoining the River Dart, belonging to John Fownes Luttrell, and in the Occupation of William Paige, in the Parish of Brixham in that County.
— Section 20, Dartmouth and Torbay Railway Act 1857 (20 & 21 Vict. c. ciii)

The course of the Torquay portion of the route proved controversial as it would have used a coastal viaduct at Livermead, but Brunel amended this to a course behind Livermead House, which drew objections from C. H. Mallock of Cockington Court, the landowner. The first section to open was from SDR's Torquay station to Paignton on 2 August 1859. The new company provided its own Torquay station and the SDR station was renamed 'Torre'. This short section was exceptionally difficult in engineering terms due to the difficult terrain; it included 20 bridges, a viaduct and a tunnel of 133 yards (122 m), at Oil Cove.

The next section was from Paignton to Brixham Road (later renamed Churston). Brunel had died in 1859 so Robert Pearson Brereton was now the engineer. It opened to passengers on 14 March 1861 and to goods on 1 April 1861. This too included difficult engineering: Goodrington Marsh had to be crossed, and four timber viaducts were planned, at Goodrington, Saltern Cove, Broadsands and Hookhills. However, the first two were built as embankments and the last two as masonry viaducts at the same price. The Brixham Road station was about two miles from Brixham, an important fishing port.

Dartmouth and Torbay Railway Act 1861}
- Act of Parliament
- Parliament of the United Kingdom
- Long title: An Act for authorizing the Dartmouth and Torbay Railway Company to raise further Monies; and for other Purposes.
- Citation: 24 & 25 Vict. c. xlvi

Dates
- Royal assent: 7 June 1861

Dartmouth and Torbay Railway Act 1862
- Act of Parliament
- Parliament of the United Kingdom
- Long title: An Act for extending the Period limited for the Completion of a Portion of the Railway of the Dartmouth and Torbay Railway Company, and for authorizing them to raise a further Sum of Money; and for other Purposes.
- Citation: 25 & 26 Vict. c. cxxxii

Dates
- Royal assent: 7 July 1862

Text of statute as originally enacted

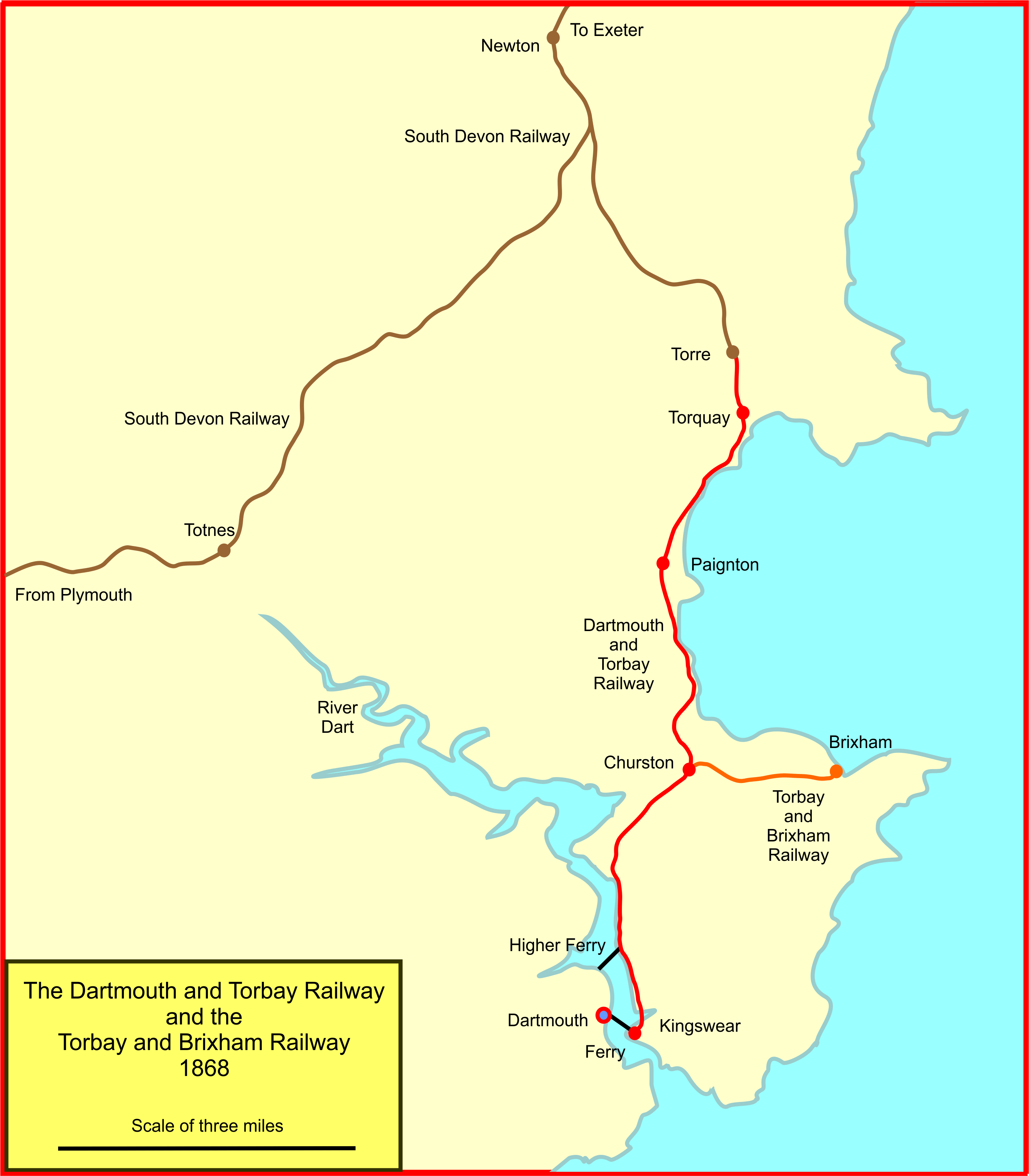
The Dartmouth & Torbay Railway and the Torbay & Brixham Railway in 1868

At this point, the company funds were exhausted and a cheaper way of reaching Dartmouth was proposed. This was to build a line to Greenway Quay on the River Dart. The deviation would have had steep gradients of 1 in 56 and a zig-zag requiring the reversal of trains very close to Greenway House and another reversal lower down. Passengers would then have used a steamer to access Dartmouth. The company pointed out that Greenway could be used at a later date for a jumping off point for a line crossing the river here and proceeding down the right bank of the river to Dartmouth itself. The relevant clauses of the deviation bill were defeated in Parliament, mainly because of objections from Mr. Harvey, the owner of Greenway. The rest of the bill became law as the Dartmouth and Torbay Railway Act 1862 (25 & 26 Vict. c. cxxxii) of 7 July 1862, authorising an extension of time for completion. The route was returned to the original authorised route to run to Hoodown, later extended to Kingswear on the east bank of the Dart. Construction was delayed while further sources of capital were sought. A major contributor was the formation of the company directors into the Dartmouth Harbour Commissioners with powers to borrow money to improve the harbour and build a 'tramway' which would complete the line to Kingswear Point. The line was opened from Brixham Road to Kingswear for passenger traffic on 16 August 1864; goods were not conveyed until 2 April 1866. A steam ferry from Kingswear to Dartmouth was operated from the day of passenger opening. A pier (the 'Éclair pier') was built at Kingswear in addition to the ferry pontoon. The pier accommodated a service to the Channel Islands for some years. There was also, briefly, a service to South Africa. An hotel, the 'Plume of Feathers' was modified and renamed the 'Royal Dart' was intended to serve passengers for these and other hoped-for services. This section too was difficult, involving considerable earthworks, a 495 yards (453 m) tunnel, a masonry viaduct near Greenway and three timber viaducts on piles, across Longwood, Noss and Waterhead Creeks.

The company bought a piece of foreshore at Dartmouth, at the end of Spithead (which was then approximately half the length of the present road). A pontoon and bridge were constructed to accommodate the company's ferry, which ran in connection with most (but not all) train services. A booking office was opened, in the form of a hut on the pontoon.

At Kingswear a wharf was built to accommodate the coal traffic for bunkering of ships in the harbour and for the transfer of coal from ships to trains for the Torquay Gas Works.

The lengths of the line, all single track, were:

- Torre to Paignton: 2 mi 78 ch (4.8 km)
- Paignton to Brixham Road: 2 mi 72 ch (4.7 km)
- Brixham Road to Kingswear: 3 mi 63 ch (6.1 km)

== Later history ==
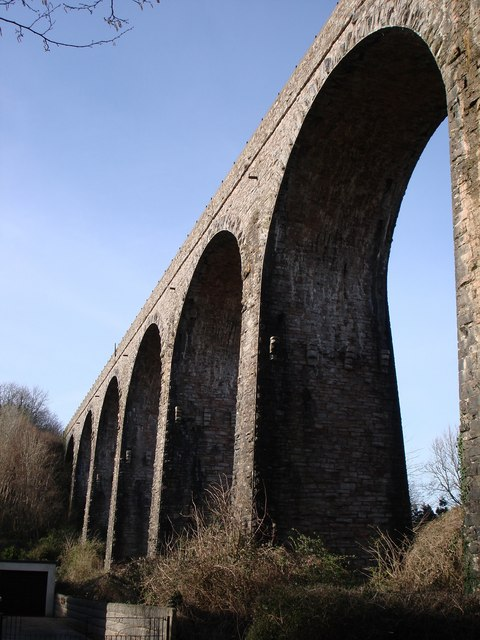
Rebuilt Hookhills Viaduct

The line was worked and operated from the outset by the South Devon Railway, and it was leased to them in perpetuity from 1 January 1866. After that time the company was a financial entity only until 1872, when it was formally absorbed into the SDR.

Brixham Road station was a poor facility for the important fishing town of Brixham, and an independent company, the Torbay and Brixham Railway constructed a short line to directly serve Brixham. It opened on 28 February 1868 to passengers, goods traffic being handled from 1 May 1868. The line was 2 miles and 6 chains (3.3 km) long, and joined the Dartmouth and Torbay Railway at Brixham Road station, which was renamed Churston from the day of opening of that line.

On 1 February 1876 the South Devon Railway amalgamated with the Great Western Railway and the Bristol and Exeter Railway, forming the new Great Western Railway. As the Dartmouth line was then part of the SDR, it became a part of the GWR.

In 1888, agreement was finally obtained between the GWR, the harbour commissioners and Dartmouth Borough Council for the completion of the GWR's portion of the new Dartmouth Embankment and the building of a new station.

The West of England lines of the GWR, including the lines of the former Dartmouth and Torbay Railway, were converted from the original broad gauge of 7 ft 1/4 in (2,140 mm) to what was now standard gauge, 4 ft 8 1/2 in (1,435 mm) in a huge engineering project over a single weekend, from 20 May 1892 and 23 May 1892.

The tunnel at Oil Cove, south of Torquay, was opened out in 1910. It was replaced by the bridge that carries Torbay Road.

The two wooden viaducts, Longwood and Noss, a short distance north of Kingswear, were abolished and the line deviated to by-pass them in 1921. In 1928 the timber viaduct at Waterhead Creek was replaced by a double track concrete and steel bridge. After that, it was no longer necessary to change locomotives at Paignton, as the largest locomotives could continue to Kingswear, including those hauling the prestigious Torbay Express. This included the GWR 6000 Class or "King" class.

On 1 November 1972 the line between Goodrington Sands and Kingswear was transferred to private ownership and operated as a heritage railway.

== Stations ==
- Torre (South Devon Railway station)
- Torquay
- Paignton
- Brixham Road (renamed Churston from 28 February 1868)
- Kingswear
- Dartmouth (ferry terminal on west bank of River Dart)

For stations opened on the line after take over by the Great Western Railway please see Riviera Line and Dartmouth Steam Railway.

== Dartmouth ferry ==
The Dartmouth ferry is now operated by the heritage Dartmouth Steam Railway.
