= Dart Harbour & Navigation Authority =

- Company type: Trust port
- Predecessors: River Dart Navigation Commission, Dart Harbour Commission
- Founded: 1976
- Headquarters: Dartmouth, Devon, United Kingdom
- Number of locations: 1
- Area served: River Dart harbour limits
- Services: maintenance of the harbour, navigation marks and moorings, monitoring VHF channel 11 (Callsign DartNav), Dart Harbour Taxi (VHF channel 69)
- Website: dartharbour.org

The Dart Harbour & Navigation Authority (DHNA) is a trust port responsible under United Kingdom law for the stewardship of Dartmouth Harbour. The Authority was formed in 1976 from the merger of the River Dart Navigation Commission and the Dart Harbour Commission which had been established in the 1880s. It was constituted under the Dart Harbour and Navigation Authority Act 1975, and The Dart Harbour and Navigation Harbour Revision (Constitution) Order 2002.

Dart Harbour's navigation marks are inspected annually by Trinity House.

Dart Harbour maintains some 270 pontoons and 1,600 moorings within the harbour limits.

== See also ==
- Britannia Royal Naval College
- Dart Lifeboat Station
- Dartmouth Higher Ferry
- Dartmouth Lower Ferry
- Dartmouth Passenger Ferry
- NCI Froward Point
