= Dartmouth Ferry =

The Dartmouth Ferry, sometimes called the Kingswear Ferry, may refer to one of three ferries that link Dartmouth and Kingswear, on opposite sides of the River Dart in the English county of Devon. From north to south, these ferries are:

- Dartmouth Higher Ferry, a vehicular cable ferry
- Dartmouth Passenger Ferry, a passenger ferry
- Dartmouth Lower Ferry, a vehicular and passenger ferry

There is also the Halifax–Dartmouth Ferry Service in Nova Scotia, Canada.
