= Dartmouth Harbour =

Natural harbour on the River Dart in Devon, England

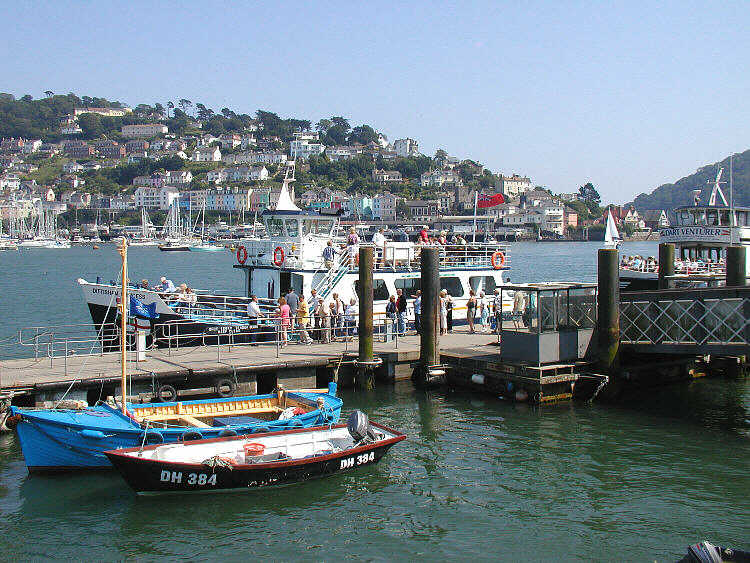
- Dartmouth Harbour, with Kingswear in the background, and River Dart cruise boats alongside Dartmouth Town Jetty.

- Location within Devon
- Location: Devon County, England, UK
- Coordinates: 50°21′06″N 3°34′40″W
- River sources: Dart River
- Basin countries: United Kingdom
- Settlements: Dartmouth
- References: Dartmouth Harbour

Dartmouth Harbour (also Dart Harbour) is a natural port located in Dartmouth, Devon, England. It is situated at the mouth of the River Dart on the English Channel. Bayard's Cove Fort is a small fort, which was built to defend the harbour's entrance. The crafts which dock at the port are mainly local fishing vessels, naval ships and luxury yachts; warships routinely visit the harbour. The River Dart is navigable from Dartmouth to the old weir location at Totnes.

== Geography ==
The harbour is located at the mouth of the River Dart (the name 'Dart' is Brythonic Celtic meaning 'river where oak trees grow'), which rises high on Dartmoor, and enters the sea at Dartmouth. The river begins as two separate branches (the East Dart and West Dart), which join at Dartmeet. The rivers are crossed by a number of clapper bridges, notably at the hamlet of Postbridge. At Totnes a weir (of the 17th century vintage rebuilt in the 1960s) has been constructed across the river. The river reach between the Totnes weir and the port is tidal and hence navigable, and there are no bridges across the river in this reach. The banks of the lower Dart are covered in ancient woodland of native oak. The entrance to the river from the sea is rocky with cliffs on either side. The lower section of the River Dart forms the Dartmouth Harbour, a deep water natural harbour with a long history of maritime usage.

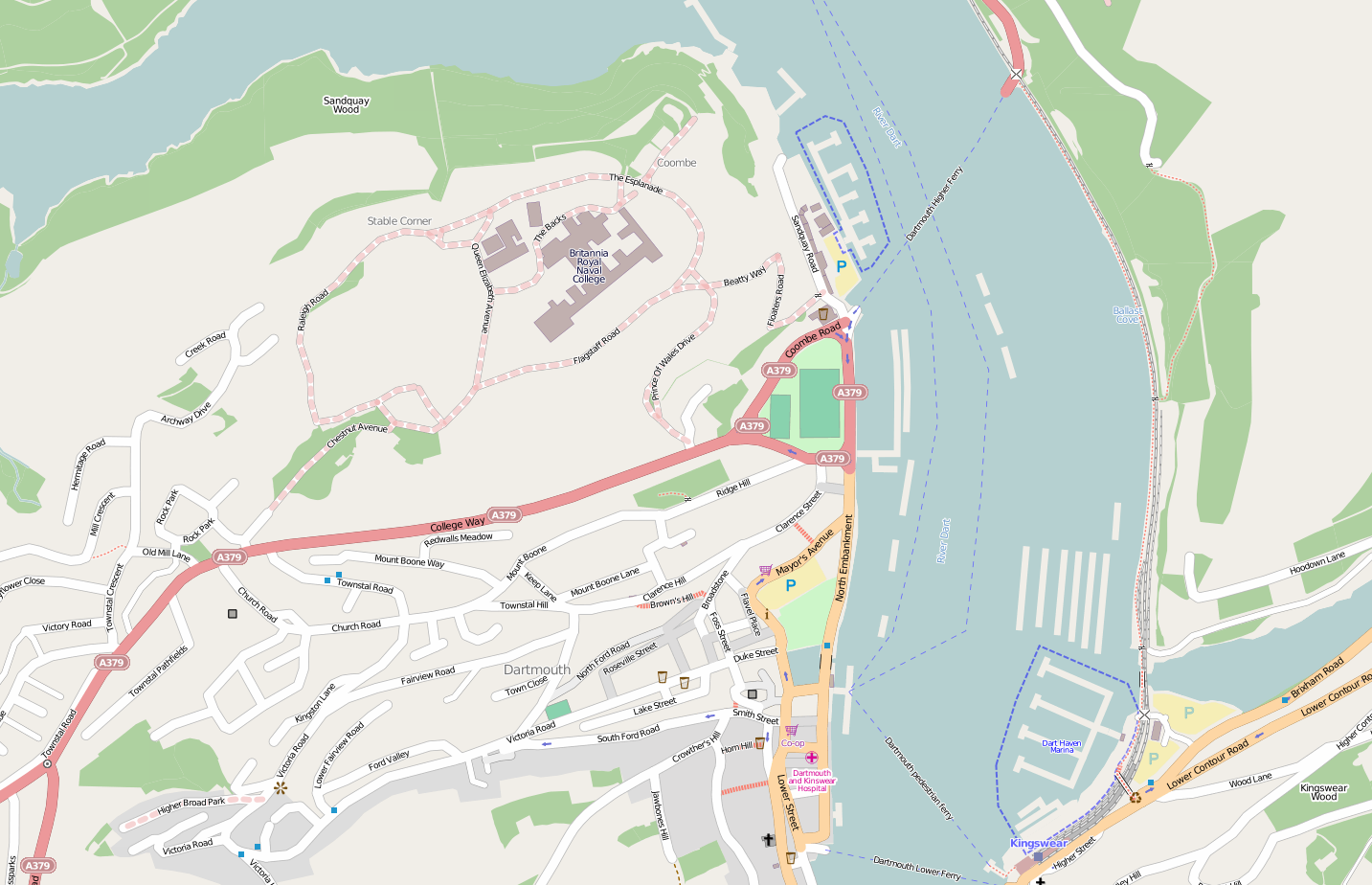
Map of Dartmouth

The low coast line rises gradually. The harbour entrance is 5 miles (8.0 km) to the south west of Berry Head. On the east side, Kingswear Castle is located very close to the water's edge, and on the west side, Dartmouth Castle is built on a rocky promontory. Visible landmarks from the entrance to the harbour are: the outline of Dartmoor Range which has granite peaks of Hayton (rugged peak); Rippon with single carn 1,525 feet (465 m); Stoke Fleming Church built on a high ground, about 1.75 miles (2.82 km) to the west of the entrance; and Mewstone, a rocky islet about 0.75 miles (1.21 km) east of the entrance. Dartmouth is located on the right bank of the estuary.

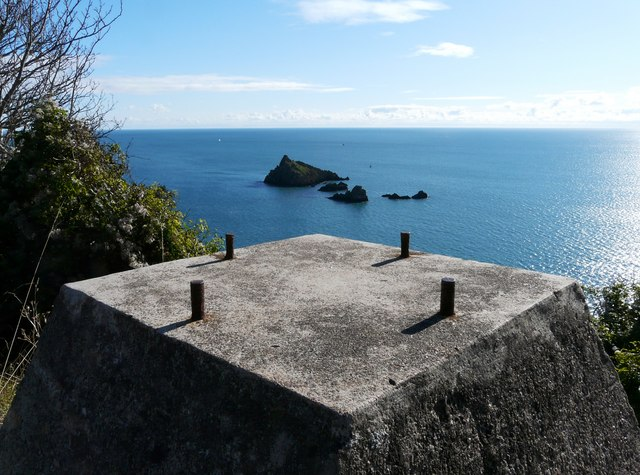
Brownstone Battery foundation overlooking Mew Stone.

The tide rise is about 14 feet (4.3 m) and the patent slips are of 250 feet (76 m) and 450 feet (140 m) length, capable of berthing large vessels. Navigation up to Totnes is possible for 10 miles (16 km) along the River Dart. Blackstone rock, 8 feet (2.4 m) above high water level, is a landmark for ships to bypass shoals at the entrance. Entrance to the bay is 220 yards (200 m) wide between the rocks but as it widens into the harbour it provides enough room for vessels of any draught and fairly large capacity to berth safely. However, during rough weather it is dangerous to navigate through the entrance due to the rough rocky faces, and for miles without any sand bars for protection.

== Features ==
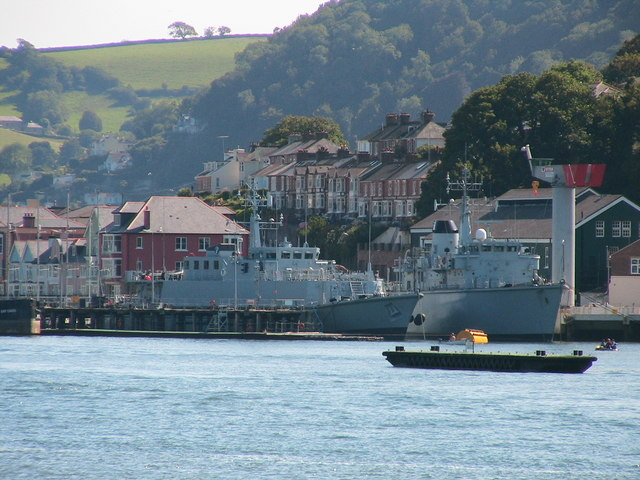
Sandquay shipyard within the harbour.

The port is available 24 hours a day. Up to the minute tidal information is available from Dart Harbour administration, based on UK Hydrographic Office data. It is a very busy port with about 2,800 moorings including 200 visitors’ moorings. Dart Harbour administration has a specific Moorings’ Policy to help guide its moorings decisions. It is said that in modern times, the port's commercial activity has declined, but it is still a busy port for local fishing vessels and a wide variety of yachts and other private boats and cruise ships. Several local companies specialise in shipbuilding and repairs to small tonnage craft. Large cruise ships are occasional visitors; the largest visitor to date was the MS The World, a residential cruise ship as well as the sailing yacht Eos (built in Bremen, Germany) before it was delivered to her owner in the Bahamas and another cruise ship, the Le Diamant in September 2012, with MV Minerva visiting on 11 July 2010. Smaller naval Picket Boats and whalers are often seen carrying out training exercises in the harbour and river. The port facility is under the International Ship and Port Facility Security Code (ISPS Code). A bunkering facility is available. Plymouth, Exeter and Bristol airports are easily accessible from the port by local transport.

The light provided on the 85 feet (26 m) tower (above high tide), as of 1871, could be seen over a distance of 11 miles (18 km) in clear weather. Another fixed leading light, 110 feet (34 m) seaward of the first tower is at 70 feet (21 m) above high tide and the two lights together guide the ships to the center of the entrance channel. After passing through the channel between Castle and Kettle points, the fixed light provided at the guard station at the southern end of the town guides ships into the anchorage through the fairway. Red light is flashed to indicate shoals to the north of the harbour and green light is flashed to indicate the shoals over the south point, off "One Gun Point". A day time beacon in the form of a truncated pyramid of 85 feet (26 m) height on the land to the eastern side of the entrance, about 500 feet (150 m) above sea level, is meant to guide ships.

== Visitor attractions ==
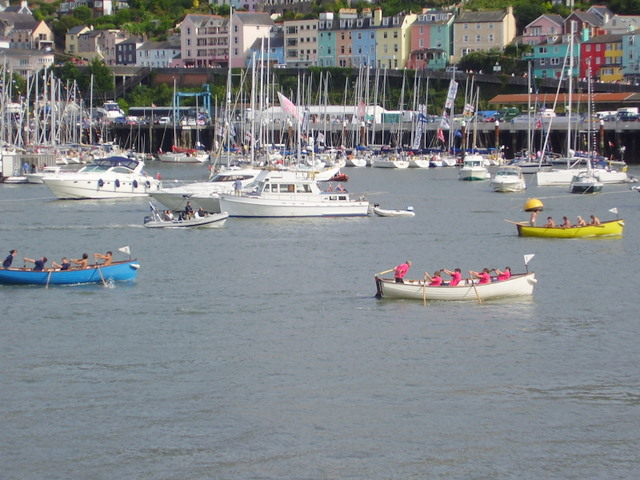
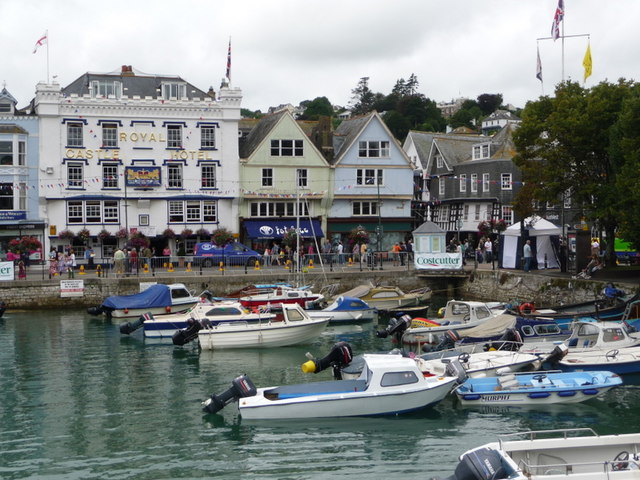
Dartmouth Regatta (left); the marina and Royal Castle Hotel (right).

Visitor attractions from the port are the Dartmoor National Park and the Bovey Castle (now a hotel). Good quality produce is available, with some of the best shellfish areas in the whole of the UK, as well as Sharpham Vineyard and Cheese Dairy (for the best of wines), and a hot air balloon over the nearby countryside. The harbour and port are popular leisure boating locations, and several marinas and boat yards are located on the river. The Port of Dartmouth Royal Regatta takes place annually over three days at the end of August.

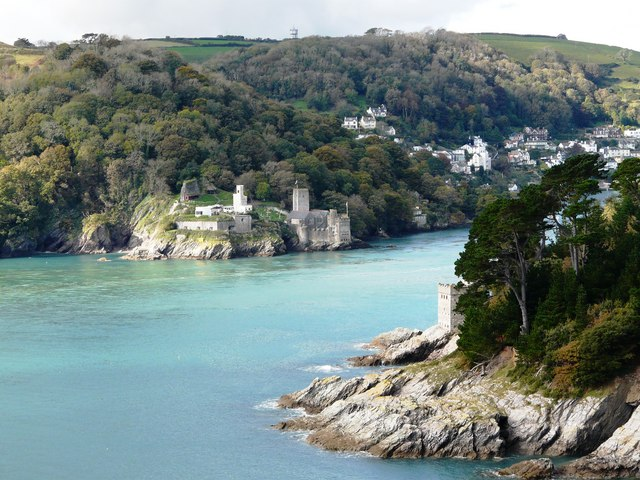
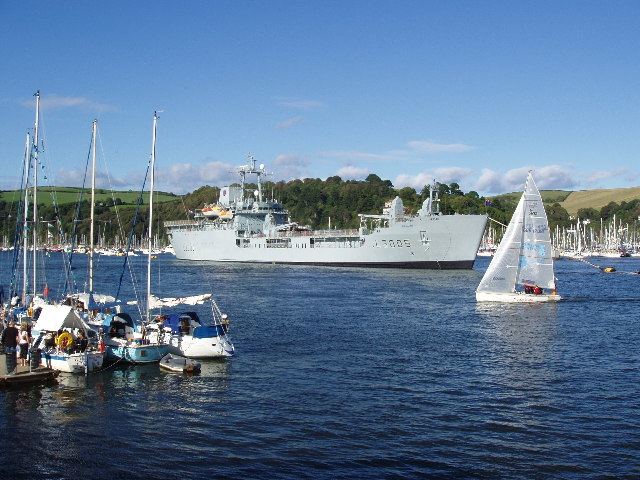
Mouth of the Dart and its two castles (left); Royal Navy ship at Dartmouth (right).

The ancient town around the Dart Harbour town has a long history. Other historical sites at the estuary of Dart are Dartmouth Castle and Kingswear Castle, which is painted white on its front face towards the sea. The castles once operated a defensive chain across the estuary, which was raised at dusk to block enemy ships attempting to attack the harbour. The remains of the operating mechanisms for the chain are still visible in Dartmouth Castle. Dartmouth Castle's artillery blockhouse, dated to 1481, was constructed to protect the harbour. Dartmouth is also the home of the Britannia Royal Naval College (with links to the British Royal family) and as a result is routinely visited by sizable naval ships.

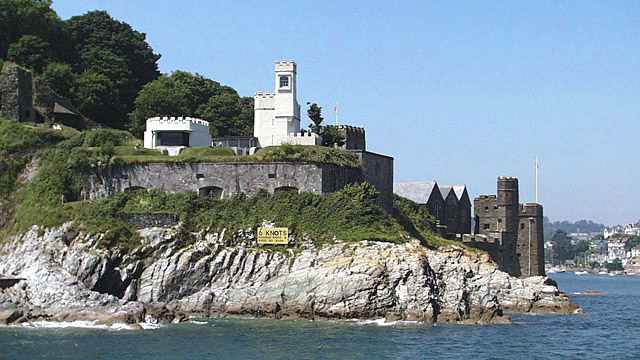
Dartmouth Castle was built to protect the harbour.

== See also ==
- Dartmouth Higher Ferry
- Dartmouth Lower Ferry
- Dartmouth Passenger Ferry
