= Royal Castle Hotel =

Hotel in Devon, England

The Royal Castle Hotel

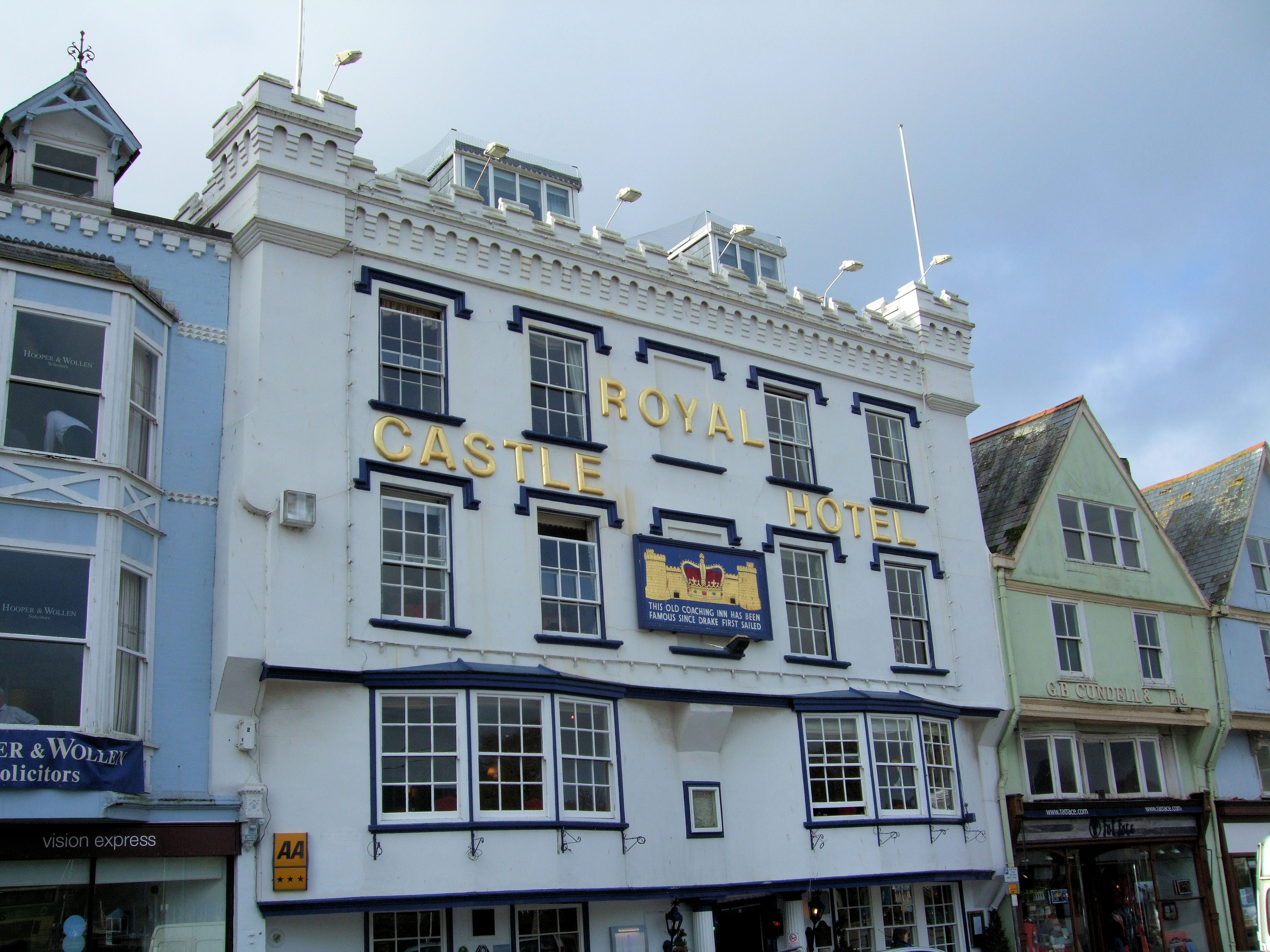

- Location in Devon

General information
- Location: Dartmouth, Devon, England
- Coordinates: 50°21′8″N 3°34′43″W
- Opening: 1639

Technical details
- Floor count: 4

Other information
- Number of rooms: 25
- Number of restaurants: 1

The Royal Castle Hotel is a hotel in Dartmouth, Devon, England. Guests have included Queen Victoria, Sir Francis Drake, and Mary (who later became Mary II of England). The hotel was used as a location for the 1984 film, Ordeal by Innocence, which was based on the 1958 Agatha Christie novel of the same name. Agatha Christie renamed the hotel the Royal George in 'The Regatta Mystery', a short story that first appeared in The Strand Magazine in 1936 and which currently forms part of the 1991 short story collection Problem at Pollensa Bay. It holds three stars in the AA rating system and looks across Dartmouth Harbour and the River Dart estuary.

== History ==
The hotel was built in 1639, but there was evidently a previous hotel or inn on the site because Sir Francis Drake reputedly stayed there. Many of the mistresses of Charles II were said to have stayed at the hotel. In 1688, Mary stayed at the hotel after she and her husband William (who later became William III of England) arrived in England from the Netherlands to claim the throne. Edward VII and Cary Grant have also been guests. Agatha Christie, another guest, changed the name of the hotel to the Royal George for her novel Ordeal by Innocence.

The hotel is reputedly haunted by an old stagecoach which draws up to the front door to collect phantom passengers in the night. Carriages served the hotel until 1910. Horse hooves, the opening and shutting of a carriage door and footsteps have been heard by guests. Apart from the stage coach's arrival, sounds of horses clattering on the cobble stones are also heard, particularly during the early morning hours of the autumn season. The story linked to this paranormal phenomenon is that William and Mary were to stay at the Royal Castle Hotel in 1688 but as a storm prevented William from reaching the hotel, he lodged nearby in Torbay. Mary, however, reached the Royal Castle Hotel in a carriage at 2 AM and from that time onwards, the stage has started appearing in paranormal form at the entrance to the hotel. Along with whip cracking and horse whining, an invisible clock chimes twice in a back street of the hotel following the departure of the carriage.

== Architecture ==
The hotel is a grade II* listed building, of the early Georgian style but with a Victorian facade, four stories with an attic, painted white, built as two separate merchant houses. It has 24 rooms, with a "glassed-in courtyard", a winding wooden staircase, 46 antique spring bells, the original coaching horn and numerous antiques. The main restaurant is located on the first floor, with 2 bars at ground level - the Galleon bar and the Harbour bar. Nine rooms have a jacuzzi bath and five rooms contain a four-poster bed. Reputedly the timber beams downstairs were salvaged from the wreck of the Spanish Armada. An 1895 advertisement by Robert Cranford said "Patronised by Royalty. Fitted with Electric Light and Bells.... and sanitary arrangements are perfect." Other notable features in the hotel are old leather-bound books in the library, woodwork from a "Spanish man-o-war in the Galleon bar", antique chaises longues, huge carved chairs, and velvet curtains.
