= Dartmouth Chronicle =

The Dartmouth Chronicle is an online newspaper based in the area of Dartmouth, Devon, England, UK. Its head office is in Kingsbridge, Devon. The outlet is "owned or licensed to Tindle Newspapers Ltd.", the group being described on its website as "Independent Family-Owned Newspapers".

The Dartmouth History Research Group, in association with the Kingswear Historians, digitised images of many editions of the Dartmouth Chronicle between 1855 and 1884.
