= Port of Dartmouth Royal Regatta =

Regatta in Devon, England

- Status: Active
- Genre: Regatta
- Frequency: Annually, in August
- Venue: Dartmouth, Devon, England
- Founded: 1822
- Website: https://www.dartmouthregatta.co.uk

The Port of Dartmouth Royal Regatta is a regatta in the English county of Devon. The first recorded regatta was in 1822 and the regatta was formally established in 1834. It is based on the River Dart, in the town of Dartmouth, and the village of Kingswear opposite.

The Regatta takes place over the Thursday, Friday and Saturday where the Friday is the last Friday in August. The Regatta is formally opened on the preceding Wednesday evening, although as the regatta has grown, some events start as early as the weekend before.

The Regatta is organised by a committee, and a review is presented at a public meeting each year called by Dartmouth Town Council. Many other organisations are involved in running events under the auspices of the Regatta Committee.

In 2025 the event celebrated its 180th anniversary with headline sponsors Rolls-Royce Holdings, which can be noted in the design of a new logo to celebrate the 180th year. Rolls-Royce Holdings continue to be headline sponsors in 2026. This is the first time the event has had a major sponsor since Volvo Sailing in 2016.

== History ==
The first recorded regatta in Dartmouth was in 1822. There were three sailing races, one six-oared gig race, and a military band played out at the Dartmouth Castle and 120 attended a ball.

In 1834 the regatta, which used to be run by leading gentlemen of the neighbourhood, changed its format when the inhabitants of the town called a meeting and elected a committee of their own.

In 1856 it became a Royal Regatta when Queen Victoria, Prince Albert and the Prince of Wales came into Dartmouth in a flotilla of nine boats on an unscheduled visit because of bad weather, arriving the day before the regatta started on 11 August. Prince Albert and his son went up to Sharpham Point in the new steamboat Dartmouth, which had arrived on the river only the previous day. The Queen followed in the state barge, going as far as Dittisham. The Queen came ashore at 6 pm and was met by the borough mayor. The Queen then drove in a carriage over 'The Ridges' to the 'Black House' at the junction of Jaw Bones/Swannaton Road/Stoke Fleming Road. She was accompanied by Sir Henry P. Seale on horseback. That night there were special illuminations both ashore and afloat. The Queen donated £25 and Prince Albert gave £20 for three rowing races to be competed for by the sailors of Dartmouth and this was done on the second day of the regatta. The Queen the next day sailed on to Plymouth but before leaving bestowed the title of 'Royal' on the regatta.

The Committee write each year to the Monarch to request the renewal of the Royal Patronage.

The patron was Prince Andrew, the Duke of York, he last visited the Royal Regatta on its 175th anniversary celebrations in 2019. The patronage was returned to Her Majesty the Queen in 2022.

Due to COVID-19 restrictions, the Regatta Committee took the decision to cancel the event in 2020 - only the 11th time it had been cancelled since 1834. The Port of Dartmouth Royal Regatta celebrated its 179th event over the week of 24-31 August 2024

The Regatta was awarded a Silver Visit Devon tourism award in 2019, in the category Best Tourism Event/Festival of the year.

In 2025 The Royal Regatta celebrated its 180th Regatta, and in 2026 the Opening Ceremony will take place on Wed 26 Aug 26.

== Events ==
Although the event is described as a regatta, the charter specifically provides that a regatta should take place on the River Dart during a fair in the town. To many visitors, the events in the town are more visible, but there is a vast array of events both on and off the water.

=== Rowing ===
There are two distinct forms of rowing competitions that take place throughout the week.

The West of England Amateur Rowing Association holds one stage of its championship on the Thursday. This rowing is in skiffs and sculls, with competitors from across the West of England and further afield.

With heats commencing on the Sunday preceding Regatta Week and finals in Regatta Friday, the local rowing is at the heart of Dartmouth Royal Regatta, where local crews (representing pubs and clubs from the town) compete over various distances in purpose built rowing boats.

=== Air displays ===
The regatta has for many years hosted the Red Arrows RAF display team.

Historically, displays have also been made by the Royal Navy Lynx helicopter display team, the Black Cats. In addition, the Battle of Britain Memorial Flight, RAF Typhoon, Harrier and Jaguar aircraft have displayed, along with RN Sea King and Chinook helicopters. In recent years it has also had The Royal Artillery parachute display team landing in the river Dart.

More recently, in light of restrictions in place, the focus of the event has been on activities afloat and ashore rather than in the air, and air displays have become less prevalent.

=== Running ===
Organised in association with the Dartmouth Amateur Athletics Club, adult road races to Stoke Fleming (up what is possibly the steepest hill in any regular race, Weeke Hill) and back, and fun races for children are held.

=== Tennis ===
An LTA recognised tournament is held on the courts in Coronation Park and at the Britannia Royal Naval College, with events covering mixed doubles and the normal singles and doubles matches.

=== Sailing ===
Four days of events are held in Start Bay, along with fun sailing in the River Dart. This regatta is one of the largest sailing events in the United Kingdom. The sailing events are organised by the Joint Regatta Sailing Committee (Royal Dart Yacht Club and Dartmouth Yacht Club) under the auspices of the regatta committee.

=== Guardship ===
Traditionally, a Royal Navy vessel attends the regatta as guard ship. In 2008, HMS Argyll (a type 23 frigate) performed the task, following on from her sister ship HMS Somerset the previous year. The regatta has also had visits from the navies of Belgium, France and Argentina (ARA Libertad), among others. The guard ship is open to the public during the regatta, and the crew traditionally take part in a large number of regatta events.

=== Street Market ===
During the Regatta, the road along the river front is closed to allow the Regatta street market (known previously as the "Cheap Jacks") to set up in front of the Royal Avenue Gardens. The market is open only on the Wednesday to Saturday of Regatta week.

There is also a craft market in The Old Market place.

=== Steamboat rally ===
Usually, a rally of steam powered vessels, all available for inspection throughout the regatta, is organised in conjunction with the Steam Boat Association of Great Britain. They, with other classic craft, also participate in a review, proceeding down river with a commentary detailing their history.

=== Children's events ===
Pavement artists, crab fishing, ice cream eating competitions and fancy dress competitions all feature.

=== Other events ===
There are numerous other events including:

- Barrel rolling races
- Waiters and Waitresses races
- The International Trolley Race Grand Prix
- Bungee rowing
- Spot the Oddity
- A waterborne tug of war (two boats secured together by a rope at the stern with the teams rowing against each other)
- Water Polo

=== Fireworks ===
There is a fireworks display on the Saturday nights.

=== Music ===
Throughout the week there are free public performances in the bandstand in the Royal Avenue Gardens, commencing in the morning and running to 1030pm or later.

There are also music and organ recitals in the local churches throughout the Regatta week.
