= Bac du Sauvage =

Cable ferry in France

Coordinates: 43.4864°N 4.383631°E

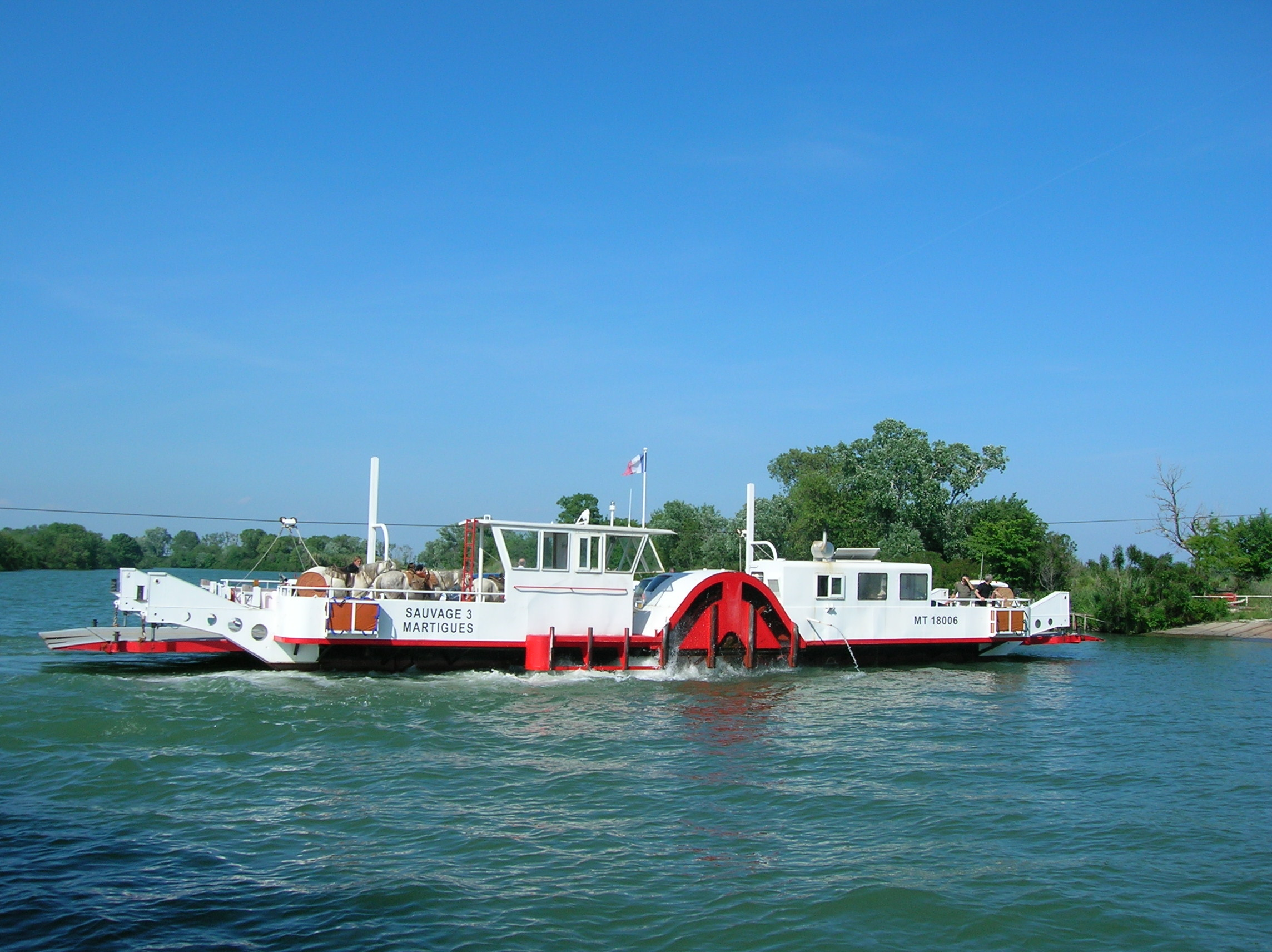
The Bac du Sauvage Ferry underway

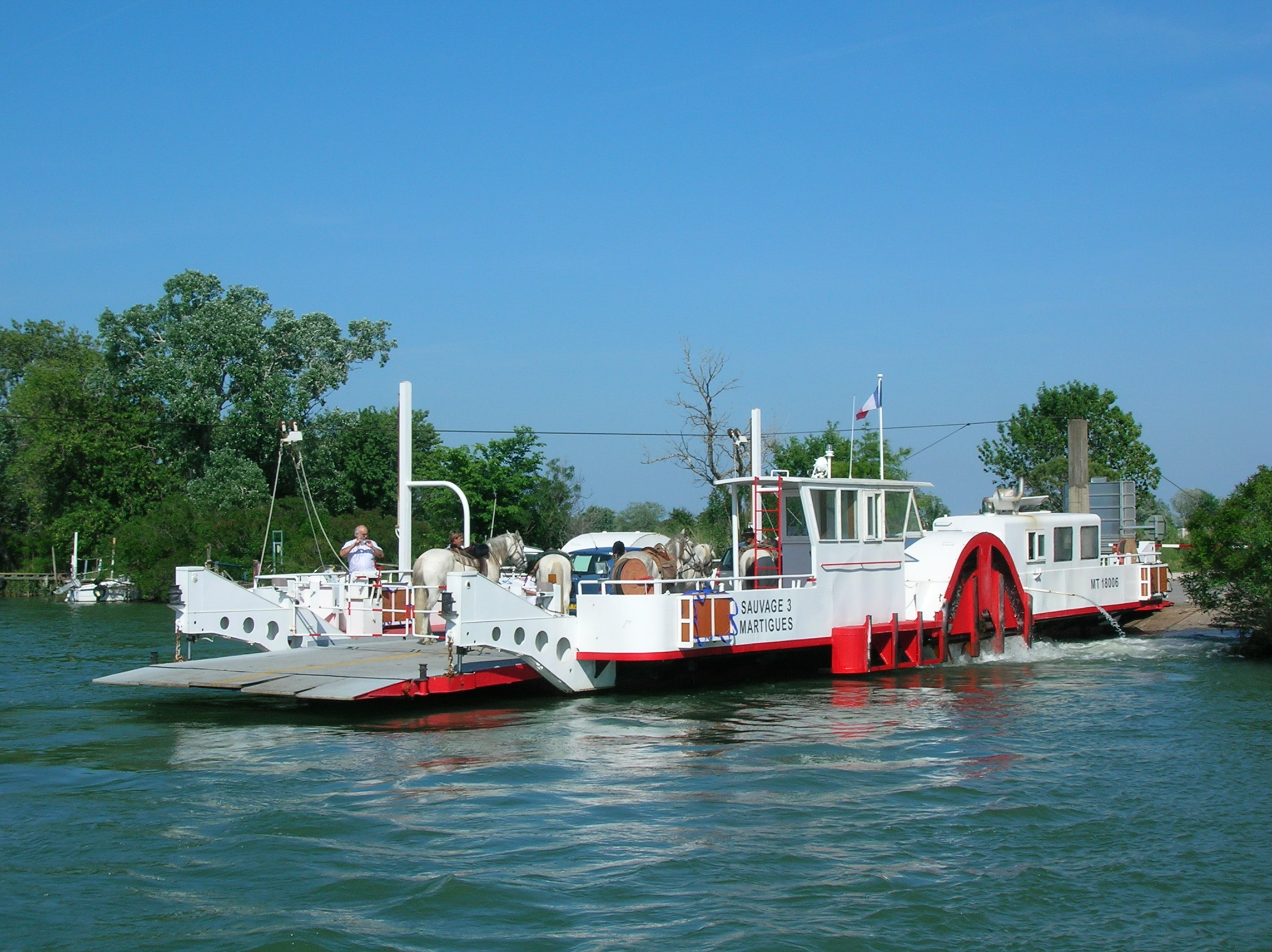
The Bac du Sauvage Ferry at its slip; note horses on board

The Bac du Sauvage or Sauvage Ferry; (Occitan: Bac del Salvatge) is a cable ferry across a branch of the Rhône in the Camargue region of southern France. The crossing is 230 metres (750 ft) long and carries a road across the Petit Rhône about 6.5 kilometres (4.0 mi) from Saintes-Maries-de-la-Mer and a similar distance upriver from the Mediterranean Sea. The ferry crossing is located on the territory of the commune of Saintes-Maries-de-la-Mer.

Between October and March, the ferry operates from 0700 to 1200 and from 1330 to 1830. Between April and September, the hours are 0600 to 1200 and 1330 to 2000. The ferry operates every 30 minutes, increasing to every 10 or 15 minutes if traffic volumes demand it. The ferry is operated by the Syndicat Mixte des Traversées du Delta du Rhône, which also operates the Bac de Barcarin, and is free of tolls.

The current ferry boat, Bac Sauvage 3, was placed in service in 1972, and can carry up to 8 cars with 30 passengers plus a crew member. The boat is 28 metres (92 ft) long and 5 metres (16 ft) wide. Whilst guided by cables, the ferry is propelled by paddle wheels. This unusual arrangement was shared with the Number 7 Dartmouth Higher Ferry in England. This operated from 1960 to June 2009, but has now been replaced by a new, more conventional cable ferry.

Besides carrying cars, the ferry is often used by horse riding tours of the area.
