= Dartmouth Castle =

Medieval artillery fort in Dartmouth, UK

- Dartmouth, Devon, England
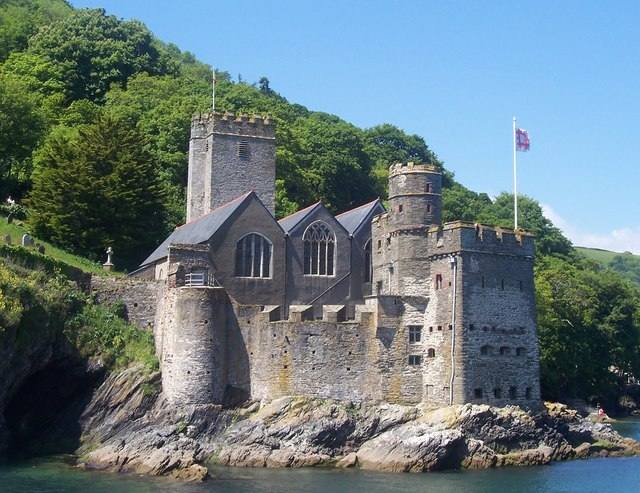
- Dartmouth Castle, showing the 15th-century gun positions and St Petroc's Church

Site information
- Type: Artillery fort
- Owner: English Heritage
- Open to the public: Yes

Location
- Shown within Devon
- Location within Devon
- Coordinates: 50.34203°N 3.56829°W
- Grid reference: grid reference SX885503

Site history
- Materials: Limestone, slate
- Events: English Civil War, World War II

Dartmouth Castle is an artillery fort, built to protect Dartmouth harbour in Devon, England. The earliest parts of the castle date from the 1380s, when, in response to the threat of a French attack, the civic authorities created a small enclosure castle overlooking the mouth of the Dart estuary. This was intended to engage enemy ships with catapults and possibly early cannon, and incorporated the local chapel of Saint Petroc within its walls. At the end of the 15th century, the castle was expanded with an artillery tower and an iron chain which could be stretched across the harbour to a tower at Godmerock; this addition formed the oldest known purpose-built coast artillery fort in Britain. Further gun batteries were added during the French invasion scare of the 1540s.

The castle saw service during the English Civil War of 1642 to 1646, during which its vulnerability to attack from the land became apparent, resulting in the Gallants Bower defensive work above it being used to provide additional protection. In 1748, a new gun position called the Grand Battery was added to the castle, equipped with twelve guns. After years of neglect in the early 19th century, the castle was upgraded in 1859 with modern artillery, but defending the port of Dartmouth was no longer a military priority. By the early years of the 20th century the castle was considered redundant by the authorities, who opened it to visitors. It was brought back into use during the Second World War, but in 1955 it was finally retired from service. In the 21st century, it is managed by English Heritage and the castle received 37,940 visitors in 2007.

== History ==
=== 14th–15th centuries ===
Dartmouth Castle was built to protect the coastal town of Dartmouth in Devon. By the 12th century, the town's harbour, located in the estuary of the River Dart, was an important trading and fishing port, able to hold up to 600 vessels. It also had a reputation as a centre for both piracy and privateering, particularly for its attacks on French shipping. By the 1370s, during the Hundred Years War, Dartmouth was a key target for the French navy and the Crown repeatedly advised the town to improve its defences. Nothing was done, however, until in 1388 John Hawley, the mayor of Dartmouth and a privateer, was authorised by Richard II to raise funds from the town for a new "fortalice by the sea" to defend the harbour.

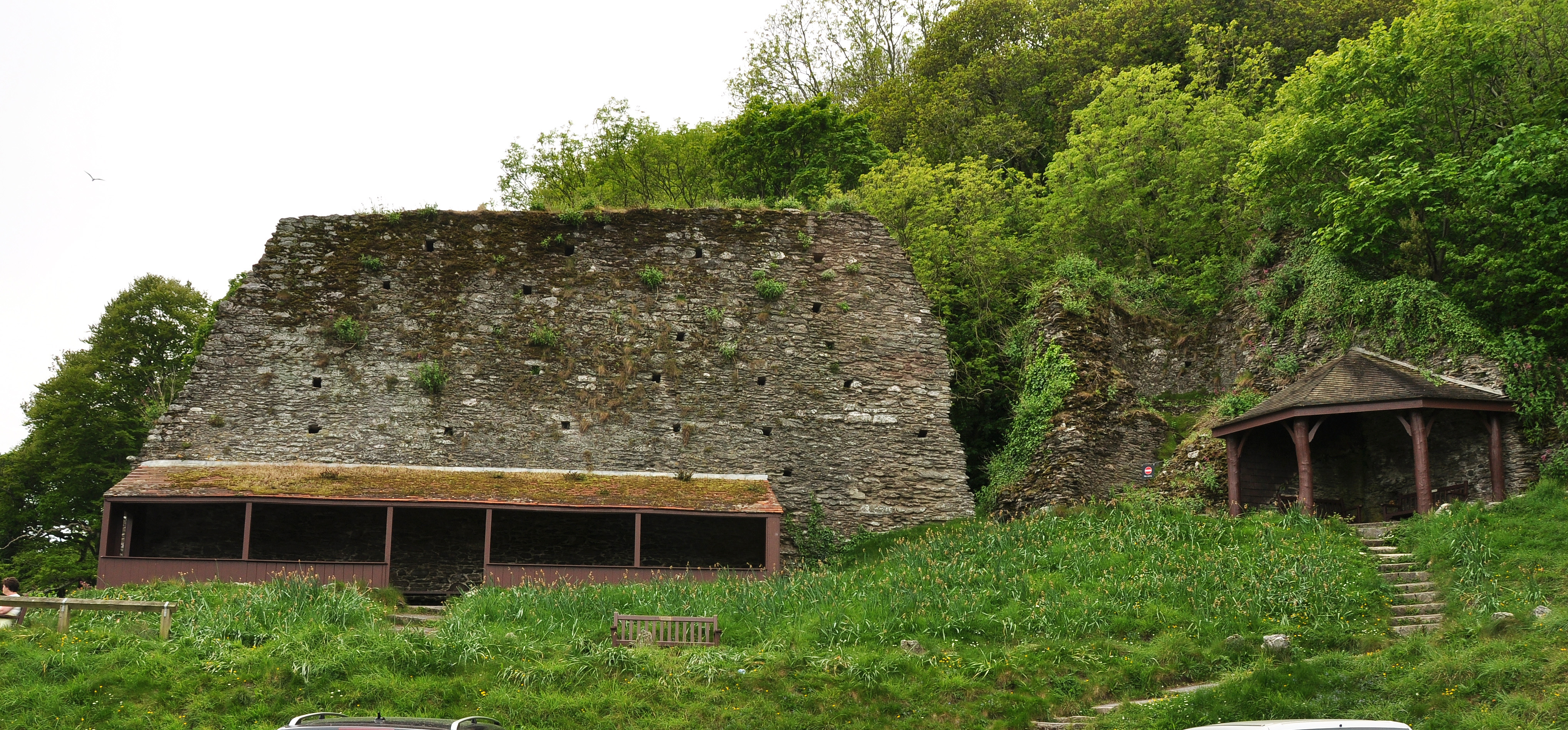
Remains of the fortalice wall

The fortalice, or small fort, took the form of an enclosure castle, with a curtain wall protected by mural towers and a gate tower. It was constructed on land in the manor of Stoke Fleming, belonging to the Carew family, lent by them due to the threat of French attack, and was built around a pre-existing chapel to Saint Petroc on the site. It held catapults to attack enemy ships, and may also have been armed with early cannon and equipped with a chain to block the entrance to the harbour. It did not see active service, but may have deterred the original plans of the French and Breton attack force in 1404, which, under the command of Tanneguy du Chastel, landed at Slapton Sands instead, where they were then dispersed by the local militia. The Carew family subsequently built a family house in an inside corner of the fortalice.

In 1481, Henry VII entered into fresh discussions with the town about the defences. In 1462, the Crown had agreed to pay Dartmouth £30 a year to maintain a chain across the harbour for twenty years, and the town were probably keen to extend this profitable arrangement before it expired. (Note: It is difficult to accurately compare 15th-century and modern prices or incomes. £30 in 1462 could equate to between £177,000 and £11 million in 2015 terms, depending on the measure used; £150 in 1481 could equate to between £965,000 and £60 million.) Henry agreed to pay £150 over five years for the construction of a new artillery tower, with an annual subsidy of £30 towards the maintenance costs, later increased to £40 a year. The new tower was placed alongside the old fortalice, using stone from Cornworthy and Kingsbridge and a team of up to 12 stonemasons. The project dragged on until fears of a French invasion grew in 1486; two "great murderer" guns were installed and by 1492 there were four murderer and twelve serpentine guns installed there. The tower was finally completed in 1495, with a protective chain linking to the other side of the river supported by small boats called "cobbellys", where it was protected by a tower at Godmerock. Another castle, Kingswear, was also built by Dartmouth, on the opposite side of the estuary.

=== 16th–18th centuries ===
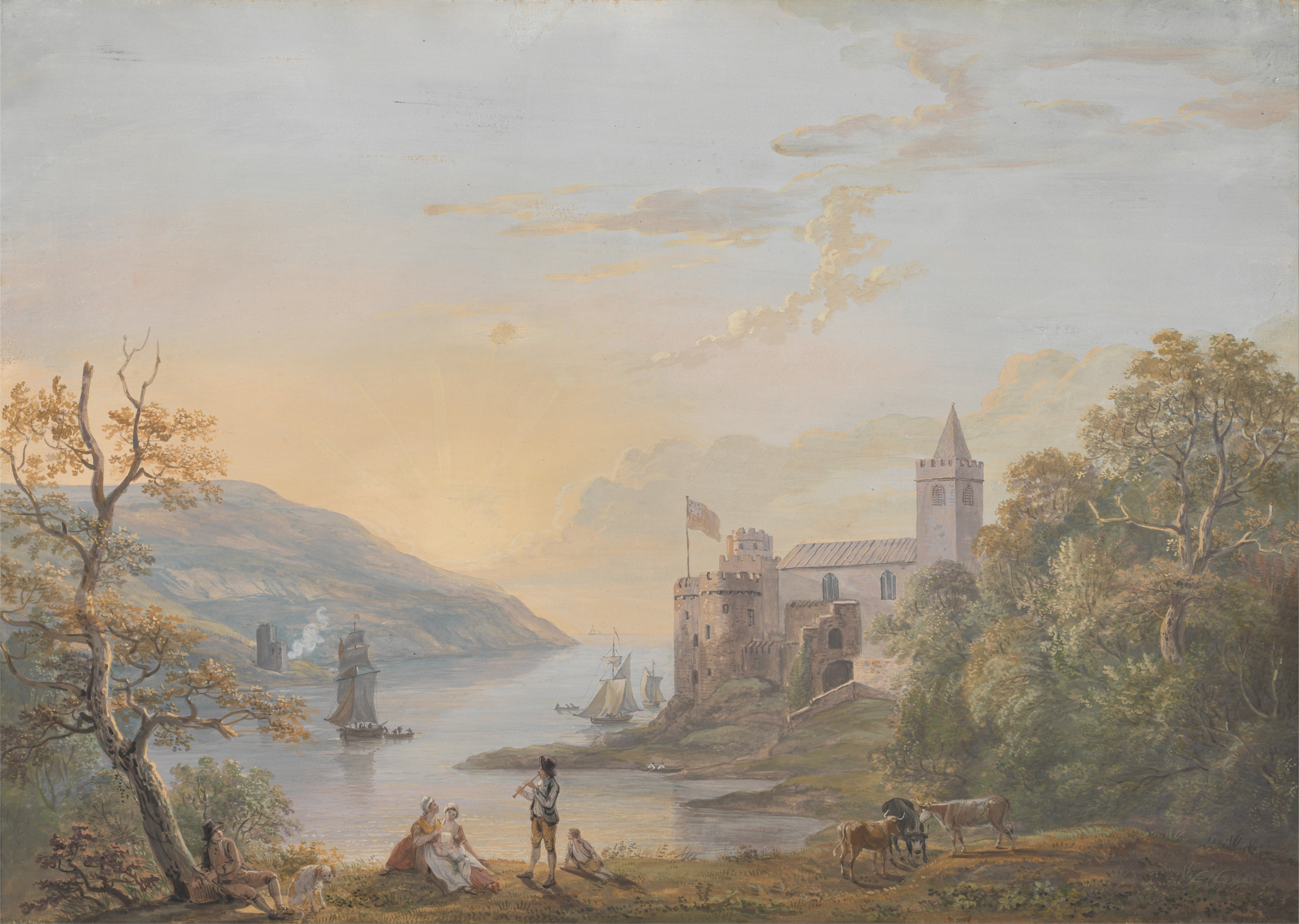
A depiction of the castle in 1794, by Paul Sandby

In 1543, Henry VIII allied himself with Spain in a war against France. Despite Henry's initial successes, France and Spain made peace in 1544, leaving England exposed to a French invasion, backed by her allies in Scotland. In response, Henry issued an instruction to improve the country's defences, particularly along the south coast. Dartmouth Castle was reinforced by three new gun batteries, one on each side of the gun tower, and another, Lamberd's Bulwarke, positioned in the south-east corner of the fortalice.

Sir Peter Carew, a soldier and the local Member of Parliament for Dartmouth, opposed this final addition, arguing that it trespassed on the family's house within the castle. He seized the castle and threw out the town's officers. A law case followed, and in 1554 the town regained the property after Carew fled the county facing charges of treachery; he returned in 1556 and retook the castle. Eventually a reprieve was agreed under which the town regained control of the fortifications and the Carews continued to occupy the house.

In 1597, with the threat of a Spanish invasion, the gun tower was improved and Lamberd's Bulwarke repaired. Two years later, Hortensio Spinola, a Spanish spy, described the castle as being defended "with 24 pieces and 50 men", commenting that the harbour was well protected and that the inhabitants were "warlike".

At the outbreak of the English Civil War in 1642 between the supporters of Charles I and those of Parliament, Dartmouth initially sided with Parliament and the castle was guarded by five men. In 1643, Prince Maurice besieged the town and the castle was overcome by artillery positioned on the higher ground of the overlooking hill behind it. An earthwork fort, called Gallants Bower, may subsequently have been built to protect this vulnerable position; an alternative explanation is that the fort was first built in 1627 and was simply brought back into use during the conflict. In January 1646, Sir Thomas Fairfax led a Parliamentary army to retake Dartmouth. He first took the town, then Gallants Bower, before forcing the surrender of Sir Hugh Pollard, the castle's commander, the following day. The Carews' house was probably badly damaged during the attack.

During the Interregnum, Gallants Bower was decommissioned but the castle itself remained in use; the Carews' house was pulled down. A governor, Sir John Fowell, was appointed to run the castle and the local defences, and to prevent smuggling. Charles II was restored to the throne in 1660 and initially granted Dartmouth Castle, and the former annual subsidy, to the town once again. By 1662, however, the fortifications in Dartmouth were garrisoned by a royal force of 23 men and Sir John, who continued in his post as captain and governor until 1677. Fears of a Dutch and French attack resulted in the castle being maintained until the 1690s.

The castle was neglected at the start of the 18th century, and a survey in 1715 reported that it was in a "ruinous condition" and that none of its artillery had been adequately maintained. A renewed threat from France prompted fresh work: in 1741, Lamberd's Bulwarke was strengthened, and in 1748 the government then renamed the bulwark the Grand Battery, transforming it into a two-tiered platform armed with twelve guns. The older parts of the castle were retained by the town and used primarily for accommodation and storage. The port of Dartmouth began to decline in importance, however, with nearby Plymouth taking over much of its former trade.

=== 19th–21st centuries ===
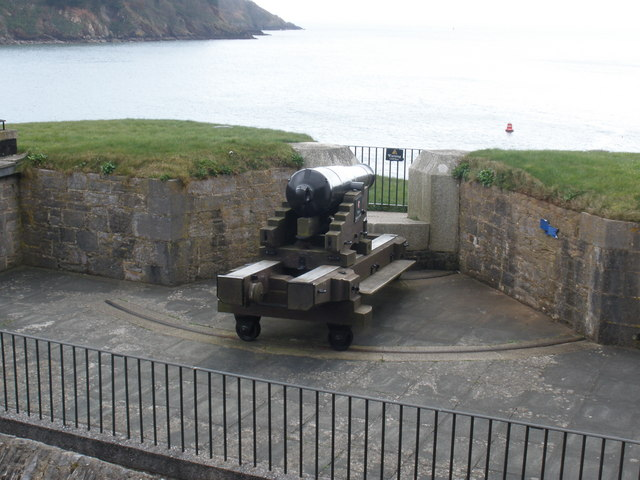
Traversing 19th-century artillery gun on the Old Battery roof

Dartmouth Castle was garrisoned during the Napoleonic Wars by the volunteer Dartmouth Artillery unit, but saw no active service. At the end of the conflict, the castle's guns were reduced in number and the garrison cut back to a single, caretaker gunner. In 1820, there were only two serviceable guns and, in 1847, the writer Clarkson Stanfield observed that the castle, while picturesque, was "not spacious, and mounts but a few guns".

The introduction of shell guns and steam ships during the 1840s created a new risk that the French might successfully attack along the south coast, and fears grew of a conflict in the early 1850s. Further worries about France, combined with the development of rifled cannon and iron-clad warships, led to the Royal Commission on the Defence of the United Kingdom being established in 1859, and expressing fears about the security of the south coast. As a result, the Grand Battery at Dartmouth Castle was rebuilt and retitled the Dartmouth Point Battery, with shell-proof, granite defences protecting three traversing gun emplacements for 68-pounder guns looking out to sea, and two 10-inch 86 cwt. guns on the roof; one small 8-inch howitzer protected the entrance to the harbour itself. It was manned by three professional soldiers, and a team of over fifty-five reservists, drawn from the newly formed Sixth Devonshire Artillery Volunteer Corps. The castle, however, was of low military priority, only of importance because the harbour might be used to as a staging post to attack Plymouth, and the guns allocated it were old-fashioned. A further upgrade in 1888 again installed only out-dated artillery pieces.

By 1909, the bulk of the castle was considered obsolete and the War Office transferred it to the Office of Works, who carried out restoration work and opened it to visitors. It reentered service during the Second World War, when it was rearmed with two 4.7-inch (11.9 cm) quick-firing guns, dating from the First World War and housed in concrete gun houses, to protect merchant convoys and the Philips' shipyard. The castle was manned by members of the British Army; officers lived in a nearby cottage, non-commissioned officers in the castle itself, and other ranks in the 19th century fortifications, and later in temporary Nissen huts.

In 1955, the castle was transferred back to the Ministry of Works and repaired; the Dartmouth Point Battery, by now known as the Old Battery, was leased back to the town for use as a restaurant; and the site was reopened to the public. In the 21st century it is managed by English Heritage, with the Grand Battery displayed as it would have appeared in the 19th century; it received 37,940 visitors in 2007. The 14th-century gun tower is protected under UK law as a Grade I listed building, the 19th-century gun battery as a Grade II* listed building.

== Architecture ==
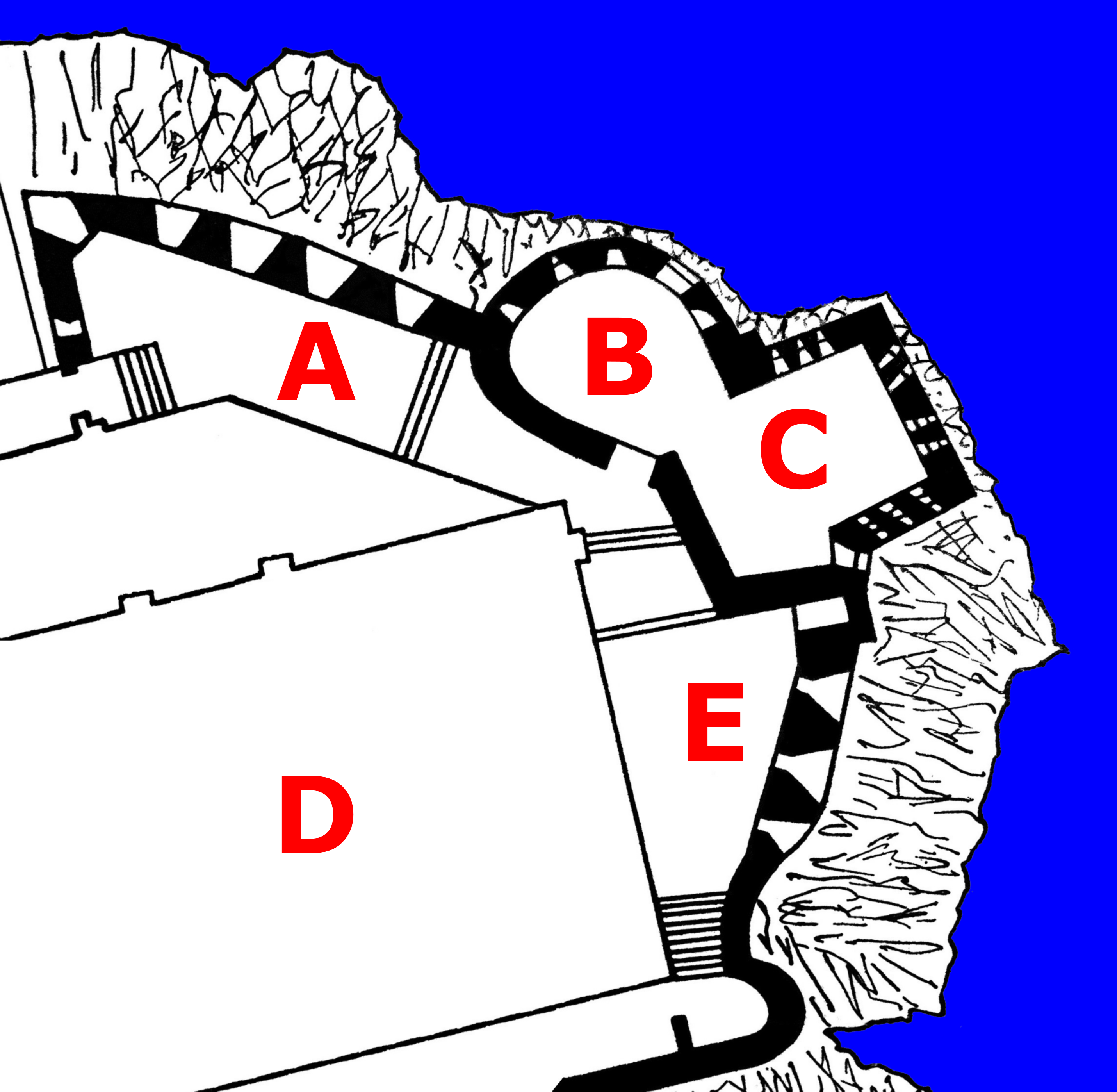
Plan of the north part of the castle site: A – north gun platform; B – gun tower (harbour chain); C – gun tower (guns); D – Saint Petrox Church; E – south gun platform

Dartmouth Castle occupies a rocky outcrop, overlooking the entrance to Dartmouth harbour. On the north side of the site is the main gun tower, looking out across the River Dart, and Saint Petrox Church; to the south-east is the Old Battery, facing out to sea. In the south-west corner are the remains of the original fortalice defences, consisting of a corner tower, part of the moat and parts of the wall, 7 feet 6 inches (2.29 m) thick and up to 23 feet (7.0 m) high.

The gun tower dates from the end of the end of the 15th century, and is the oldest known purpose-built coast artillery fort in Britain. The tower is three storeys tall, with a semi-circular section made from limestone rubble that contained the mechanisms for the harbour chain, and a square section built from slate which contained the guns. Each level has two main rooms with a circular and rectangular shape respectively – this design was probably the result of changes in the plan during the construction work. Originally the basement held the castle's artillery guns, which had primitive gun-ports, originally protected from the sea by wooden shutters. The ground floor rooms would have formed offices and living space for the garrison, in addition to containing the chain room, with a pulley and capstan for raising the chain defence. The first floor was used for accommodation and was fitted with an oven. Gunloops for handguns ran around both the basement, the ground floor, and the first floor for close defence. Lighter artillery would have been positioned on the roof, where the battlements were raised in height after the castle was first built to deal with the threat posed by musket fire from the higher ground behind the castle. An 18 feet (5.5 m) high turret rises above the roof level.

The main gun tower is flanked by two mid-16th century gun platforms, altered in the 18th century to house newer forms of artillery. Just behind the gun tower is Saint Petrox Church, a three-aisled building which dates in its current form to 1641, with some alterations resulting from its restoration in 1833.

Old Battery dates from 1861, when it was called the Dartmouth Point Battery, and occupies the former site of the Grand Battery and Lamberd's Bulwarke. On the north-east side of the complex is a guard room, which lay above the magazines. It was protected from attack from the landward side with a ditch, rifle-loops and murder-holes. In the main part of the battery, there are three vaulted casemates to hold traversing heavy guns pointing out to sea, with a smaller gun position covering the harbour entrance; a further two heavy guns would have been positioned on the roof. A white concrete building, originally a coastal gun position disguised as a medieval turret, now acts as a ticket office. Behind the Old Battery complex is a 19th-century tower that functioned as a lighthouse between 1856 and 1886.

== In art and literature ==
Letitia Elizabeth Landon's poetical illustration, Dartmouth Castle, in Fisher's Drawing Room Scrap Book, 1833, accompanies an engraving of a painting by Thomas Allom showing the Castle and Harbour. This poem reflects how what had been a bastion of war has now become a holiday destination.

== See also ==
- Castles in Great Britain and Ireland
- List of castles in England

== Bibliography ==
- Brooks, Stephen (1996). Southsea Castle. Andover, UK: Pitkin Guides. ISBN 0-85372-809-7.
- Coad, J. G. (1985). "Hurst Castle: The Evolution of a Tudor Fortress 1790–1945". Post-Medieval Archaeology. 19: 63–104. doi:10.1179/pma.1985.005.
- Davison, Brian K. (2000). Dartmouth Castle, Devon. London, UK: English Heritage. ISBN 1-85074-759-8.
- Hale, J. R. (1983). Renaissance War Studies. London, UK: Hambledon Press. ISBN 0-907628-17-6.
- Harrington, Peter (2007). The Castles of Henry VIII. Oxford, UK: Osprey Publishing. ISBN 978-1-4728-0380-1.
- O'Neil, B. H. St. John (1936). "Dartmouth Castle and Other Defences of Dartmouth Haven". Archaeologia. 85: 129–159. doi:10.1017/S0261340900015186.
- Pattison, Paul (2009). Pendennis Castle and St Mawes Castle. London, UK: English Heritage. ISBN 978-1-85074-723-9.
- Stanfield, Clarkson (1847). Stanfield's Coast Scenery: A Series of Picturesque Views in the British Channel and on the Coast of France (2nd ed.). London, UK: Smith, Elder and Co. OCLC 55157203.
