= Dartmouth Higher Ferry =

Vehicular cable ferry in Devon, England

Coordinates: 50.358°N 3.575°W

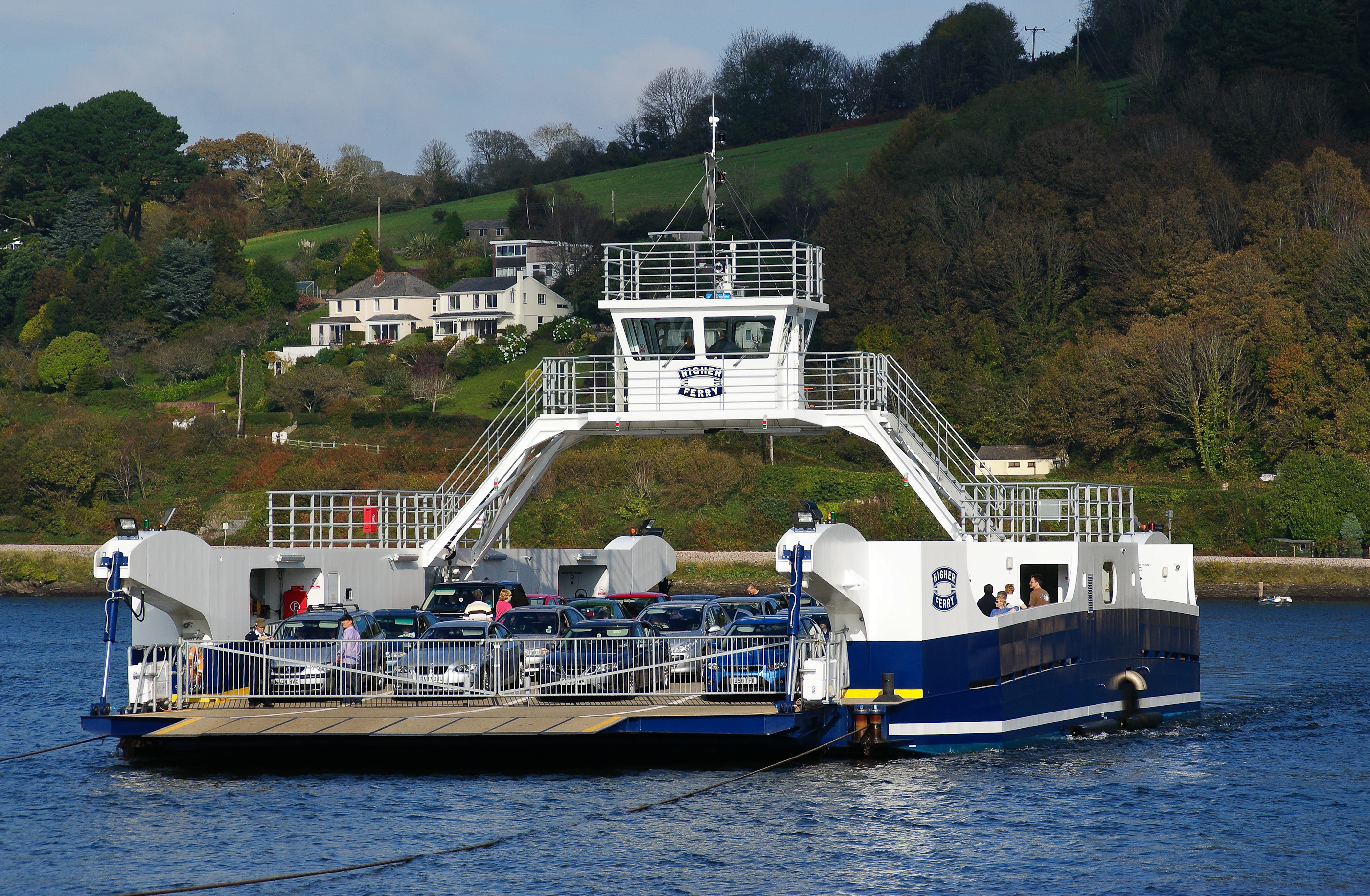
Current ferry

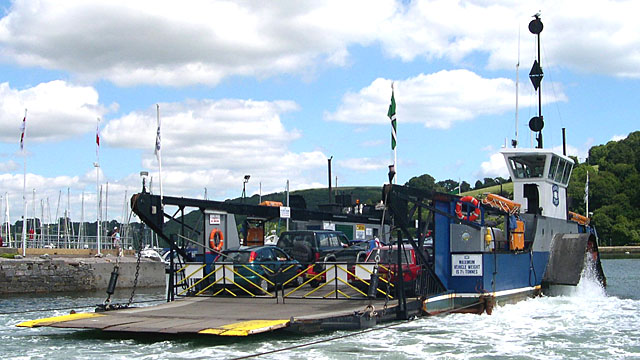
Previous Dartmouth Higher Ferry

The Dartmouth Higher Ferry, also known as the Dartmouth–Kingswear Floating Bridge, is a vehicular and passenger cable ferry, which crosses the River Dart in the English county of Devon. It is one of three ferries that cross the tidal river from Dartmouth to Kingswear, the others being the Lower Ferry and the Passenger Ferry.

Unlike the Lower Ferry, which operates from slips in the centres of both Dartmouth and Kingswear, the Higher Ferry crosses to the north. In doing so, it allows the A379 road between Kingsbridge and Torbay to bypass the narrow streets in the centre of Kingswear and Dartmouth.

The eastern ferry slip of the Higher Ferry is immediately adjacent to the Britannia Crossing, a level crossing across the Paignton and Dartmouth Steam Railway. All vehicles entering or leaving the ferry must cross this crossing.

The ferry is owned and operated by the Dartmouth–Kingswear Floating Bridge Company, and a toll is charged. The previous ferry boat, named No. 7, was built in 1960 and could carry up to 18 cars. Unusually, although it used cables for guidance, it was actually propelled by paddle wheels, a characteristic it shared with the Bac du Sauvage in France.

Early in 2008, the Dartmouth–Kingswear Floating Bridge Company signed a contract for the construction of a replacement ferry. This ferry, which can carry up to 36 cars, came into service in late June 2009. Unlike the previous ferry, the new ferry is a more conventional cable ferry, using the cables for propulsion as well as guidance. However, it is also provided with four thrusters, one positioned at each corner, in order to provide additional manoeuvrability when operating in strong winds and tidal conditions.

== History ==
Dartmouth Floating Bridge Act 1830
- Act of Parliament
- Parliament of the United Kingdom
- Long title: An Act for establishing a floating Bridge over the Harbour of Dartmouth, from or near to Lower Sand Quay Point to Old Rock, in the County of Devon; and for building Quays and Landing Places, and for making Roads and Approaches thereto, with Branches therefrom.
- Citation: 11 Geo. 4 & 1 Will. 4. c. cxxvii

Dates
- Royal assent: 17 June 1830

Text of statute as originally enacted

The Floating Bridge was authorised the Dartmouth Floating Bridge Act 1830 (11 Geo. 4 & 1 Will. 4. c. cxxvii). Because it was making a loss it was suspended in 1855 but reinstated the following year with a new ferry. It was steam powered from 1831 to 1835 but then worked by hand or horses until 1867 when a steam engine again powered the ferry. It was closed again in 1874 and reopened in 1876 with a new ferry.

On 13 February 2005 the weather and other conditions caused the guide cables on No.7 to come loose, and the ferry, loaded with 15 cars and 34 passengers, to drift towards the sea. The crew managed to moor it to a buoy before it could collide with other vessels or run aground.

== See also ==
- Dartmouth Lower Ferry
- Dartmouth Passenger Ferry
