= Dartmouth Passenger Ferry =

Coordinates: 50.3496°N 3.575191°W

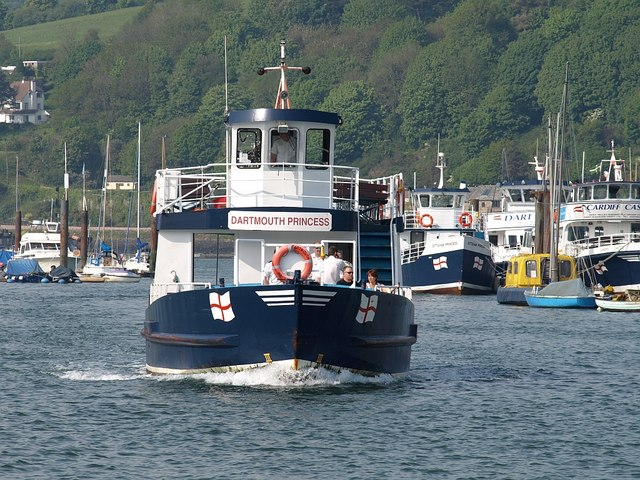
The Dartmouth Passenger Ferry. Sister ships in the River Link fleet can be seen moored to the right.

The Dartmouth Passenger Ferry, also known as the Dartmouth Steam Railway and Riverboat Company, is a passenger ferry that crosses the River Dart in the English county of Devon. It is one of three ferries that cross the tidal river from Dartmouth to Kingswear, the others being the Higher Ferry and the Lower Ferry. The 630-mile (1,010 km) long South West Coast Path crosses the Dart on either the Lower or Passenger ferries.

The passenger ferry is operated by River Link, which is owned by Dart Valley Railway plc, the owner of the Dartmouth Steam Railway. The ferry connects the Dartmouth water front to the steam railway's terminus at Kingswear railway station. At one time adjacent to the Dartmouth landing of the ferry was the unique Dartmouth railway station, but this has been converted into a restaurant and the ferry now shares an adjacent landing stage with cruise boats also operated by Dart Pleasure Craft.

== History ==
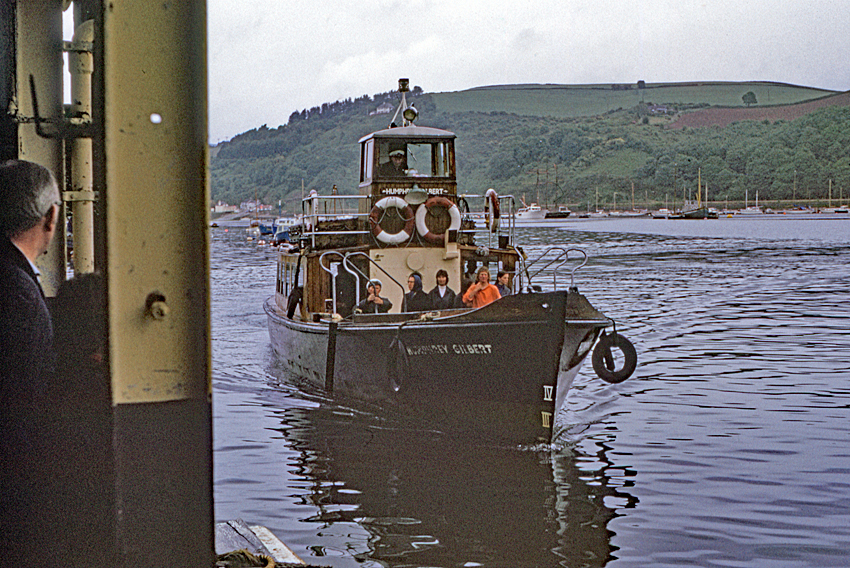
MV Humphrey Gilbert approaching Dartmouth Riverside station in 1973

There are records of a "Kingswear Ferry" as early as 1365. By the 18th century, a second ferry was sailing from Hoodown on the Kingswear side, upstream from Waterhead Creek, which had an easier approach than the steep slipway in the village square.

The Dartmouth and Torbay Railway was authorised by its Act of Parliament, the Dartmouth and Torbay Railway Act 1857 (20 & 21 Vict. c. ciii) to establish a steam ferry across the Dart from its station and agreed to purchase the ferries, although this was not completed until 18 November 1873, by which time the railway was a part of the South Devon Railway. Within three years it had become part of the Great Western Railway who continued to operate the steam ferry up until nationalisation into British Railways on 1 January 1948.

The operation was leased to the Dartmouth Steam Packet Company until 1872. The company's first steam ferry was the paddle steamer Perseverance that took up duties on 1 October 1864, and so it had operated with their cruising steamers Louisa (built 1856) and Newcomin (built 1864). The latter was named after local pioneer steam engineer Thomas Newcomen. The Perseverance was not successful and was replaced by a new paddle steamer, the PS Dolphin, in 1869. The railway took over the operation in 1872 and continued to operate the Dolphin.

A new twin-screw steamer The Mew replaced the paddle steamer on 31 May 1908. She was altered in 1924 to be able to carry the Great Western Railway's road vehicles so as to avoid the heavy payments made for the use of the Lower Ferry. In 1940 she steamed to Dover to take part in the Dunkirk evacuation but was deemed unsuitable for the task and sent back to Dartmouth. She was finally withdrawn on 8 October 1954.

A temporary ferry, the Lady Elizabeth, was on station until the two replacement ferries, the Adrian Gilbert and Humphrey Gilbert that were built by MW Blackmore & Sons, Bideford, entered service on 18 March 1957. In 1972 the ferry was sold to Dartmouth Borough Council. After a short time being operated by its successor, the South Hams District Council, it was sold to Dart Pleasure Craft Limited, who now trade as River Link.

== See also ==
- Dartmouth Higher Ferry
- Dartmouth Lower Ferry
