= Dartmouth Lower Ferry =

Ferry service in Devon, England

Coordinates: 50.3486°N 3.5752°W

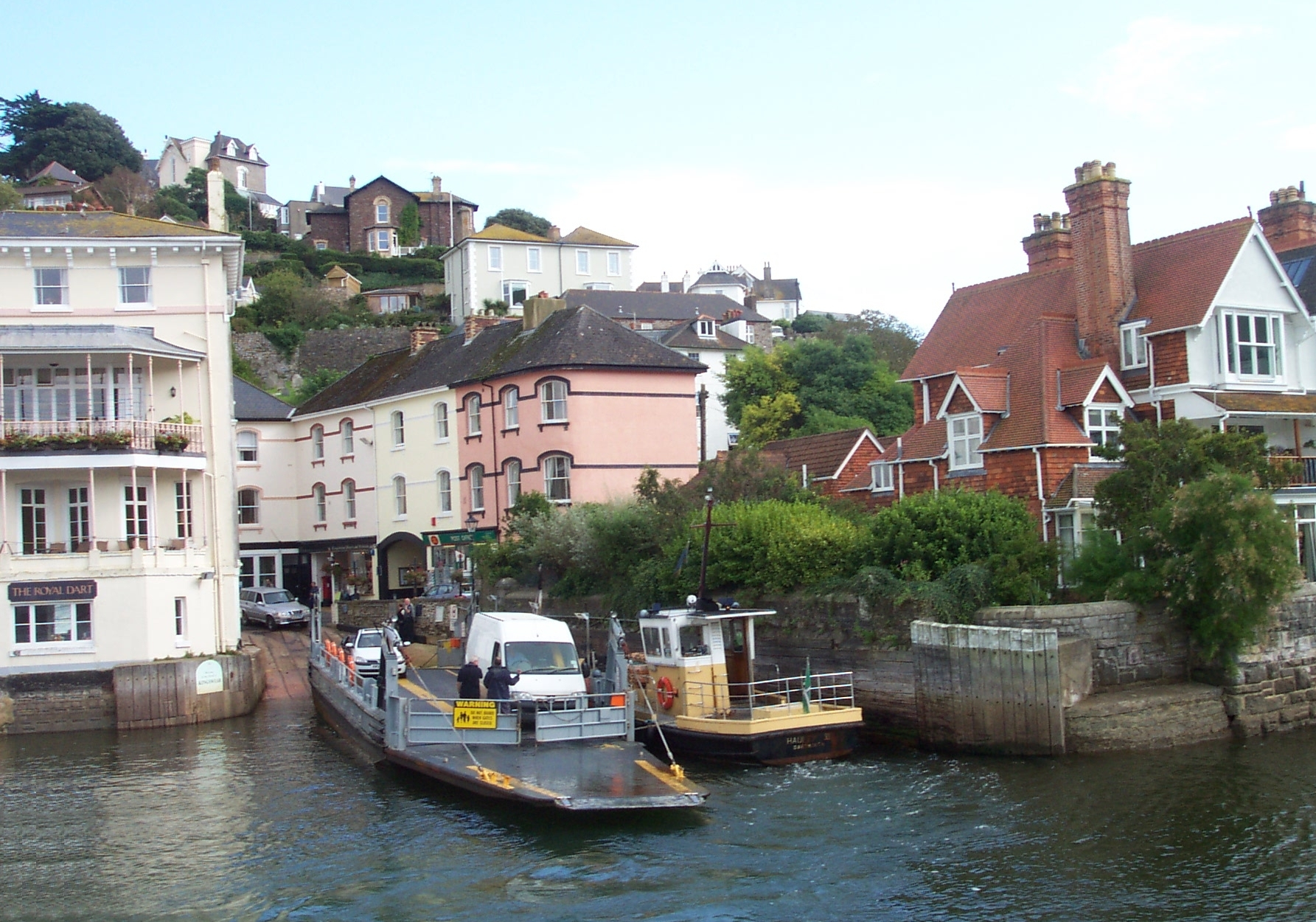
The Dartmouth Lower Ferry at its Kingswear slip

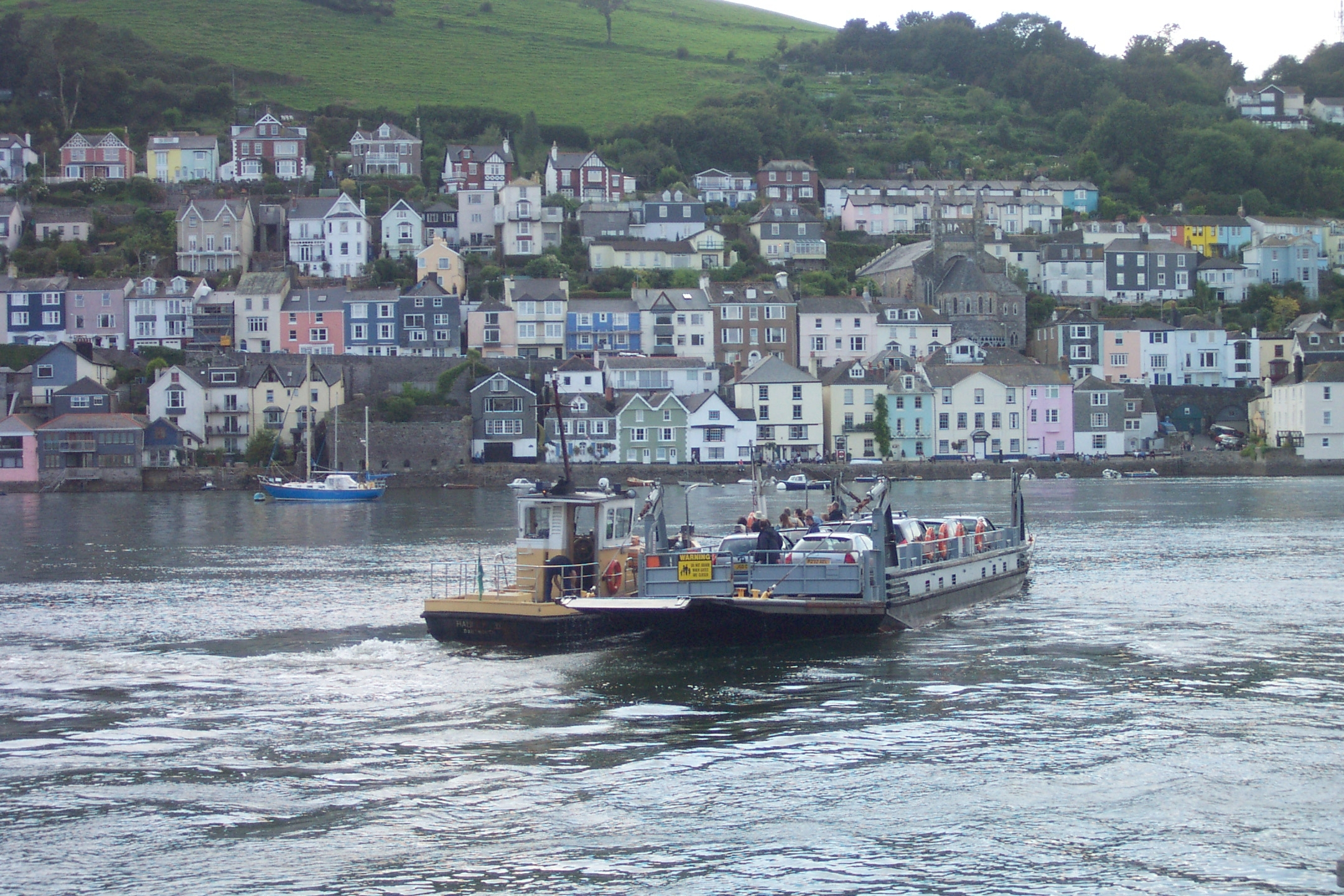
The Dartmouth Lower Ferry crossing towards Dartmouth (in background)

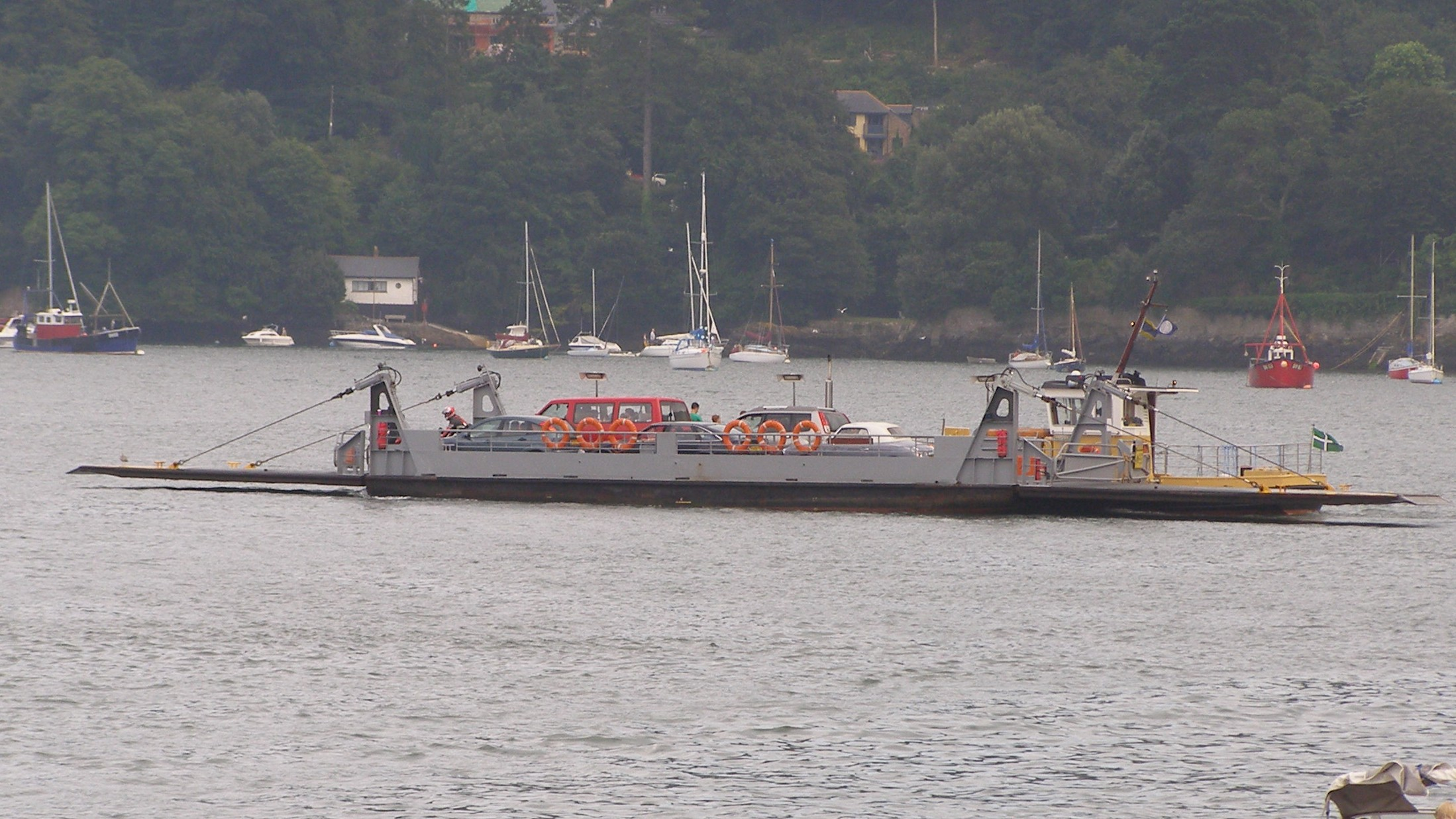
2006

The Dartmouth Lower Ferry is a vehicular and passenger ferry which crosses the River Dart in the English county of Devon. It is one of three ferries that cross the tidal river from Dartmouth to Kingswear, the others being the Higher Ferry and the Passenger Ferry. The 630-mile (1,010 km) long South West Coast Path crosses the Dart on either the Lower or Passenger ferries.

Unlike the Higher Ferry, which operates somewhat to the north of the centres of Dartmouth and Kingswear, the Lower Ferry operates from slips directly in the centre of both places. This is more convenient for local traffic, but means the traffic must negotiate the narrow streets of Kingswear village.

The ferry is owned and operated by the South Hams District Council. It is operated by unpowered ferry pontoons, carrying up to 8 cars each. Each ferry pontoon is pushed and pulled by a tug boat and, when traffic demands, two such ferry/tug combinations are used in service at the same time.

On 30 May 2012 one pontoon and tug was deployed as the venue for an unusual Diamond Jubilee street party.

== History ==
There are records of a "Kingswear Ferry" as early as 1365. By the 18th century, a second ferry was sailing from Hoodown on the Kingswear side, upstream from Waterhead Creek, which had an easier approach than the steep slipway in the village square. The Dartmouth and Torbay Railway was authorised by its 1857 Act of Parliament to establish a steam ferry across the Dart from its station and agreed to purchase the ferries, although the Hoodown Ferry was discontinued in 1864 after the opening of the railway. The remaining Kingswear Ferry was leased out by the railway to a succession of local operators.

In addition to the rowing boat that operated from Kingswear, a "horse boat" was operated that could convey a horse and cart. A steam ferry supplemented the rowed ferry in April 1867, and this could tow the horse boat when required. A new steam ferry, the Forester, was brought into use in 1878. The rowing boat finally ceased operation in 1915 when the Relief was introduced.

In 1925 the railway, by then the Great Western Railway, sold the ferry rights for a nominal sum to Dartmouth Borough Council. After a brief hiatus the ferry operation was leased to a partnership "Peters & Heselton", who assigned this to the General Estates Company in 1932. After World War II the company did not wish to continue and from 1946 the ferry was run directly by the Council (South Hams District from 1974).

== See also ==
- Dartmouth Higher Ferry
- Dartmouth Passenger Ferry
