= Sharkham Point Iron Mine =

Iron Mine near Brixham, Devon, England

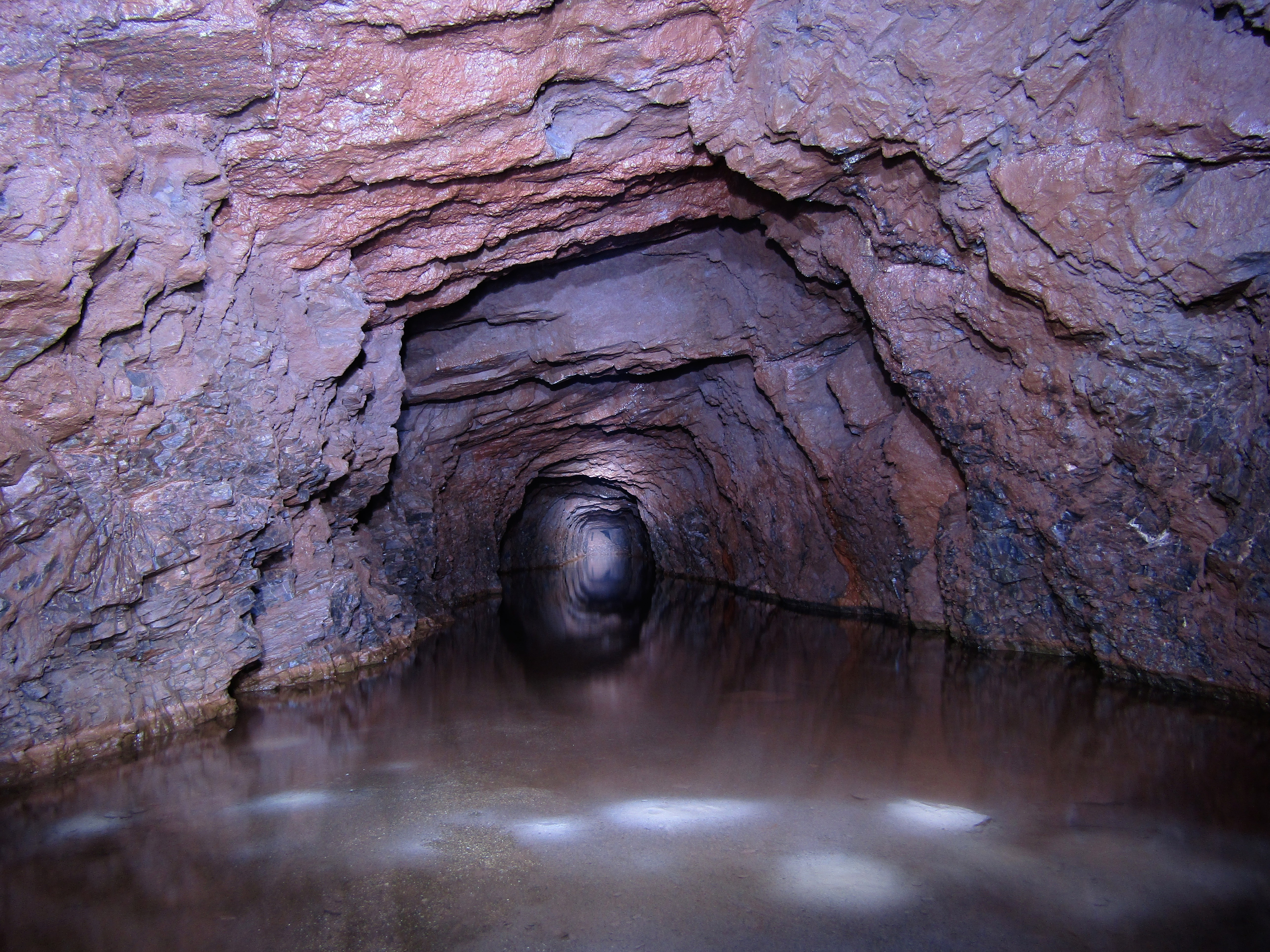
- View within an adit of the mine

- Shown within Devon
- Location: Sharkham Point, Devon, England; 50.3817°N 3.4979°W
- Products: Hematite
- Type: Opencast and underground
- Opened: c. 1790
- Closed: 1914

Sharkham Point Iron Mine was an iron mine at Sharkham Point, near the town of Brixham in Devon. The mine was worked for around 125 years and employed at its peak 100 workers. It was primarily an open cast mine, but five shafts and six adits are also mentioned in reports of the site. Some are still accessible today, but since the area was used as a rubbish tip in the 1950s and 1960s, much of the archaeology has been covered over.

== History ==
The first reliably attributable reference to an iron deposit at Sharkham Point appears to have been made by Henry De la Beche in his memoir of 1839 where he said: "A large iron-lode runs nearly east and west from Sharkham Point, near Brixham, to Upton, and was extensively worked towards the end of 1837".

The mining of iron ore at Sharkham Point was however underway as early as 1790 when a discovery of "considerable quantities of kidney ore" was reported. A century later at the peak period of operation the mine employed 100 workers and shipped ore to South Wales and West Hartlepool for smelting.

It was reported that mining (by the Brixham Hematite Iron Mining Company Ltd) ceased at Sharkham Point in 1914–15. This marked the period when the mining industry across the whole of the south-west region finally reached the point of large scale economic collapse. However, in common with other mines some dump picking may have continued into the 1930s.
