= Brixham Battery =

Coordinates: 50.40202°N 3.52102°W

Brixham Battery and Battery Gardens are an open space on the sea shore in Brixham, Devon at grid reference SX920569. They are a traditional observation point for Brixham trawler races, both past and present.

The 14-acre (57,000 m^{2}) site of Battery Gardens was first used as a battery in 1586 during the war between England and Spain. The Battery was not permanently armed but was certainly active throughout the American War of Independence during the 1780s and the Napoleonic War against France during the first decade of the 19th century. The Battery was also used by the Coast Guard for gunnery training during the 1870s.

All that can be seen today was built from June to September 1940 immediately following the defeat and evacuation of the British Expeditionary Force from Dunkirk after the fall of France.

Of the 116 emergency batteries built in 1940 from John O'Groats to Kent, to Lands End, and to South Wales only seven remain. Of these Brixham Battery is the most complete. English Heritage had surveyed the whole site and it is now a scheduled monument.

== The Battery ==
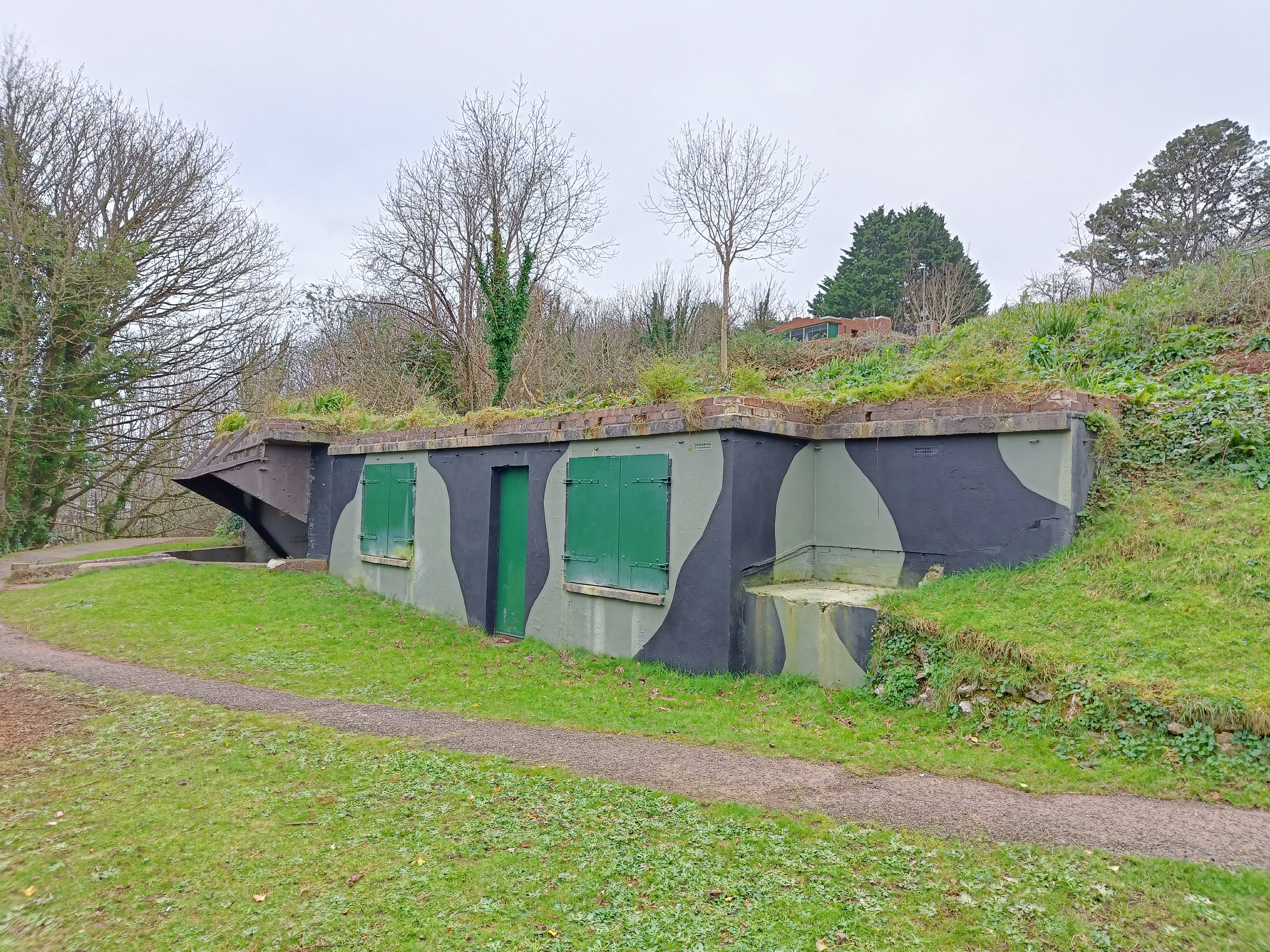
No.2 Gun Floor & War Shelter (B.O.P in background)

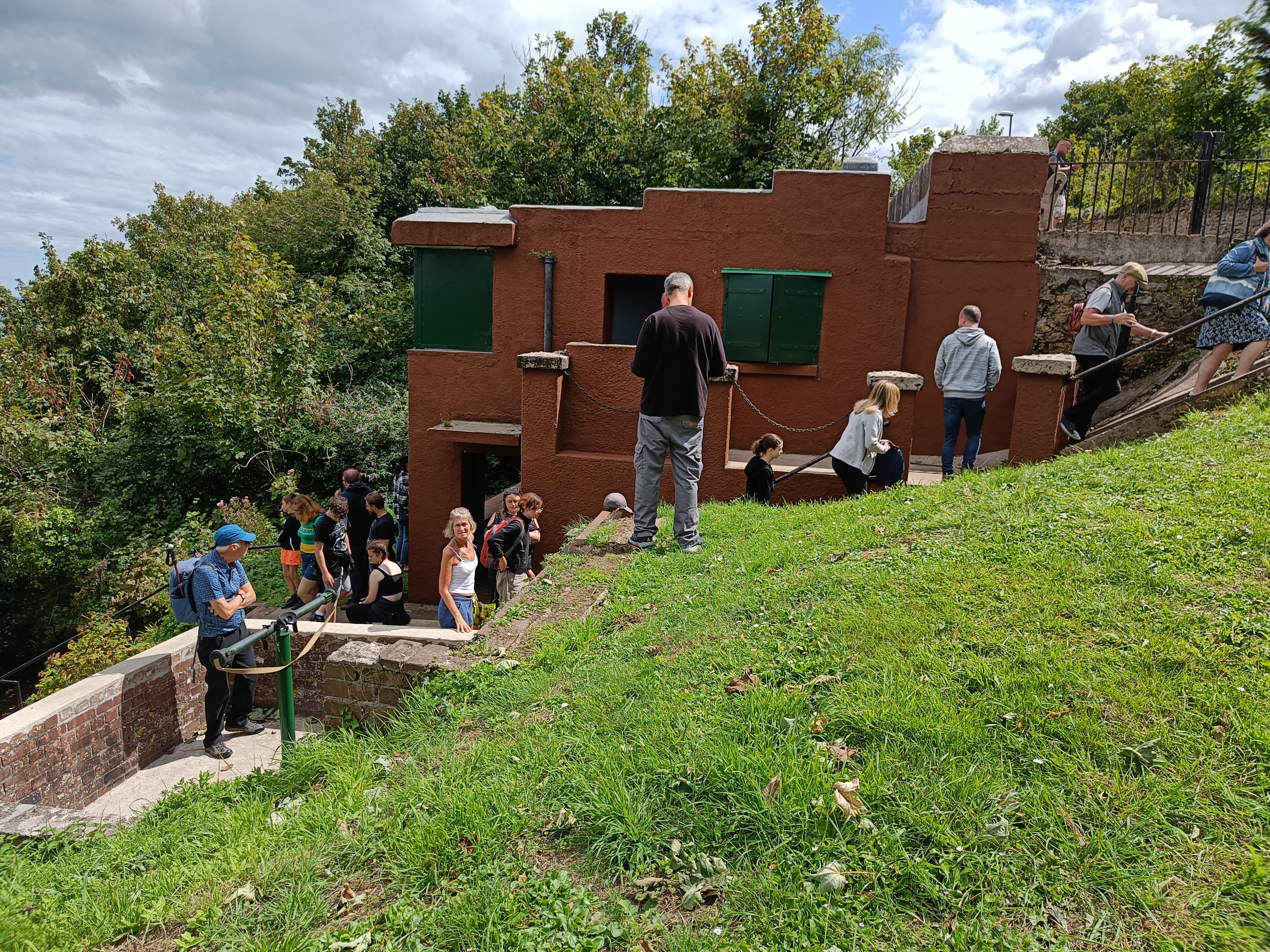
Battery Observation Post (B.O.P)

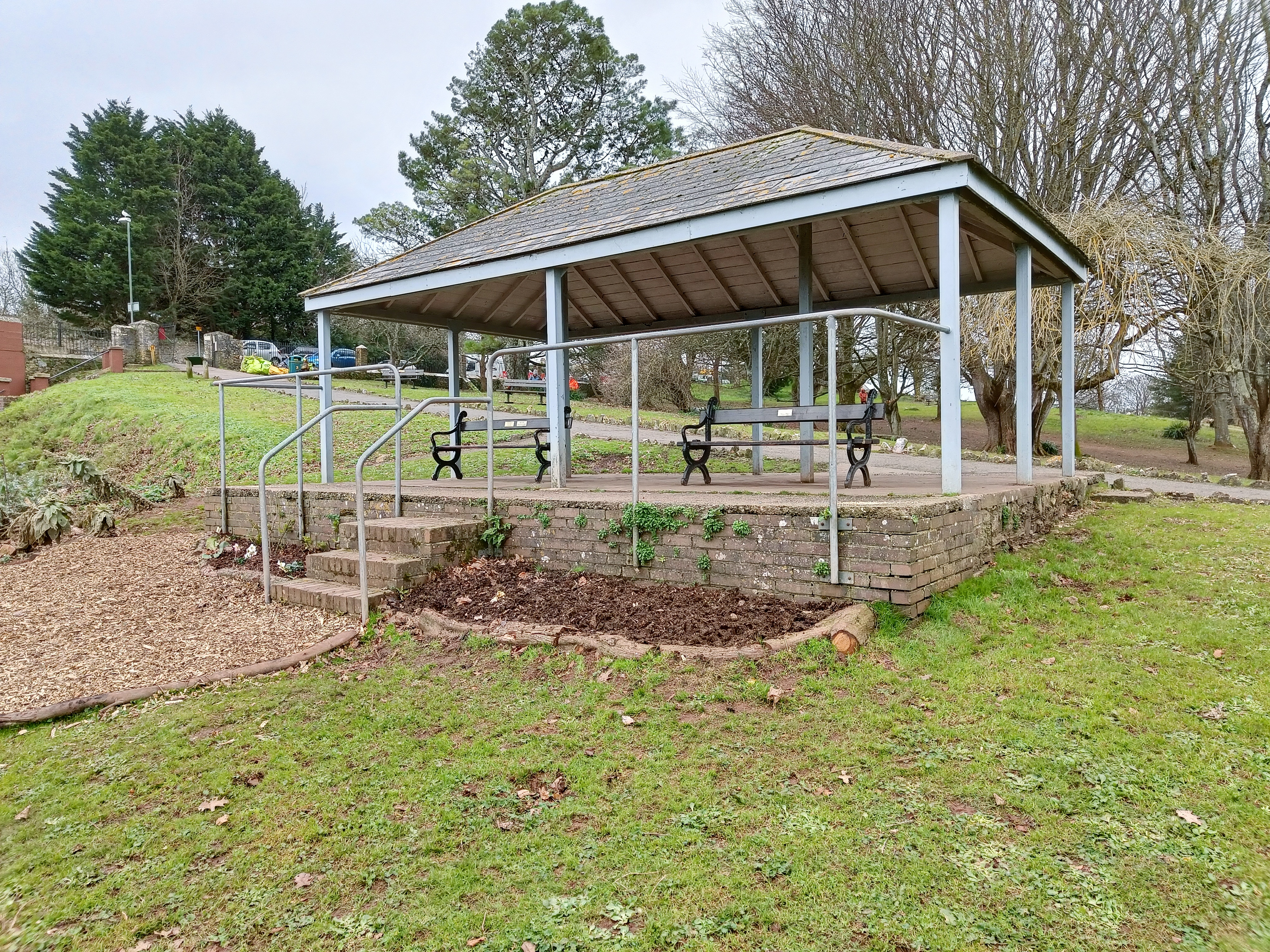
The Altmark

A "battery" is a category of artillery weapons and the soldiers who operate them. The World War II coast and defence batteries had two main guns, anti-aircraft weapons and, in the case of Brixham, extra harbour defence guns.

A total of about one hundred officers and soldiers manned the Battery. The Battery was originally manned by soldiers from the Royal Artillery, but following the receding threat of invasion the Battery was later manned by 378 Battery – of which almost all were members of the Home Guard.

== History ==
=== 1776–1890 ===
It is known that as far back as 1586 a gun platform was established in battery grounds against the threat of attack from Spain. This was maintained until 1664.

From 1776 to 1890 the battery was known variously as Furzdon, Furzeham, Furzham, Furzedown and Fishcombe point. During the end of the 18th century Brixham was the station for the western approach of the Royal Navy, and as such was a very necessary port for the Navy, especially during the American Civil War.

When France joined America in 1778 and Spain in 1779, the Board of Ordnance decided that, along with other naval stations along the south coast of England, Brixham was to be protected by gun emplacements.

Battery gardens was to be the most westerly battery covering the harbour. The militia were to prepare the positions, and the guns, 24 pounders, arrived in May 1780 at the same time as the Berry Head guns (the site of a Napoleonic fort a little along from battery gardens). The land being commandeered, compensation being paid in 1783 at the end of hostilities.

At the start of the French wars the land was purchased and the guns returned. Again the guns were removed at the end of hostilities. The battery was still a military station in a report of 2 June 1862 and was manned by the 11th Devon Artillery Volunteers, Royal Garrison Artillery.

In a naval return of 13 March 1891 there had been a 64 pounder muzzle loading rifled cannon at Furzham on 1 April 1889. This was mounted on gun racers about where number five gun had been eighty years before.

=== 1940–1945 ===
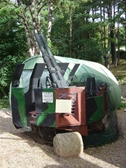
40mm Bofors light anti-aircraft gun

The role of Brixham Battery, in conjunction with a similar battery at Corbyn Head, Torquay, was to defend all the beaches against landings. Beaches such as those at Torre Abbey, Livermead, Hollicombe, Preston, Paignton, Goodrington, Broadsands and Elberry Cove would have made ideal sites for enemy landings. The Corbyn Head battery was well sited to cover targets within the bay while the Brixham Battery could also engage craft further out in Lyme Bay. In addition to the 'big guns' the batteries were equipped with anti-aircraft weaponry and a 6 pounder Hotchkiss harbour defence gun. The anti-aircraft defences at Brixham Battery consisted of a 37 mm AA gun, an Unrotated Projectile projector and 40mm Bofors guns.

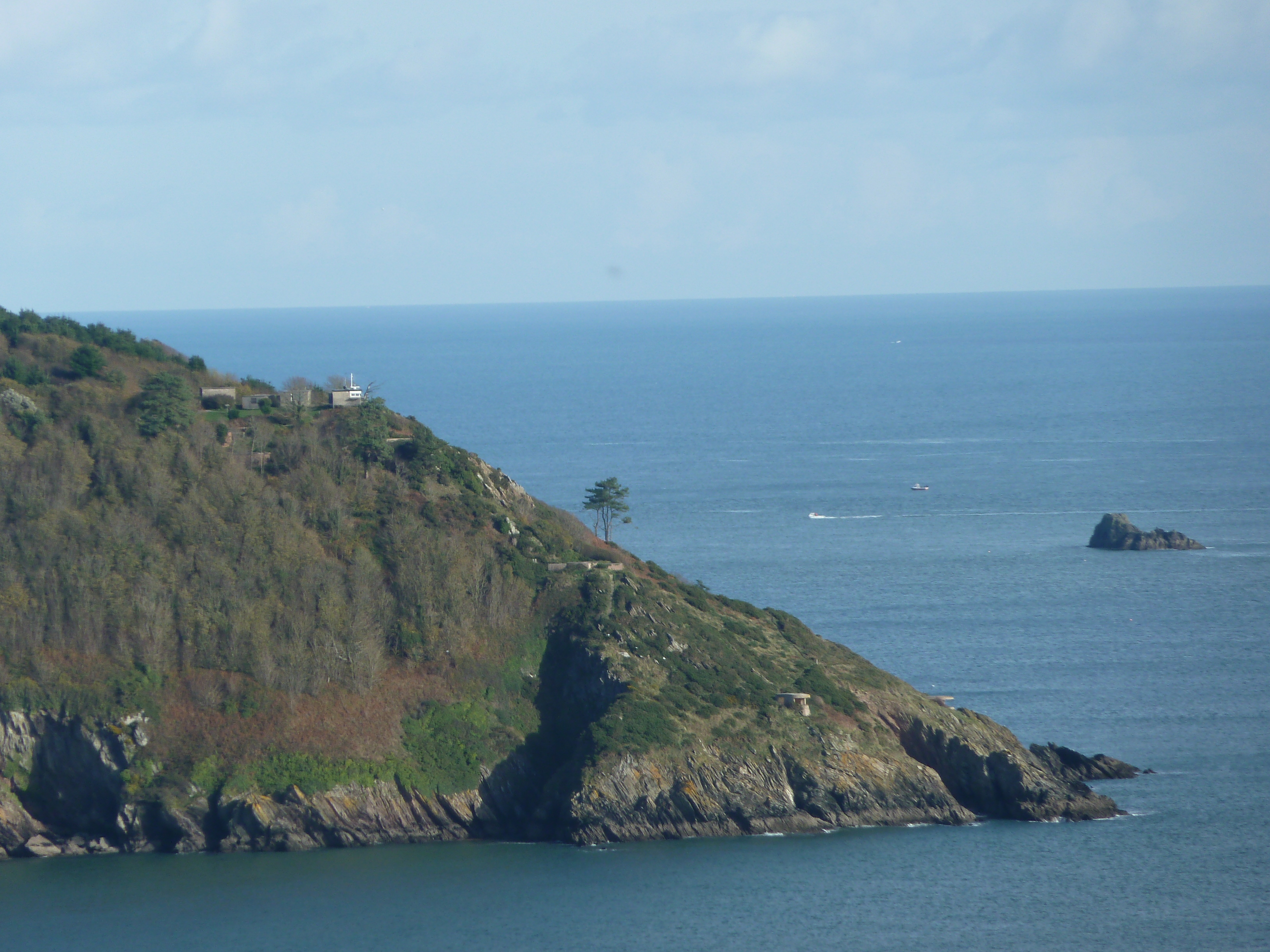
The Brownstone Battery complex from across the River Dart estuary, showing the battery lookout, some buildings, both searchlight posts, one gun emplacement, and sundry other concrete works

The Brixham Battery and a similar one at Corbyn Head, Torquay, were only two of many sited along the South Coast. One of the more heavily armed batteries was at Froward Point, near Kingswear, known as Brownstone Battery. This was a 'close defence' battery sited in June 1942 and armed with 'LS' (Land Service) 6 Inch Mark VII guns on mark II mountings. The role of the battery was to engage enemy forces, such as landing craft and mother ships carrying landing craft, attempting landings on Slapton Sands or Blackpool Sands beaches and to destroy any beach head which had been established. Parts of the gun beds, the battery observation post, magazines, searchlights and other features can still be seen, and are now preserved by the National Trust. The battery observation post is let by the trust to the National Coastwatch Institution, known as NCI Froward Point, and manned by volunteer watchkeepers keeping a lookout for coastal dangers.

In 1940, during the Second World War, the site was manned initially by the Royal Artillery 362 Battery 18 CA GP Regiment, becoming 362 Battery 556 Regiment in 1941 and 378 Battery 556 Regiment in 1942. The Royal Artillery was strongly supported by local men transferred from 'D' Company (10th Torbay) Battalion Devonshire Home Guard. Trained in all the functions of the Battery and being able to man it on their own if the occasion arose, the crews became very efficient and were often commended by the Brigadier Royal Artillery Southern Command and Commander of Coast Artillery South West District.

The 4.7-inch (120 mm) guns were never used in earnest against enemy forces though there were occasions when alerts were ordered. German E-boats entered the bay on several occasions but were never engaged since this might have given away the location of the Battery – information deemed to valuable to an enemy landing force. In principle, engagement of enemy vessels would have been left to the Royal Navy unless orders to the contrary were given by the port commander or higher authorities.

There were, however, many occasions on which the anti-aircraft defences at the battery were in action against the hit-and-run raiders attacking Brixham harbour and shipping in the Bay. These included Messerschmitt Bf 109s carrying a single 500 lb (230 kg) bomb, and later the Focke-Wulf Fw 190s which carried a formidable 1,000 lb (450 kg) bomb.

== Brixham Battery Heritage Group & Museum ==
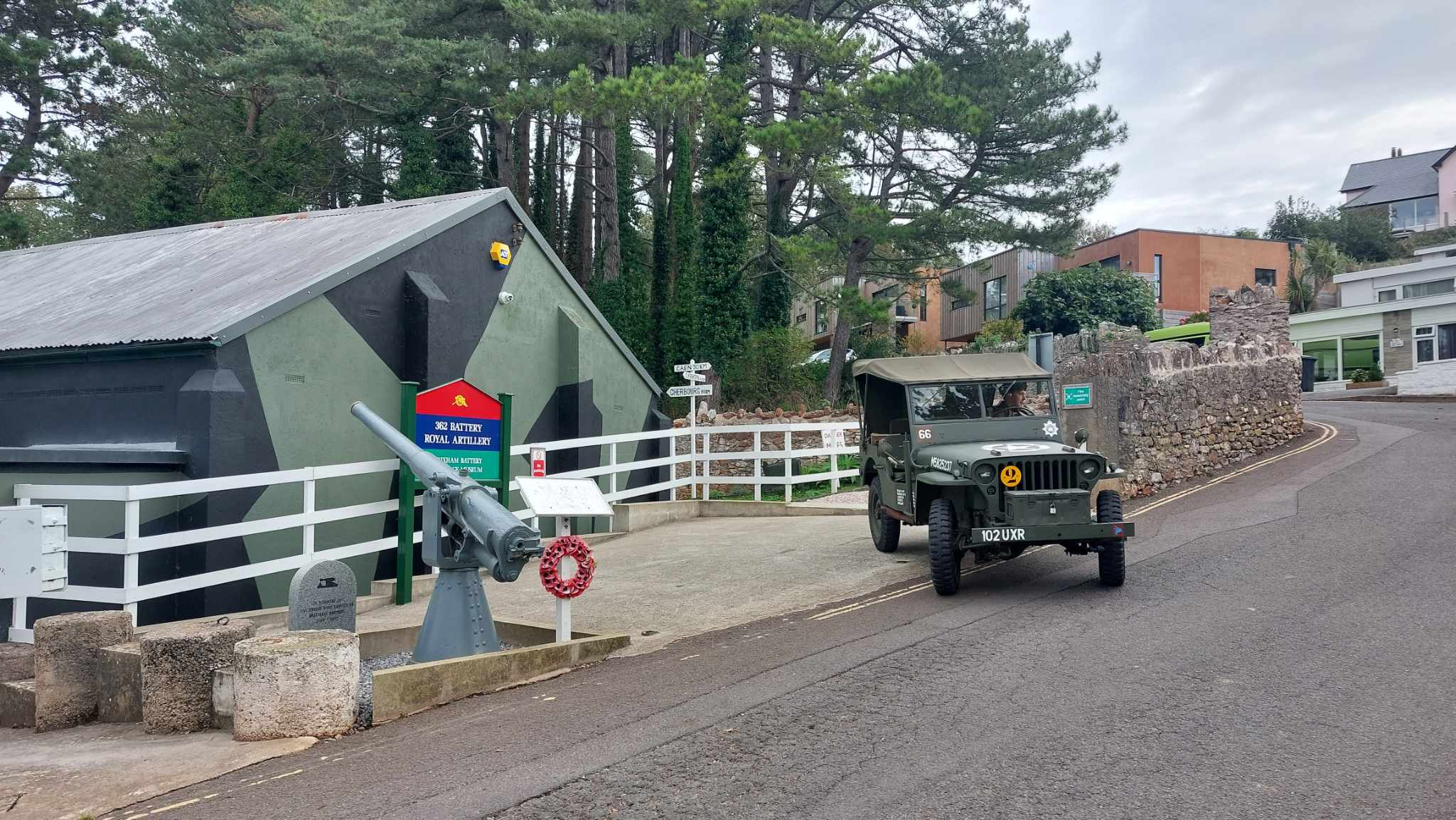
Brixham Battery Museum

Created in 1999, the Heritage Centre Group is committed to the promotion of the history of the Brixham Battery as well as the environment, flora and fauna. The volunteers have overseen the expansion of its on-site education centre within the grounds of the gardens, known as Brixham Battery Heritage Museum.
