= St. Mary's Bay, Devon =

Bay and beach in Devon, England

Coordinates: 50.388°N 3.500°W

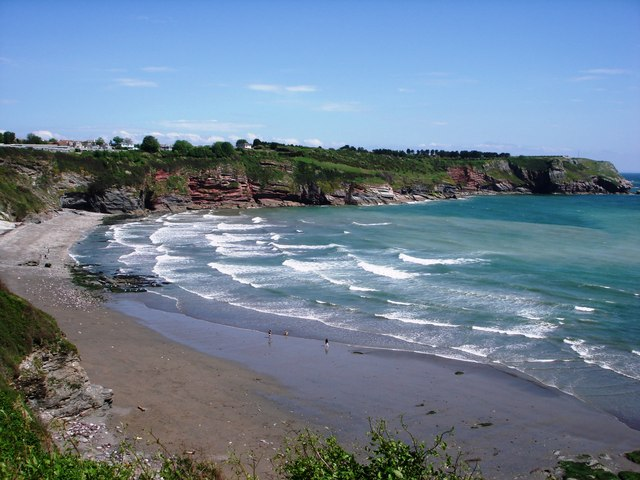
St Mary's Bay

St. Mary's Bay is a sand and shingle beach located near the fishing town of Brixham, Devon, England. It was originally called Mudstone Bay because of the local mudstone bedrock of the cliffs. It has footpath access from a car park and can be reached as a detour from a walk along the coast path. There is a viewpoint on Sharkham Point above the beach. Fossils can be found here.
