= Sharkham Point =

Headland on the south coast of Devon, England

Coordinates: 50.3817°N 3.4979°W

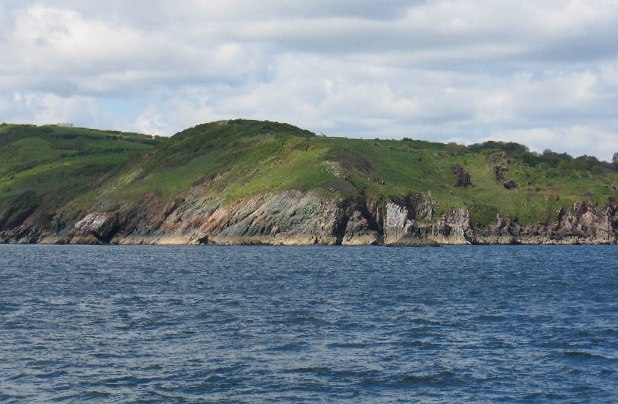
Sharkham Point.

Sharkham Point is a headland located close to the Devon fishing town of Brixham. It overlooks St. Mary's Bay and is a short walk away from Berry Head Country Park. This stretch was originally the Coastguard Walk along which the coastguards regularly patrolled. At St. Mary's Bay the path begins to rise and fall over the soft, middle Devonian shales which have eroded to form what was once called "Mudstone Bay". On the beach below you can find many fossils.

Sharkham Point was once the site of extensive iron workings and old adits can still be found, dating from the period 1790 to 1930. However many remains were covered when Sharkham Point was used as the Brixham town tip. The site is now managed as a nature conservation area, and there are fine views from it of the Heritage coastline.
