= Brixham Harbour =

Harbour and fishing port in Devon, England

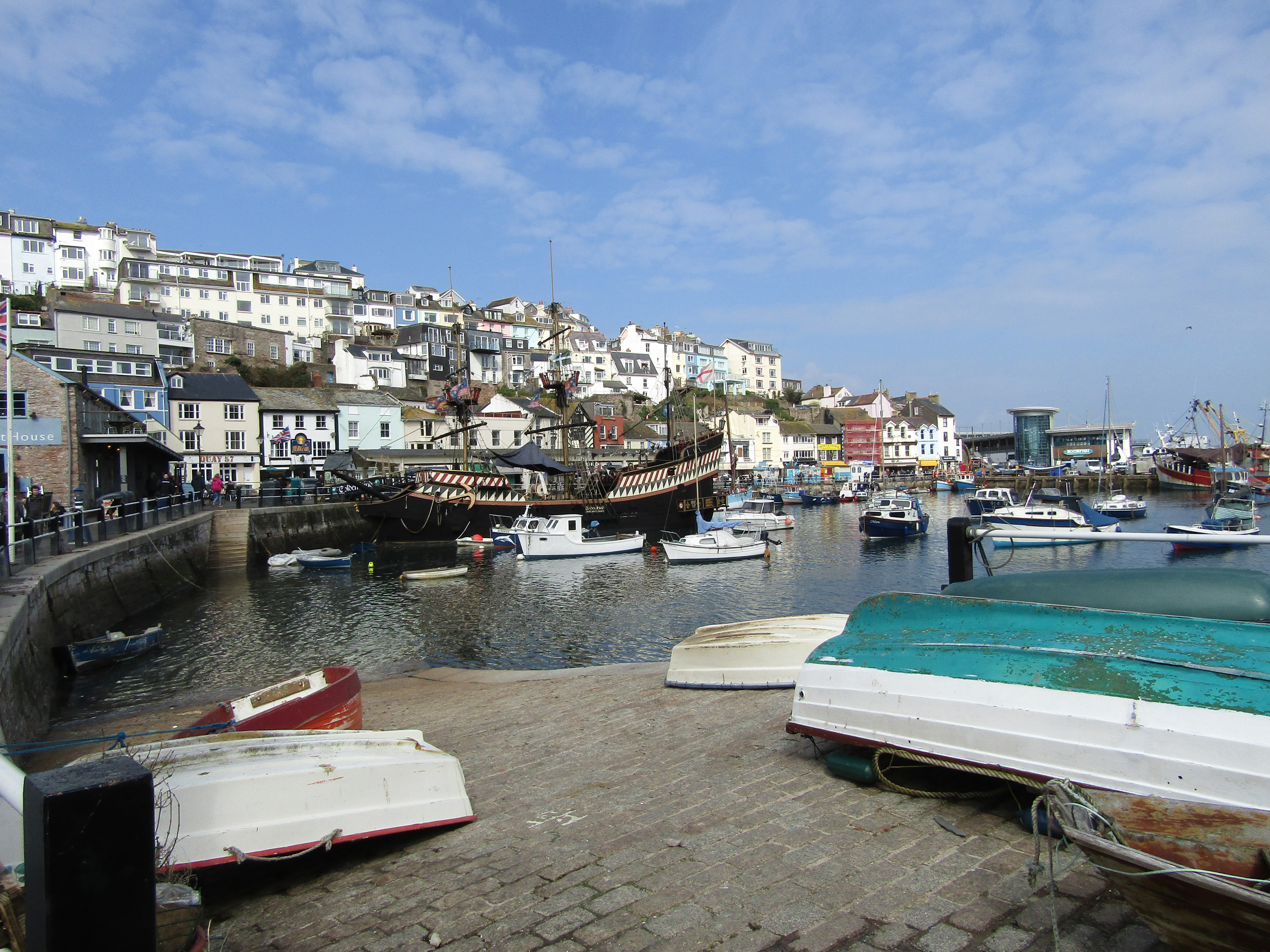
- The inner harbour from the slipway
- Interactive map of Brixham Harbour
- Location within Devon

Location
- Country: England
- Location: Lower Brixham
- Coordinates: 50.396615°N 3.512106°W

Brixham Harbour is a harbour and fishing port situated at Brixham, Devon, England. It is home to one of the largest fishing fleets in the United Kingdom.

== Description ==
The port consists of an inner and an outer harbour.

=== Inner Harbour ===
The inner harbour provides trot moorings for approximately 50 vessels, up to 35 feet in length.

Within the inner harbour there is a replica of Francis Drake's Golden Hind. The vessel is permanently moored and is used as a museum ship.

The old fish market is situated on the western side of the harbour. Nearby is the Old Market House, a Grade II listed building which is now used as a restaurant.

=== Outer Harbour ===
The outer harbour provides deepwater swing moorings for approximately 250 vessels, up to 100 feet in length, but generally up to 70 feet in length.
