= British Seaman's Boys' Home =

Coordinates: 50.3983°N 3.5074°W

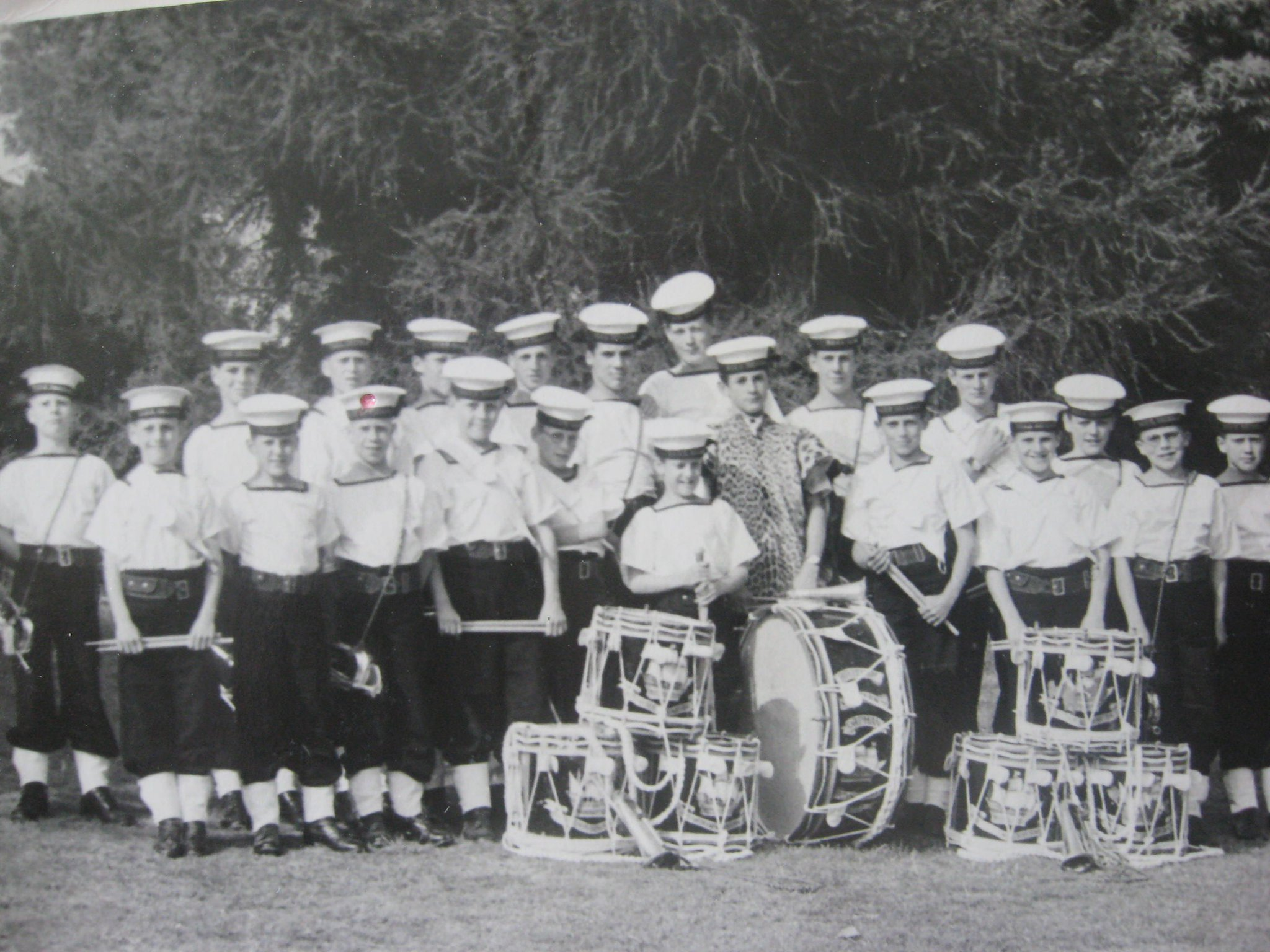
BSBH Band circa 1962

The British Seaman's Orphan Boys' Home (Note: "Orphan" has long since been omitted from the name) was founded in Brixham on the Berry Head Road in 1863 by William Gibbs of Tyntesfield for the orphan sons of deceased British seamen. He died in 1875 and his widow conveyed the Home upon trust to the Bishop of Exeter, with the object of providing for the orphan sons of British seamen. It was closed in 1988 after 125 years.

It was famous for its bugle and drum marching band which could be seen marching from the home to All Saints' Church most Sundays.

Many hundreds of boys have passed through the Home and have been given a good start in life which they otherwise would have not had – most went on to join the Royal Navy. Some boys, in later life, spoke about the brutality of aspects of the orphanage, including physical violence and lack of affection or warmth . Life was very regimented for already traumatised children in the early part of the twentieth century.

== Post Closure ==
In 1990 it became a Nautical Venture Centre then in 1995 became the Grenville House Outdoor Education Centre
