= Church of St Thomas of Canterbury, Kingswear =

Church in Devon, England

Coordinates: 50.3484°N 3.5725°W

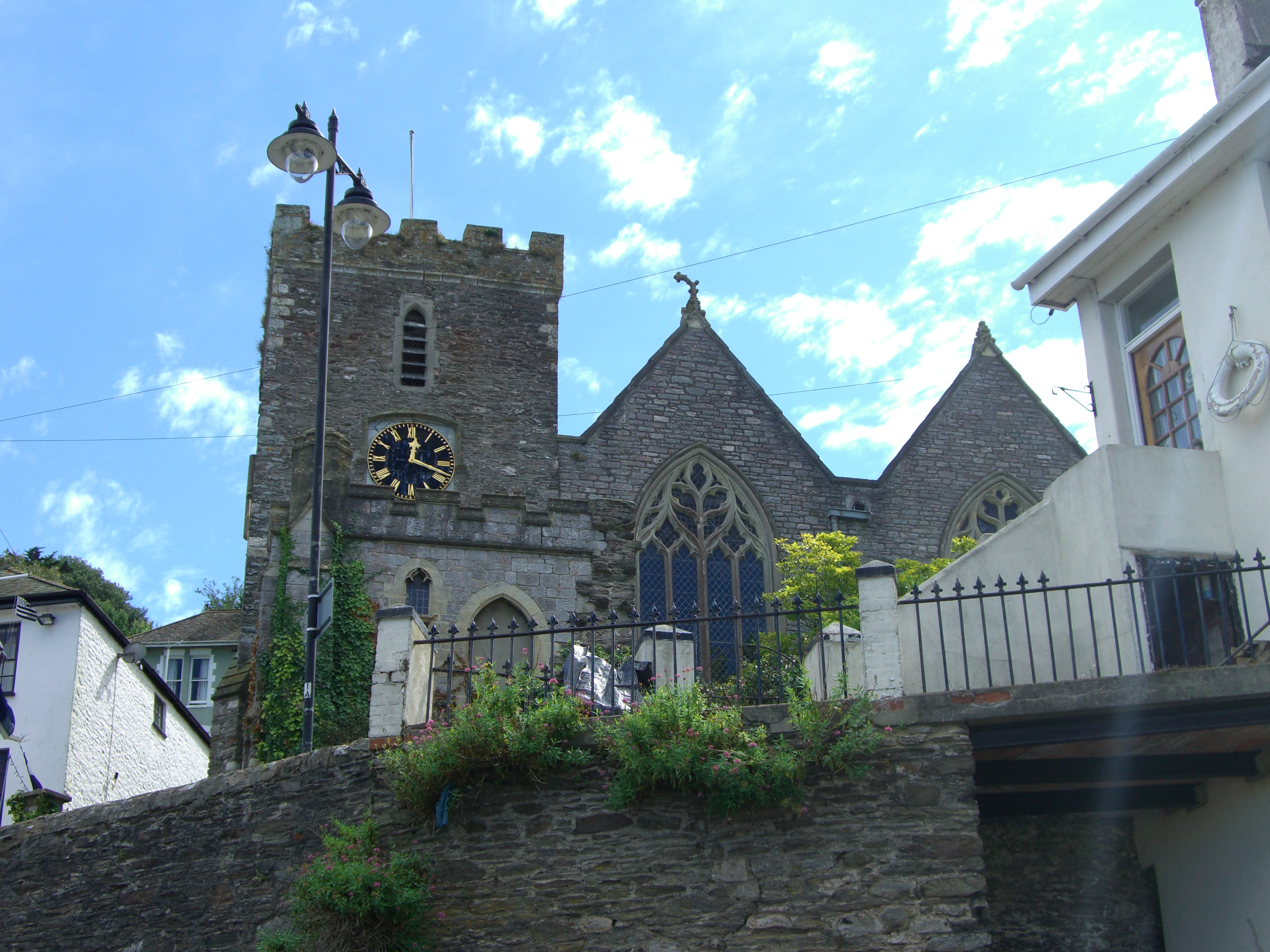

The Church of St Thomas of Canterbury is situated in the village of Kingswear in the English county of Devon, it stands in a slightly elevated position at the junction of Higher Street and Church Hill close to the railway station and the Dartmouth Lower Ferry and overlooks the River Dart. The church is a grade II listed building.

== History ==
A church has stood on the present site since about 1170 on land owned by the de Vasci family since the Norman Conquest. Hugh Watkins in his article The foundation and early history of Dartmouth and Kingswear Church stated that the earliest deeds relating to the church were drawn up about 1173 and are in Totnes Priory: Willelmus de Vasci and his wife Juliana for the souls of their fathers and mothers and for the soul of Willelmus Buzun, give half the land of Kingeswere to Ricardus the deacon and to others succeeding him or serving the true God, Jesus Christ, and Saint Thomas there. By the license of lord Rogerus de Nunant whose fief the aforesaid land is and by the sanction of Wido de Nunant Renricus and Baldewinus. Ratified by the seal of lord Rogerus de Nunant and witnessed by Ricardus the chaplain, Johel de Waytord, Jordan de Hode, Robertus the serving man of Wido and the brothers of Martin.

An abstract of another accompanying deed states: I, Willelmus de Vasci, for the safety of my soul and of my ancestors and of the soul of Willelmus Buzun my lord, have conceded and confirmed to God and to the Church of the Blessed Mary of Totonia and to the monks serving God there, half of the whole of my land which I have in Kingeswere, just as it can be reasonably divided by just men of our mutual friends, that is to say for the increase of the maintenance of the chaplain who for the time being serves the chapel founded in honour of the Blessed Thomas the Martyr at the said Kingeswere. Confirmed by the impression of my seal and witnessed by Michael de Spichewiche, Garinus de Morcell, Willelmus de Linguire, Osmundus de Colatun, Willelmus Daggevile, Willelmus de Winestone, Robertus le Bastard, Godefridus de Austine and many others.

The church was dedicated to St Thomas of Canterbury and this is thought to have originated because of the wave of piety which followed Thomas’ death in Canterbury Cathedral in 1170. Thomas Becket was canonized in 1173 so the naming of the church must date from after 1173. In its early days the church came under the sphere of influence of Totnes Priory and the church's priests were monks from the priory. In 1196 Willelmus Willelnusrywera formed Torre Abbey and Walterus de Vasci, son of Willelmus, gave the remaining part of the lands at Kingswear to the Abbey and Totnes Priory's holding was also transferred. A deed in the Cartulary dated 1253 shows that Torre Abbey then owned eight manors and churches: Aveton-cum-Townstal, Ffloade (in or near Ashton), Hopyrigge, Ducconbe, Wadeton, Achelglit, Kingswear and Blakawton.

Records of the church's early history are few.

On 6 April 1267 Bishop Walterus de Bronescombe held a convocation in the chapel of Saint Thomas the Martyr at Kynggeswere, at which the first person recorded as being present is the Abbot of Torre, but not the Prior of Totnes. The object of the convocation, according to the Register, had no local significance, but was to receive a petition of five parishioners from Okehampton that an interdict might be removed from their parish church.

In 1280 Brother Philip, believed to be Philip Fitzurse, a descendant of Reginald Fitzurse one of the knights who murdered St Thomas, is a witness to a deed with several local landowners which include Willelmus de Fissacre. In the church there survives an ancient stone coffin lid, presumed to be part of his tomb. It is fortunate that Jeremiah Milles in his Parochial Collections of 1755 visited the church, made a drawing and recorded the inscription and lettering of the words on the stone, while it was still possible to read the inscription round the edge of the stone, now scarcely visible. You who pray here for the soul of Philip shall have thirty days pardon as a reward.

During the rebuilding of the Church 1845 to 1847 the stone was turned out into the churchyard where it lay among the weeds and the rubbish at the east end of the building and become more weathered and injured every year. By 1939 concern was expressed at its position and condition, but it was not until the Rev F H Keyworth (vicar 1935–55) that the ancient tombstone was brought back into the church where it lies on the left of the Lady Chapel.

When Henry VIII fell out with Rome, the 1534 Act of Supremacy was passed which gave him the authority to disband the monasteries and confiscate their property. This included the land in Kingswear owned by the Torre Monastery. The following is a résumé of a parchment belonging to the Feoffees of Crediton, dated 22 February 1544:

Grant by Henry VIIIth under the Great Seal of England to Thomas Gale, for service and the sum of £93 and 20 pence paid to “the Treasury of our Court of the Augmentation of Revenues.” all that our manor of Kyngeswere in the county of Devon formerly held by the monastery of Torre now dissolved as fully as the last Abbot of Torre held to the full value of £5 3s. 5½d. with the tithe not deducted to hold for the service of X/60th part of a Knight’s fee while paying annually 10s. 4½d. to the Court of Augmentation of Revenues on the festival of St. Michael in the name of ferry tithe (decime pontis) for all services further we grant for the above consideration to the said Thomas Gale all rights of Court, assize of bread wine and beer tolls from fairs liberty of warren which the aforesaid Abbot had, and we acquit and exonerate etc, etc: and we wish that this be granted under the Great Seal of England. Witnessed on the 22nd February 35 Henry VIII. Vivian Thomas Gale lived in Dartmouth and died in 1557. His nephew, George, inherited his uncle's property, but lived in Crediton which may explain why the parchment was found in that town.

Torre Abbey was dissolved in 1539 and Kingswear Church placed under the care of the Parish of Brixham.

From the time of Brother Philip, very little is known of the history of the Church although there are record books and registers going back to 1601. It certainly continued to be a chapel of ease for the parish of Brixham under whose care it came at the Reformation and the Vicar of that Parish was responsible for providing the priest to serve Kingswear. The plague virtually decimated the village in 1604 when 145 people died from the disease, as marked in the parish register with the letter P. An account in Jeremiah Milles’ Parochial Collections states: The church seems to be an ancient building, but is in a very indifferent and ruinous condition. It contains a nave and a south aisle and a gallery at the west end. Also a Pope’s Bowl, with the beads fastened to it dated 1309 and now in the parish chest. Services were held only once a month.

It is believed by some that throughout the following centuries the church was much utilised by continental pilgrims who used Kingswear as a landing place on the pilgrimage to Canterbury to see the tomb of St Thomas. However, there appears little evidence to support this.

In 1847, with the village of Kingswear expanding, funds were granted to rebuild the church with the work being overseen by Exeter architect J. Hayward. The church was demolished except for the original 12th-century tower with the rest of the church reconstructed in local limestone with freestone dressing. Hayward used the same Decorated style and the same design as the old church, but on a slightly reduced scale.

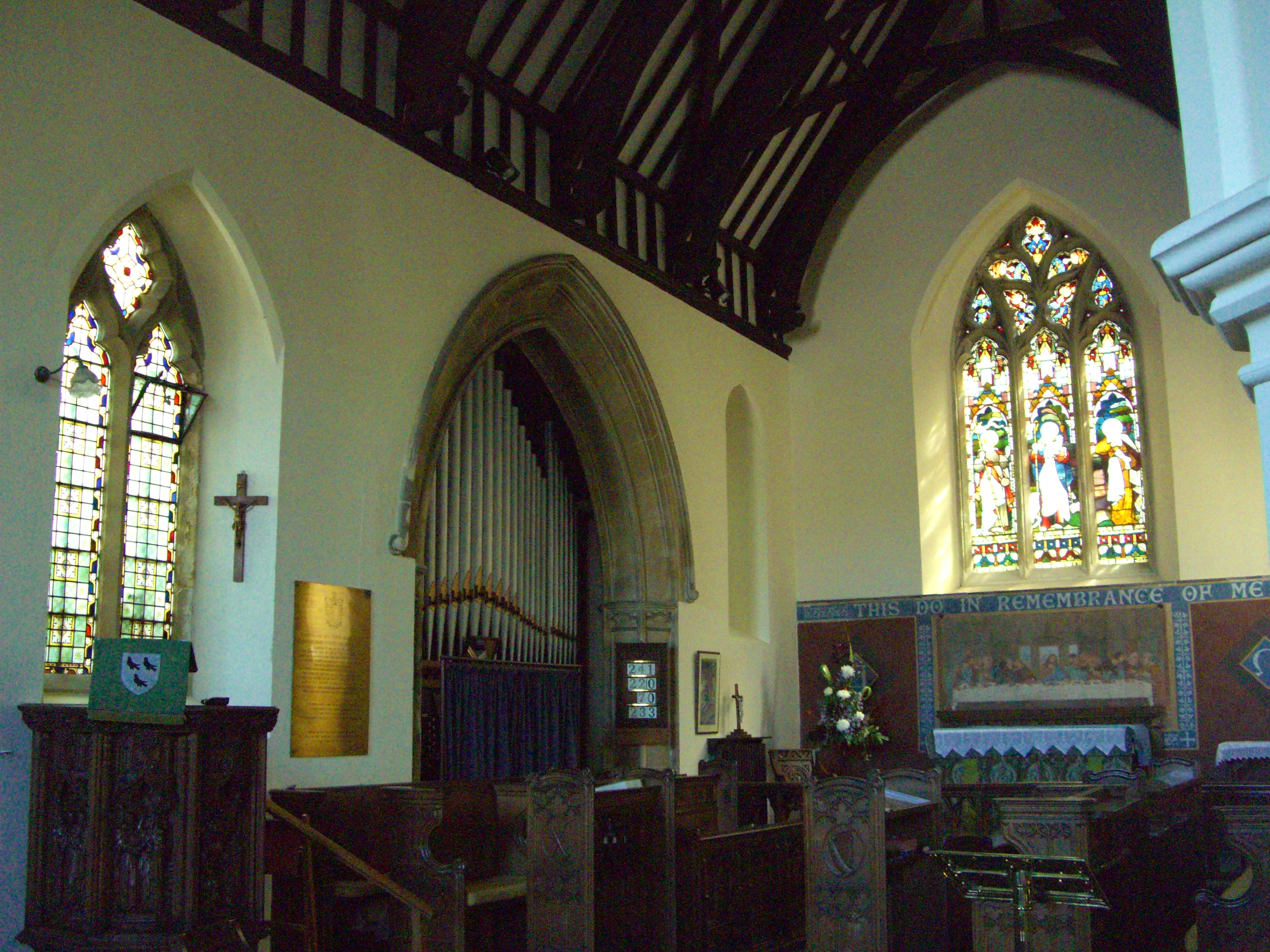
The interior

== Church features ==
The church has a ring of three bells within the tower, there was formerly four but one was sold off in 1767 to pay for a clock for the church. The treble and second were cast c1599 by Thomas Birdall of Exeter and the tenor was re-cast in 1939 by John Taylor & Co of Loughborough. When the tenor was re-cast in 1939 the treble and second were fitted with canon retaining headstocks and the three bells were fitted into a six bell frame, with the intention of adding three further bells at a later date. This is yet to happen though. The present day clock dates from 1897, it cost £124 and was purchased by subscription from Kingswear village to mark the sixtieth anniversary of Queen Victoria’s accession to the throne. It is thought by some that the octagonal font is Norman although Cresswell states that it is 15th-century, the cover is mid-20th-century and is the work of a local craftsman. The carved wooden pulpit dates from 1921 and was a gift from the late Bishop William Boyd Carpenter while the oak choir stalls and seating come from the same year and were donated by Sir Thomas Leonard.

The most noteworthy stained glass window is located near the organ, it depicts St Michael and is a memorial to Commander Valentine Gibbs who took part in the Zeebrugge Raid during World War I and is buried in the church cemetery. The church also contains a memorial and citation to Lieutenant-Colonel H. Jones VC who was killed in the Falklands War. The nave has some 18th-century tomb slabs on the floor while the porch contains a framed drawing of the church from 1841 and shows the building before the 1847 rebuild.

== Organ ==
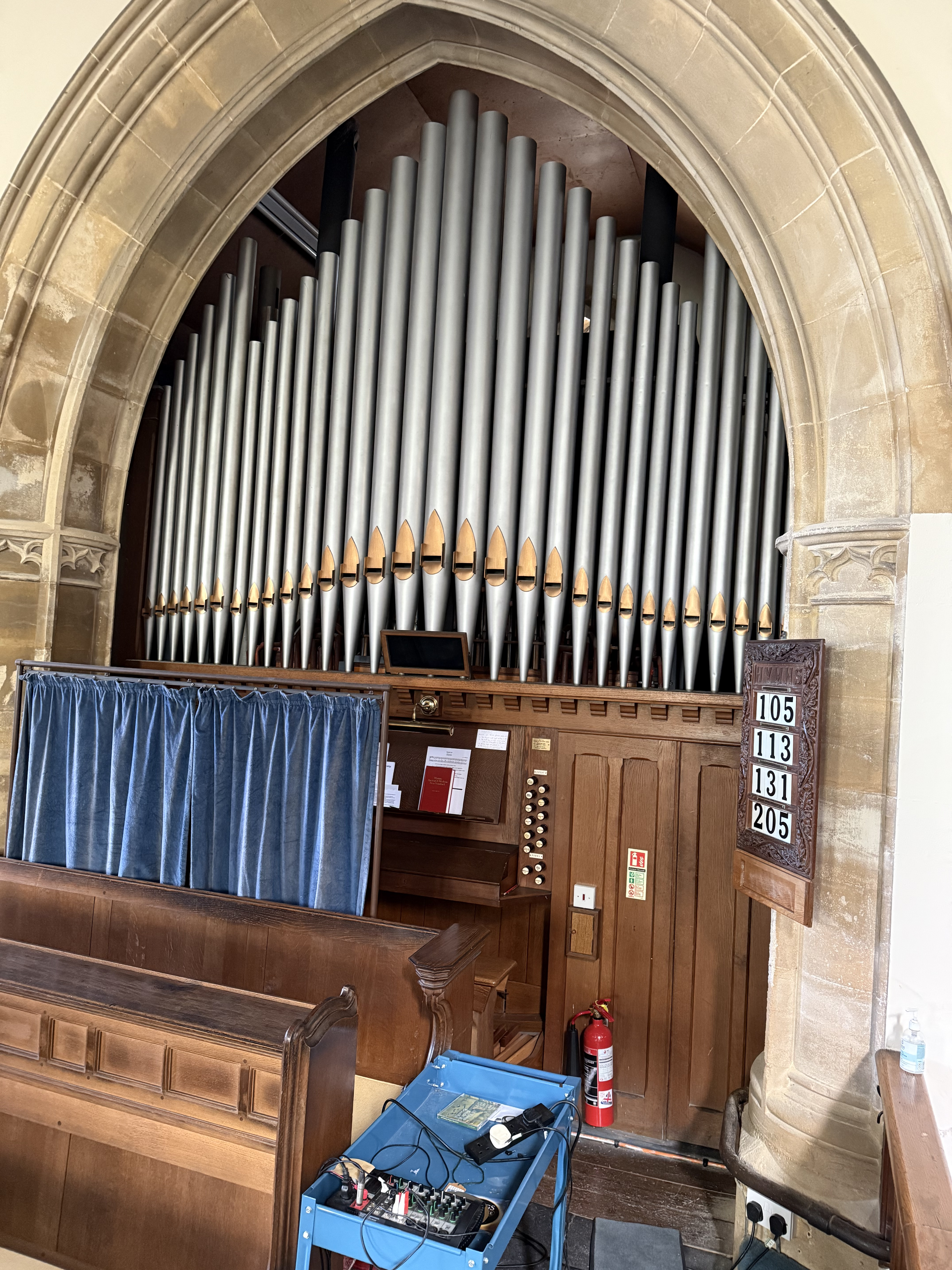
The organ

The organ dates from 1916. It cost £350 (equivalent to £26,300 in 2025), of which half was given by the Carnegie Trust. It was restored in 1959 at a cost of £500 by George Osmond and Company. It now stands in a chamber on the north side of the chancel.

It was restored and enlarged by Michael Farley, Budleigh Salterton in 1995. A specification of the organ can be found on the National Pipe Organ Register.

== The Tower ==
Although the church was rebuilt in 1847 the old tower was retained and dates from about 1173. In those days it was not normal for there to be settlements on the water's edge for fear of raids by Vikings, French and the Irish. Kingswear is not listed in the Domesday Book but that of Coleton to the east is. Similarly Dartmouth, on the opposite side of the river Dart to Kingswear is not listed either but Townstal to the west is. Both on the tops of hills relatively safe from unexpected raids.

According to Charles Cox church towers dating from the Norman period sometimes had an additional defensive purpose. This is especially true in the counties which suffered from border raids, such as Northumberland, but similar towers are found elsewhere. In these towers access was by a winding staircase around a central newel and protected by a portcullis. The towers had upper chambers with a fireplace with a flue to the roof to provide living accommodation. Much of this could easily apply to Kingswear's church tower although there is no evidence of a portcullis.

The de Vasci family had extensive holdings in Northumberland dating from 1093 including the barony of Alnwick and so would have known about the dual use of church towers in that county. There is a history of raids from the sea in south Devon and these probably continued after the Conquest so there could have been a similar defence role to be met at the entrance to the river Dart. The Kingswear tower has a circular stone staircase to the first floor, taking two full turns to get to the higher level. Earlier accounts report a fireplace on the first floor with a flue to the roof. The flue still exists and stretches from the ground floor to the top of the tower.
