= Brixham Town Hall =

Municipal building in Brixham, Devon, England

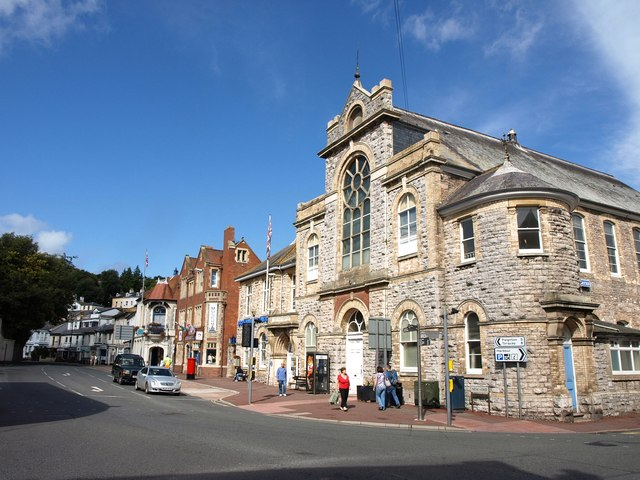
- Brixham Town Hall

- Shown in Devon
- 50.3944°N 3.5161°W
- Location: New Road, Brixham

History
- Built: 1886

Site notes
- Architect: George Bridgman
- Architectural style: Italianate style

Listed Building – Grade II
- Official name: Town Hall
- Designated: 18 October 1993
- Reference no.: 1298263

Brixham Town Hall is a municipal building in New Street, Brixham, Devon, England. The structure, which is the meeting place of Brixham Town Council, is a Grade II listed building.

== History ==
The first municipal building in the town was the harbourside market house, a small oblong building in The Strand used as a fish market, which dated from the late 18th century. Civic leaders considered erecting a more substantial facility in the 1830s but little progress was made and in the magistrates continued to rent rooms for their petty session hearings.

In the 1880s, civic leaders decided to procure a combined town hall and market hall: the site chosen was a former naval reservoir used for collecting water before it was piped down to the ships in the harbour. The new building was designed by George Bridgman in the Italianate style, built in rough limestone at a cost of £3,000 and was officially opened on 1 October 1886. The design involved an asymmetrical main frontage with seven bays facing onto New Street; the central section of three bays, which slightly projected forward, featured a central doorway with an archivolt, inscribed with the words "Brixham Market", flanked by two round headed windows. On the first floor there was a tall round headed window with tracery and an archivolt flanked by two more round headed windows. The gable above, which contained a blind oculus, was flanked by battlemented pedestals and was surmounted by a finial. There was a three bay section to the left and a bay to the right which curved round into Market Street. Internally, the principal rooms on the ground floor were the courtroom in the left hand section, together with the market hall and, behind it, the fish market in the central section; the principal rooms on the first floor were the offices of the harbour commissioners in the left hand section and the upper hall in the central section.

After significant population growth, largely associated with the fishing industry, the area became an urban district with the town hall as its headquarters in 1895. The fish market was converted into an events venue known as the Scala Hall in the early 20th century. Meanwhile, the upper hall was used as a drill hall until the end of the First World War: it subsequently came under the management of the newly-formed Brixham Operatic and Amateur Dramatic Society and became known as the Brixham Theatre. The poet, Malcolm Lowry, visited the theatre to see a performance there in summer 1933.

The building continued to serve as the headquarters of Brixham Urban District Council for much of the 20th century but ceased to be the local seat of government when the area was absorbed into the short-lived county borough of Torbay in 1968. After a major programme of refurbishment works, the theatre re-opened under the management of the actor, John Slater, in 1973 and remained under his direction until his sudden death two years later. The market hall was subsequently converted into a community centre and charity shop for a befriending charity, known as Brixham Does Care, which was founded in 1978.

The town hall became the home of Brixham Town Council shortly after it was established in 2007 and the theatre was brought under the management of a local community group known as the Brixham Arts & Theatre Society in 2008. In March 2021, the unitary authority for the area, Torbay Council, announced its intention to withdraw financial support from the pannier market, which had previously operated from the Scala Hall on three days each week, leading to its permanent closure.
