= Brixham College =

Location
- Higher Ranscombe Road; Brixham, Devon, TQ5 9HF; England
- Coordinates: 50.39304°N 3.50899°W

Information
- Type: Academy
- Religious affiliation: Mixed
- Department for Education URN: 137755 Tables
- Ofsted: Reports
- Principal: R Blackshaw
- Gender: Mixed
- Age: 11 to 18
- Enrolment: 1,054. as of January 2025
- Capacity: 750
- Website: http://brixhamcollege.co.uk/

Brixham College is a mixed secondary school and sixth form located in Brixham in the English county of Devon.

Previously a foundation school administered by Torbay Council, Brixham College was converted to academy status on 1 January 2012. However the school continues to coordinate with Torbay Council for admissions.

Brixham College offers GCSEs, BTECs and NVQs as programmes of study for pupils, while students in the sixth form have the option to study from a range of A-levels and OCR Nationals.

The school was originally built for 750 students but has around 1200 students.
