= Kingswear Regatta =

Annual English regatta

Coordinates: 50.3514°N 3.5699°W

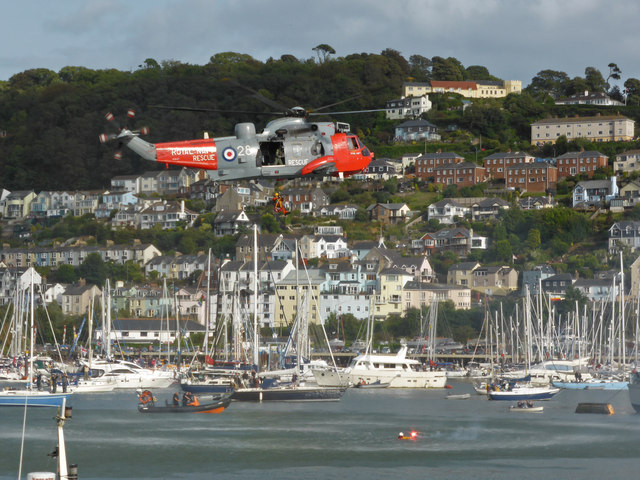
The air sea rescue display at the 2014 regatta

The Kingswear Regatta was held in August 2006 in Kingswear, Devon, England, for the first time in 100 years, and has been celebrated each year since apart from 2020.

Taking place over two days the regatta is focussed around rowing races on Water Head creek (an inlet off the River Dart). The first day consisting mostly of racing heats, the second day being much more of a family and village féte as well as the day on which racing finals are held. The regatta ends with a prize ceremony at Kingswear Village Hall. Trophies and honours being displayed in the nearby Ship Inn public house during the year. In 2014 the regatta included an air sea rescue display.

== History ==
The Dartmouth Chronicle and Advertiser reported on the 4th annual Waterhead Creek Regatta in October 1893. The headline ran “When Kingswear was a Market Town, Dartmouth was a Furzey Town” The article went on to say “We in Dartmouth will not dispute the honour or antiquity of our neighbour (Kingswear) as we are both old enough to know the truth of the matter. Kingswear determined to do honour to the noble stream whose beautiful banks she jointly occupies – so she must also have her Regatta, which came off on September 21st, amidst due honours”

There were many events that day from the four-oared ‘spade’ race, to serious races in two- and four-oared boats, as well as gigs representing both Dartmouth and Kingswear, with prizes up to £3 – quite a sum in 1893! After the rowing the article says that “there was some good racing on ‘Jerusalem Ponies’, alias donkeys and some excellent wrestling contests on the butts. An open-air dance commenced at 7 pm in The Square to the strains of the Dartmouth Artillery Band and this was the splendid conclusion to the 4th Annual Kingswear Regatta”.

In 1894 a series of races were again held followed by a water polo match, and in 1895 by swimming races.
