= Kingswear =

Village in Devon, England

Coordinates: 50.348°N 3.573°W

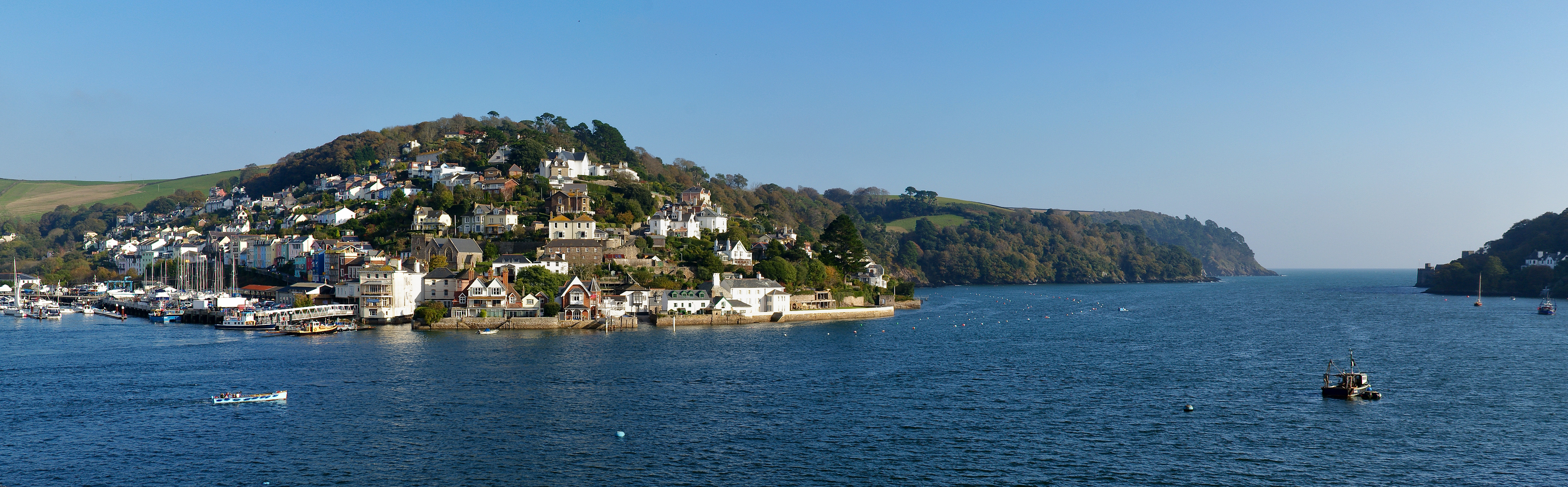
- Kingswear as seen from Dartmouth

- Location within Devon
- Population: 1,217 (2011)
- OS grid reference: SX881510
- Civil parish: Kingswear
- District: South Hams
- Shire county: Devon
- Region: South West
- Country: England
- Sovereign state: United Kingdom
- Post town: DARTMOUTH
- Postcode district: TQ6
- Dialling code: 01803
- Police: Devon and Cornwall
- Fire: Devon and Somerset
- Ambulance: South Western
- UK Parliament: Totnes

Kingswear is a village and civil parish in the South Hams area of the English county of Devon. The village is located on the east bank of the tidal River Dart, close to the river's mouth and opposite the small town of Dartmouth. It lies within the South Devon Area of Outstanding Natural Beauty, and has a population of 1,332, reducing to 1,217 at the 2011 census.

Kingswear is noted for being the railway terminus for Dartmouth, a role continued to this day by the presence of the Paignton and Dartmouth Steam Railway in the village. Two vehicle ferries and one pedestrian ferry provide links to Dartmouth.

The village itself contains several small tourist-oriented shops and public houses, and is home to the Royal Dart Yacht Club. Kingswear Castle, a privately owned 15th century artillery tower, is situated on the outskirts. Kingswear also contains the Church of St Thomas, which is a member of the Anglican Diocese of Exeter and whose patron saint is Saint Thomas of Canterbury.

== History ==
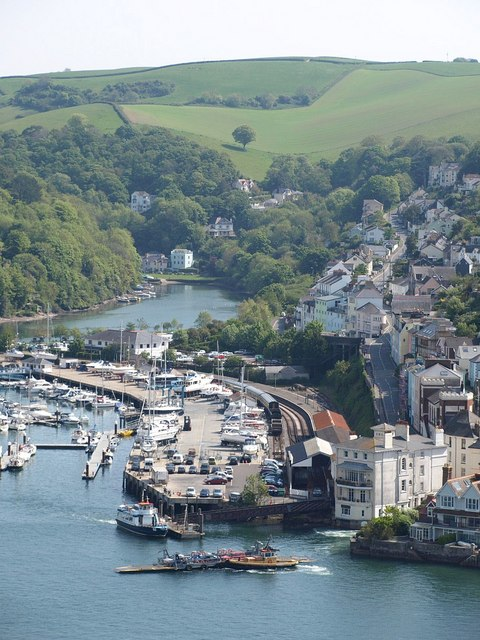
Kingswear, seen from above Dartmouth. The railway station, passenger ferry and lower vehicle ferry can all be seen, as can Lower Street climbing away from the riverside.

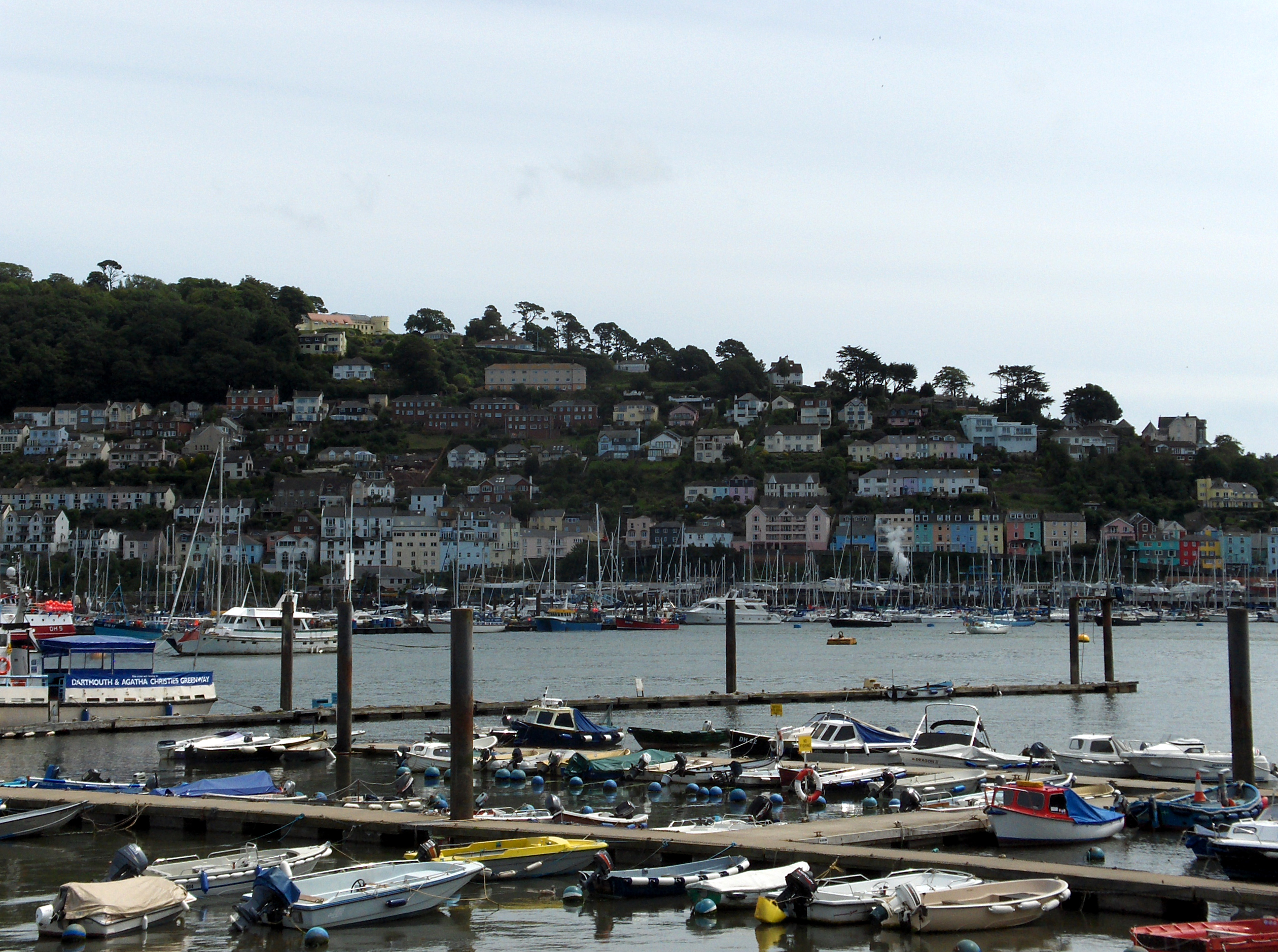
Kinsgwear, seen across the River Dart from Dartmouth

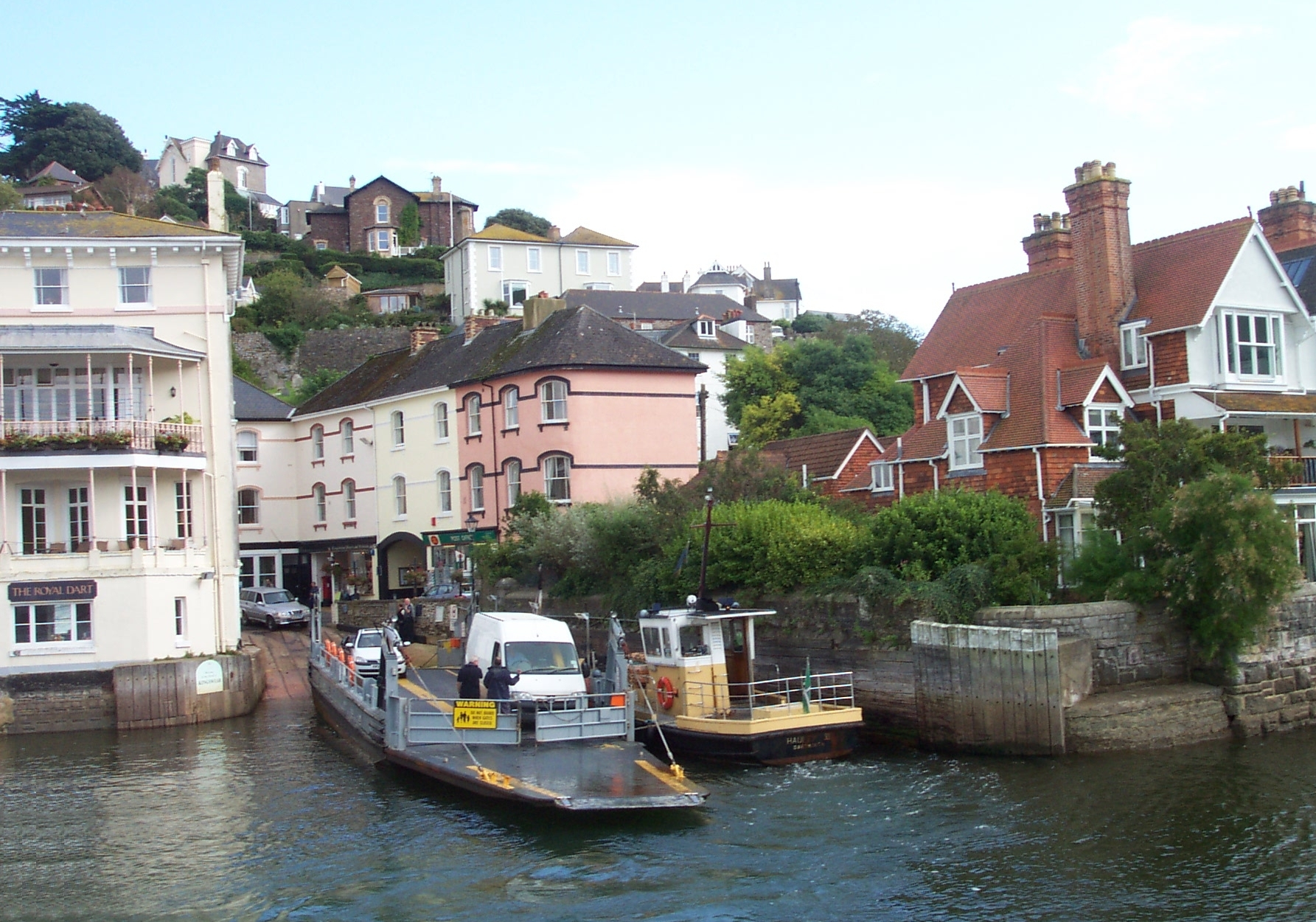
The Dartmouth Lower Ferry at its Kingswear slip, with the Royal Dart Hotel to the left

Kingswear is not mentioned in the Domesday Book. However, it is believed that the settlement of Kingston, in the civil parish about 1 mile (1.6 km) to the east of the village, dates from the time of the Anglo-Saxons, with evidence of Stone Age settlers. The first documentary mention of Kingswear was c.1170 when William de Vinci gave the local church half of the land in the village.

After the murder of Thomas Becket in 1170, Becket's tomb in Canterbury became a place of pilgrimage. Pilgrims travelling by sea from further west, and from Brittany, were known to use Kingswear as a landing place. The current church was built, and dedicated to St Thomas, as a staging point on the pilgrim route. The church was rebuilt in 1847.

By 1365 a ferry was operating from Kittery Point, the westernmost tip of Kingswear, to Dartmouth. In 1636, settlers sailed from here to the mouth of the Piscataqua River in North America to found the town now known as Kittery, Maine.

In 1864 the Dartmouth and Torbay Railway reached Kingswear, providing connections to Exeter and London. The line became part of the Great Western Railway in 1876. The planned extension across the river to Dartmouth never took place, and instead rail passengers used a railway-owned ferry. The Royal Dart Hotel was constructed adjacent to the station, and provided accommodation for passengers waiting to sail to overseas destinations.

In the second half of the 19th century the Kingswear Regatta was held over two days in the summer. It was reestablished in 2006 and has been held annually since.

During the Second World War the Royal Dart Hotel became HMS Cicala and headquarters of the British 15th Destroyer Flotilla. Journeys were made from there to the northern beaches of Brittany, landing agents and equipment for the French Resistance and bringing back escaping allied soldiers and airmen. The Free French Navy operated motor launches and motor torpedo boats from Kingswear and was based in Brookhill, a large house dating from about 1820 on the outskirts of the village.

In 1948 the railway became the Kingswear branch of the newly nationalised British Rail, but by 1968 the closure of the line was being proposed. Instead, the line was purchased by a private company. Since 1973, the line has operated a seasonal steam operated service, principally as a tourist attraction. The line is now known as the Paignton and Dartmouth Steam Railway.

In 2007 the village briefly figured in the national press when the parish council co-opted British National Party member Peter Pirnie as a councillor. He resigned after a row broke out over his party affiliation.

== Demographics ==
As of the year 2001, the parish had a population of 1,332. The equivalent figures for 1801 and 1901 are 300 and 841, and the figure for 2001 is the highest census return over the last 200 years.

== Transport ==
Kingswear railway station is located on the river front in the centre of Kingswear, and is the terminus of the Dartmouth Steam Railway, a seasonally operated heritage railway. The nearest National Rail stations are Totnes station, on the main line from Exeter to Plymouth, and Paignton station, the terminus of a branch from Newton Abbot. The steam railway's Paignton terminus is adjacent to the National Rail station. Bus services operated by Stagecoach connect Kingswear with Brixham and Paignton, and other bus services in Dartmouth can be reached by ferry. It was intended to build a station in Dartmouth as part of a proposed continuation towards Plymouth but when the railway could not cross the Dart, they built a terminus in Kingswear instead and the line to Plymouth from Newton Abbot was routed via Totnes and South Brent. The Station Cafe in Dartmouth was originally Dartmouth Station which was built when the new embankment was opened in 1885. The village is also served by Greenway Halt railway station, also on the Dartmouth Steam Railway.

Kingswear is linked to Dartmouth, on the other side of the River Dart, by three ferries. The Higher Ferry and the Lower Ferry are both vehicular ferries. The Passenger Ferry, as its name suggests, carries only passengers. The nearest bridge across the Dart is in Totnes, some 12 miles (19 km) away by road.

The 630-mile (1,010 km) long South West Coast Path crosses from Dartmouth on the ferry and then follows the coast around towards Brixham.

== Films and television ==
In recent history, Kingswear and the River Dart were used as filming locations for the films The French Lieutenant's Woman, Ordeal by Innocence and the television series The Onedin Line, where Kingswear represented the New World and Dartmouth the Old World, thus giving rise to the comments of the local tour guides that this was the shortest ever crossing of the Atlantic. Kingswear also figured in Down to Earth, though mainly for shots of neighbouring Dartmouth.

== Gallery ==
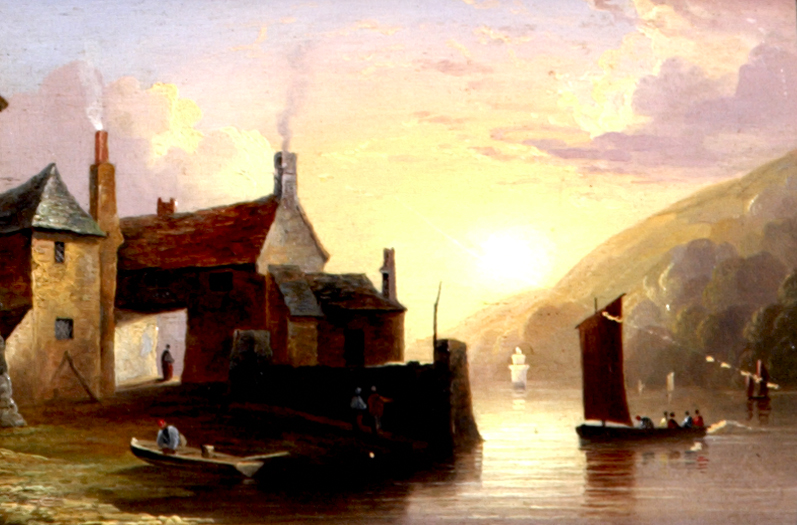
Kingswear on the River Dart, oil painting by John Wallace Tucker, between 1865 and 1867

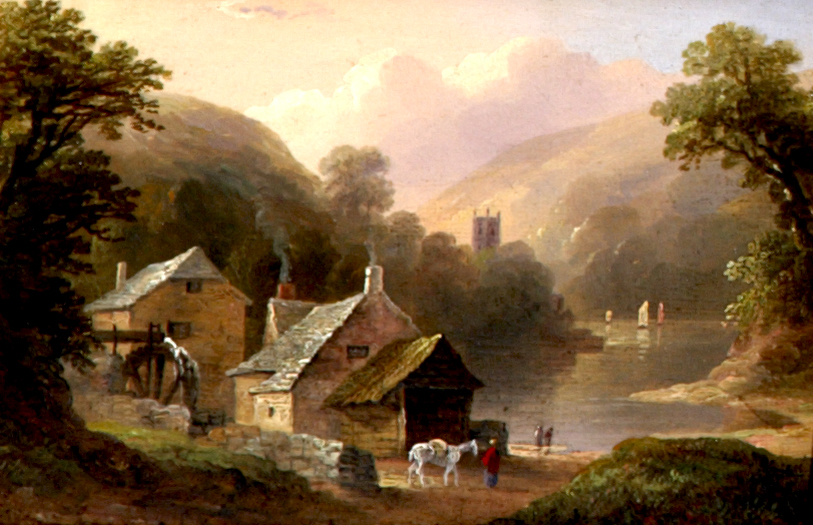
Kingswear Mills on the River Dart, oil painting by John Wallace Tucker, between 1865 and 1867
