= Brixham =

Town in Devon, England

Coordinates: 50.394°N 3.516°W

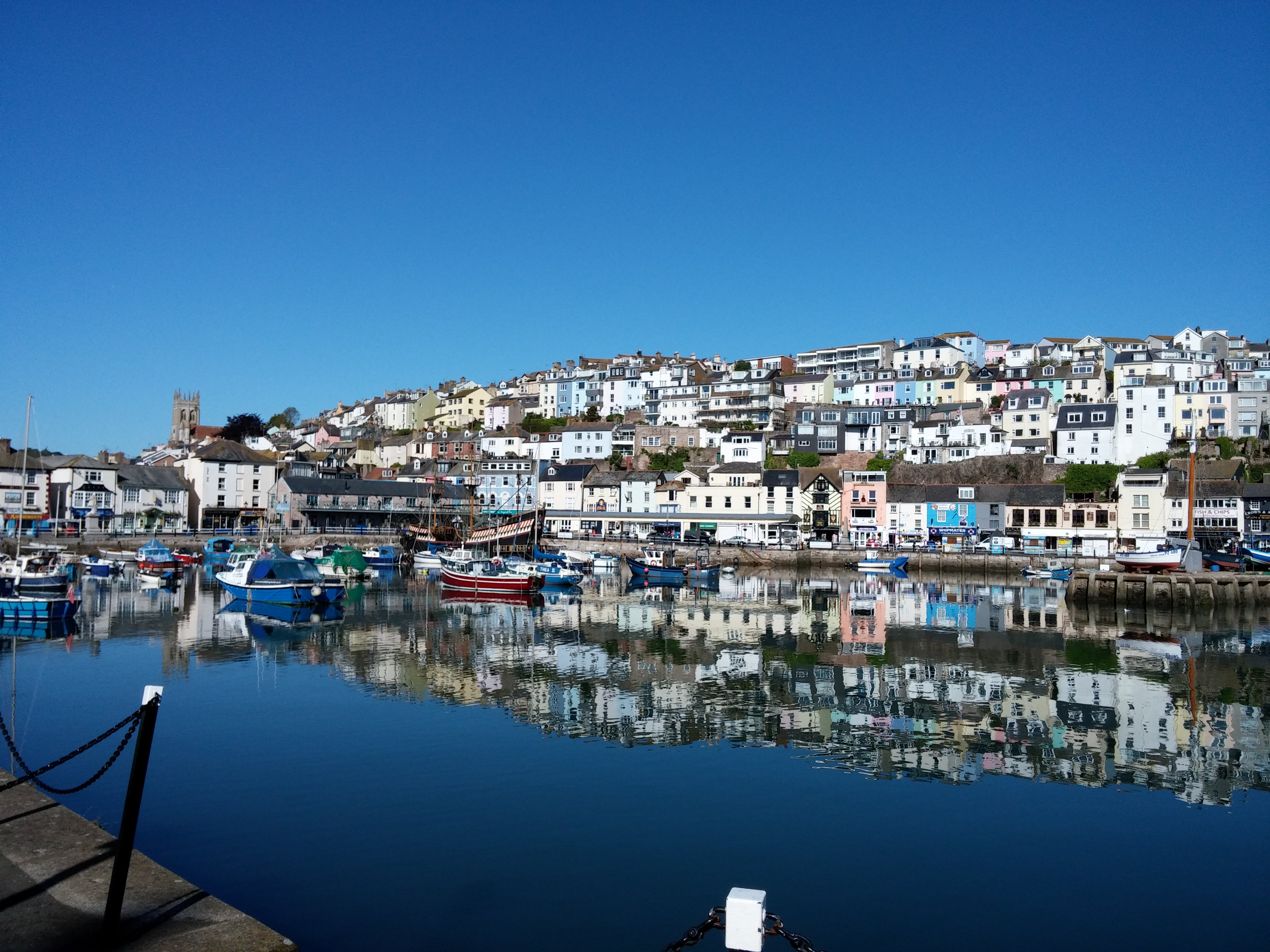
- Brixham Harbour

- Coat of Arms of Brixham

- Location within Devon
- Population: 16,825 (2021 Census)
- OS grid reference: SX9255
- Civil parish: Brixham
- Unitary authority: Torbay
- Ceremonial county: Devon
- Region: South West
- Country: England
- Sovereign state: United Kingdom
- Post town: BRIXHAM
- Postcode district: TQ5
- Dialling code: 01803
- Police: Devon and Cornwall
- Fire: Devon and Somerset
- Ambulance: South Western
- UK Parliament: South Devon

Brixham /ˈbrɪksəm/ is a coastal town and civil parish in the borough of Torbay in the county of Devon, in the south-west of England. As of the 2021 census, Brixham had a population of 16,825. It is one of the main three centres of the borough, along with Paignton and Torquay.

It is believed that the townsname Brixham originates from the personal name of an early resident, Brioc (pronounced BREE-ohk), followed by the Old English word for home, ham, therefore originally meaning "Brioc's home". The town, which is predominantly hilly, is built around a natural harbour which, in addition to leisure craft, provides anchorage for what is now one of England's (but not the UK's) largest remaining commercial fishing fleets. A conspicuous local tourist attraction is the permanently moored replica of Sir Francis Drake's ship Golden Hind.

Historically, Brixham was made up of two separate communities connected by a marshy lane. In Fishtown, in the immediate vicinity of the harbour, the residents made a living mainly from fishing and related trades, as the name suggests. Cowtown, one mile (1.6 km) inland in the vicinity of what is now St Mary's Square, made its living from agriculture. Cowtown is on the road out of town to the south-west in the direction of Kingswear. St Mary's Square is overlooked by a sizeable church standing on the site of a Saxon original.

On 5 November 1688, the Dutch stadtholder William of Orange landed in Brixham with 40,000 soldiers, sailors, and volunteers, before marching on London, where he was crowned King William III as part of the Glorious Revolution.

== History ==
The first evidence of settlement dates from the Saxon period, it being possible that settlers arrived by sea from Hampshire in the 6th century or overland in about the year 800.

Brixham was recorded in the Domesday Book of 1086 as Briseham with a population of 39.

Brixham was part of the former Haytor Hundred. In 1334, the town's value was assessed as being one pound, twelve shillings and eightpence. William de Whithurst, a distinguished Crown official and judge in Ireland, became parish priest of Brixham in 1350. By 1524 Brixham's value had risen to £24 and sixteen shillings. In 1536 the town was recorded as being a borough, but the status was later lost. The presence of a market is recorded from 1822.

The oldest and largest of Brixham's two Anglican churches is St. Mary's, approximately one mile (1.6 km) inland from the sea in the area of the town once known as Cowtown. The present church, dating from approximately 1360, is the third to occupy the site (an ancient Celtic burial place), the first and second having been a Saxon building of wooden construction and a Norman one of stone respectively.

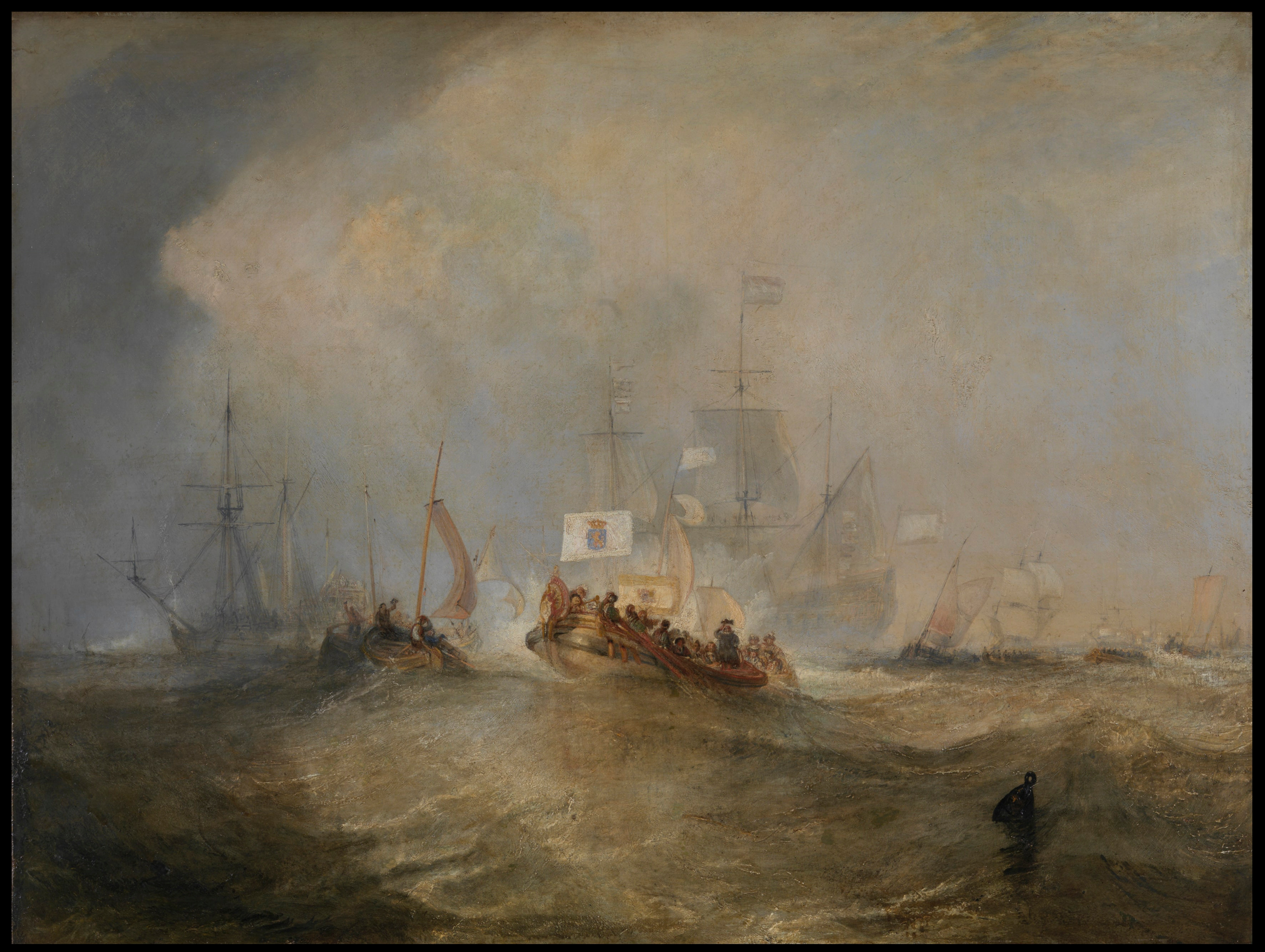
The Prince of Orange Landing at Torbay by Turner, 1832

On 5 November 1688, the invasion force of the Dutch prince, William of Orange landed in Brixham, with more than 30,000 soldiers, sailors and volunteers, prior to marching on London to be crowned King William III as part of the Glorious Revolution. There is a statue and commemorative plaque marking the event close to the Golden Hind replica in the Inner Harbour, while a road at the other end of the harbour, which leads up a steep hill to where the Dutch made their camp, is still called Overgang, Dutch for passage or crossing.

Built in around 1736, Brixham boasts what is believed to be the world's only coffin-shaped house, the story going that its unusual design results from an argument between a father and his prospective son-in-law. Upon being asked for his daughter's hand in marriage, the father answered that, "I would rather see my daughter in a coffin than married to you." Not to be so easily discouraged, the prospective husband promised that the father's wishes would be met and built the coffin-shaped house, his action so impressing the bride's father that the latter gave his blessings to the marriage.

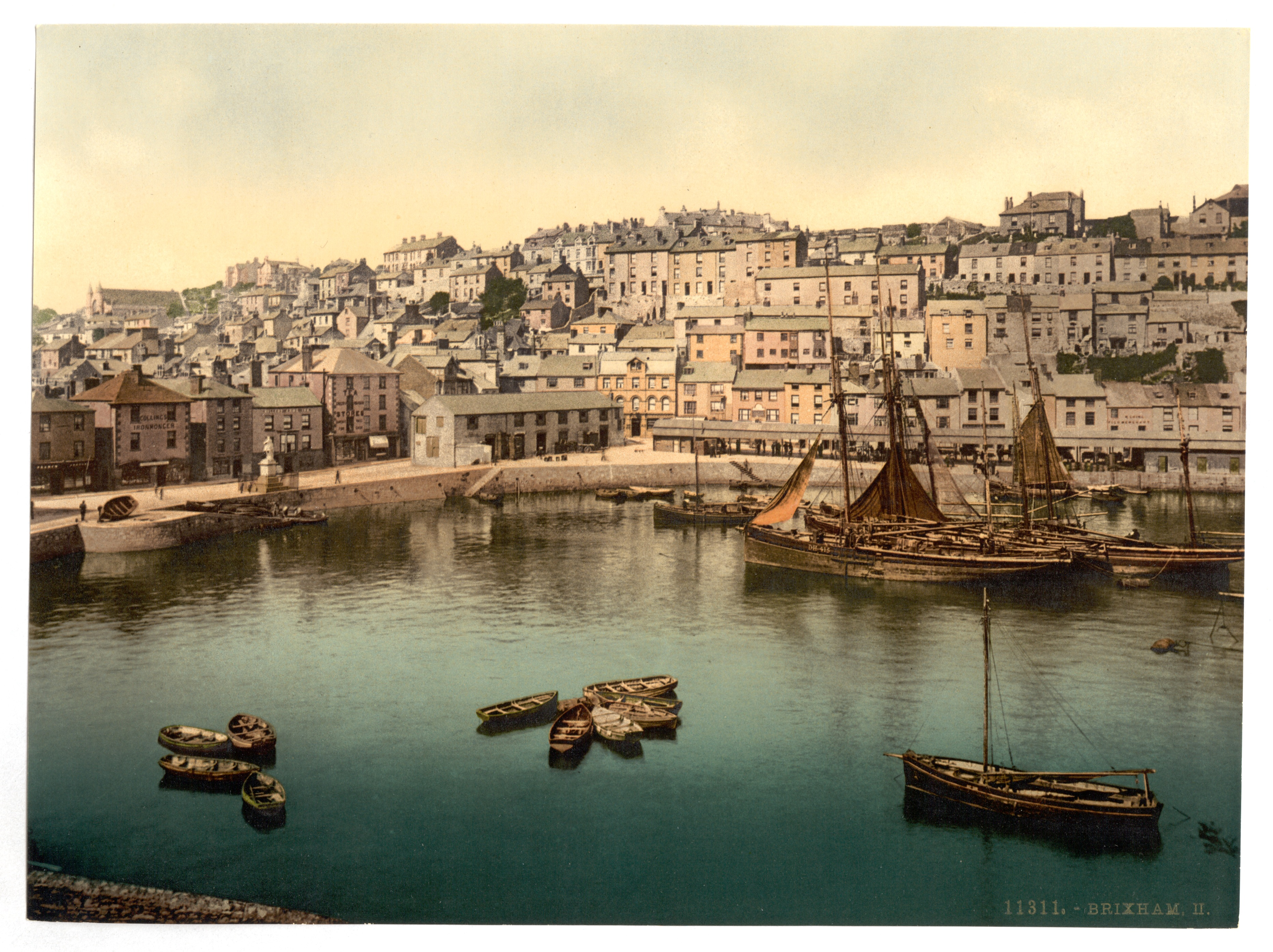
Brixham, England c. 1895

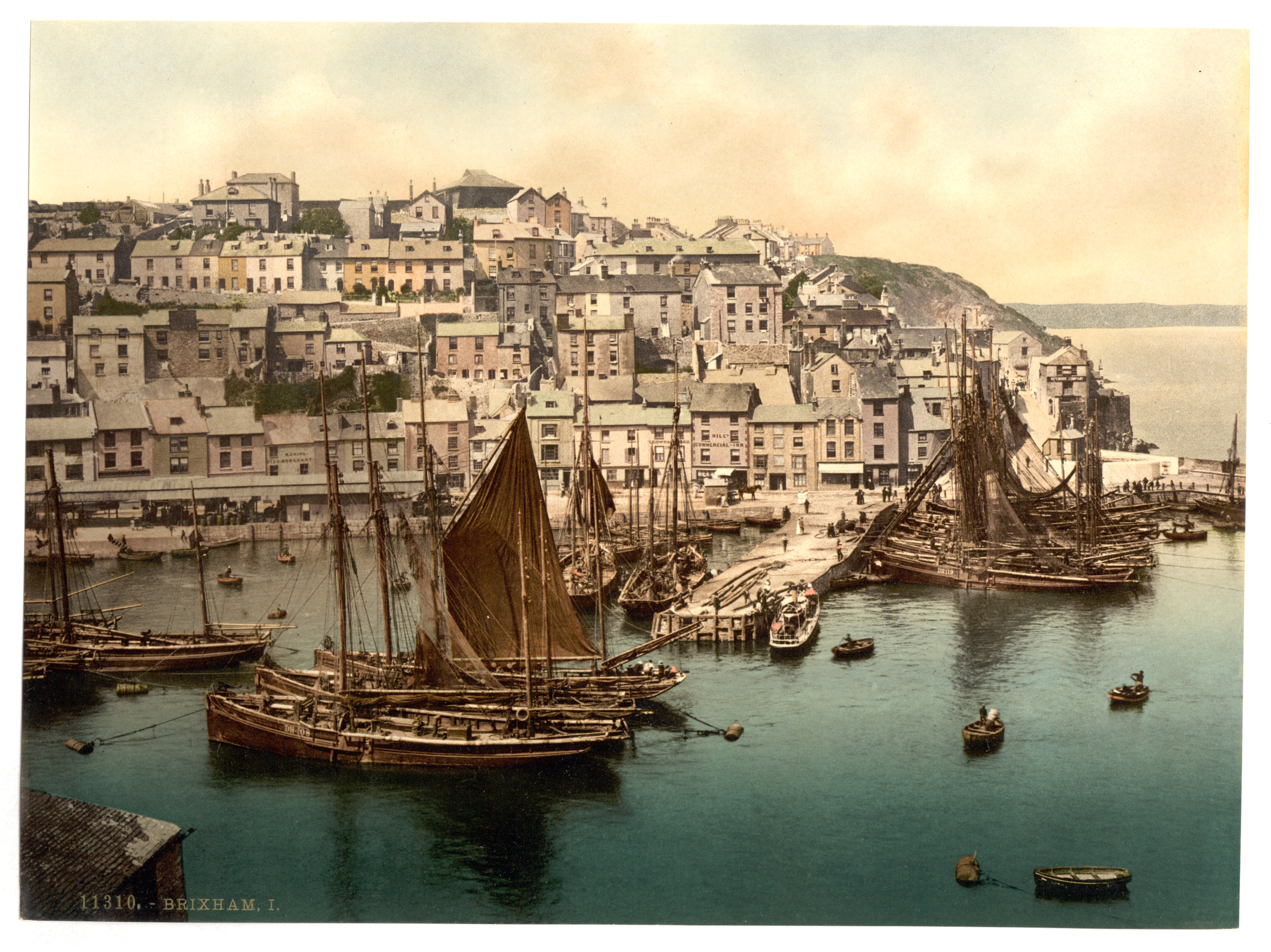
Brixham Harbour c. 1895

Built in 1815, the tower of All Saints' Church is a prominent landmark overlooking the centre of Brixham. Vicar of this church from 1824 to his death in 1847, though much absent because of ill health, was the Rev. Francis Lyte, who is well known for the writing, in the last weeks of his life, of the famous hymn Abide With Me at his home, Berry Head House, (now Brixham's largest hotel) on the north-eastern edge of the town.

Most of the small picturesque terraced cottages built during the nineteenth century and earlier, along the narrow streets overlooking Brixham Harbour were occupied by fishermen and their families and others involved in related trades such as boatbuilding and sailmaking, while housing further away from the harbour in Cowtown and Higher Brixham tends to date from between the 1930s and the 1970s.

Opened in 1863, the British Seaman's Boys' Home was established in Brixham by William Gibbs of Tyntesfield for the bringing up and education of orphaned sons of deceased British seamen. It was closed in 1988 and the building it once occupied, Grenville House in Berry Head Road, is now an outdoor education centre.

On the night of 10/11 January 1866, Brixham was subjected to a storm of unusual severity, which, after the wind had veered to the east around midnight, a direction from which Torbay is not well sheltered, sank at least eleven local trawlers and a visiting French boat. Four Brixham fishermen were drowned. Much greater damage was done to the large number of vessels, at least 62 in number, some by the standards of the time quite large ships, en route to other ports which had sought shelter in Torbay from the storm. Forty of these ships were driven from their anchors and for the most part wrecked along three miles (4.8 km) of the local coastline. It is not known how many of their crew members and passengers were killed; the committee set up to help the victims of the disaster estimated that at least 70 had died, while other sources, in particular contemporary newspaper accounts, made claims of more than 150 fatalities. A memorial marking a mass grave in St Mary's Churchyard memorializes 25 unidentified victims and four named ones. The estimated financial cost of vessel and cargo losses ranges between £150,000 (equivalent to £20 million in 2022) and £200,000 (£26.5 million in 2022).

A direct result of this disaster was that, thanks to money raised by the citizens of Exeter, Brixham acquired its first Royal National Lifeboat Institution (RNLI) lifeboat, and has maintained a lifeboat station ever since. To date Brixham lifeboat crews (all volunteers) have been awarded 26 awards for bravery.

Brixham was joined to the railway network in February 1868 by the short Torbay and Brixham Railway which carried both passengers and goods (particularly fish), but the line, rendered progressively less and less commercially viable by the expansion of the road transport network in the course of the twentieth century, finally fell victim in 1963 to the Beeching cuts and the course of the old line, though still recognisable in places, has largely been built over, as has the site of Brixham railway station.

Due to Brixham's increasing popularity as a tourist destination following the Second World War, a number of holiday camps were built, for example Pontin's Wall Park and Dolphin camps, the latter being one of the company's biggest. It closed in 1991 after its main entertainment complex was destroyed by fire and the site has now been redeveloped with residential housing.

On the morning of 3 September 1973, a Jodel D. 117 G-AVEI light aircraft crashed due to engine failure on a residential bungalow in Higher Ranscombe Road, Brixham, killing its twenty-five year old pilot and his two small children. His wife, though very seriously injured, survived.

=== Maritime ===
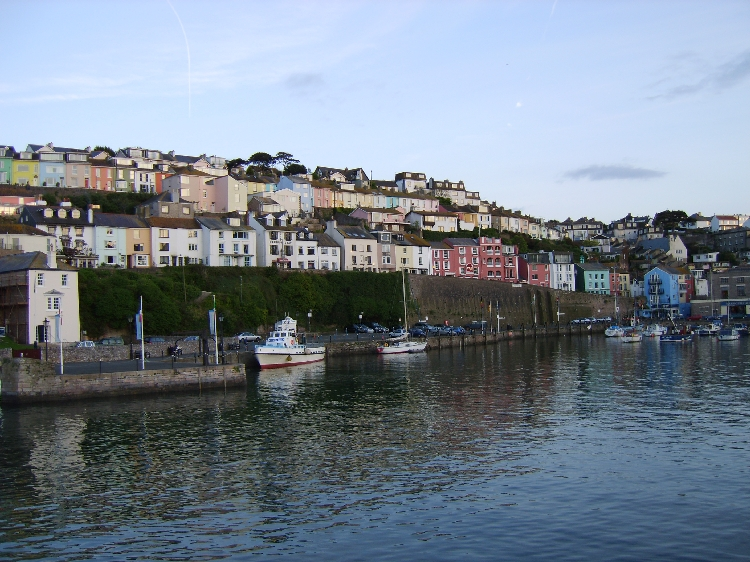
Looking west across Brixham Harbour

There has probably been fishing in Brixham in one form or another from the settlement's very beginnings in the Saxon period. When this developed into a recognisable industry no one any longer knows, but by 1406 it had grown sufficiently large to warrant regulation by the Bailiff of the Water of the Dart, an officer of the Duchy of Cornwall, a legacy of this being that up until 1902 Brixham fishing boats were registered at Dartmouth rather than their actual home port.

Due to being sheltered from the prevailing south-westerly winds, over the course of the fifteenth and sixteenth centuries Brixham became Torbay's largest town and main fishing port, hake being the principal fish landed. Trawl fishing was first recorded in south Devon in the 1760s with high value deep water species such as turbot, sole and plaice being landed. As a result of the development of the turnpike road system during the rest of the eighteenth century, the transportation of fish to markets in Exeter, Bath and even London became economically viable, this trend being substantially enhanced in the nineteenth century with the coming of the railways, although Brixham itself, not getting its own railway station until 1868, was relatively late to fully benefit from this process. During the 1820s over 120 tons on average of turbot and sole was being landed per week by a Brixham fleet of about ninety trawlers exploiting fish stocks as far west as the Irish and Welsh coasts and eastwards along the Channel as far as Hastings and Dover. Migration of Brixham fishing families up the North Sea coast led to the establishment of new fleets in Grimsby and Hull.

In time these ports would grow significantly larger than Brixham, but in the middle of the nineteenth century the town still boasted the largest fishing fleet in England, with more than 250 boats keeping well over 1,000 fishermen in employment. Catches consisted of flounder, gurnard, herring, mullet, plaice, sole, turbot and whiting, the best quality fish being sent to Exeter, Bath, Bristol and London. From 1868, once Brixham had finally been connected directly to the rail network, fish landed in the port could be delivered to London's Billingsgate Fish Market in eight hours as opposed to three days by road.

In parallel with this expansion, over the course of the century, a major boat and shipbuilding industry grew up in the town, numerous boatyards lining the shore and catering both for the local demand for new boats and that from ports further afield. For much of the century, these yards also turned their hand to building ocean-going schooners for the fiercely competitive fruit trade with the Azores.

Other maritime trades such as sail, rope and net-making were needed as well and became a conspicuous feature of the Brixham townscape, forming an important part of the local economy in their own right.

In 1900, Brixham even had its own ice factory, a much needed addition to the town, given the large quantities of ice required to keep catches fresh and the somewhat precarious method of supply available previously, from 1869 onwards it having been imported from Stavanger in Norway, carried aboard fast sailing ships capable of making the passage in just four days. Despite their speed, in the summer months half the cargo would typically be lost to melting in transit.

However, reluctant and unable on financial grounds to replace sailing trawlers with faster and more powerful steam-powered ones, from the 1890 onwards and into the early twentieth century, Brixham's fishing industry went into decline, in particular being unable to compete with North Sea ports such as Lowestoft and Grimsby in the lucrative Dogger Bank fishing grounds. This decline was further compounded by the outbreak of World War One in 1914 and the resultant loss of fishing boats to U-boat attack and trawler crews being called upon for military service. The inter-war years proved no better. In 1928 only 2160 tons of fish were landed at Brixham, compared to 94,000 at Hull, and by the outbreak of World War Two in 1939 the Brixham fishing fleet had dwindled to only six boats.

The arrival during World War Two of refugee fishermen from Belgium helped to revitalise the fishing industry and brought with it a much needed knowledge of diesel engines.

A definite upturn in the industry's fortunes was seen in 1960 following the adoption of larger trawlers from the Netherlands and by 1966 the fishing fleet had grown to 45 boats. In 1969 the fleet had grown to 70 boats with £247,000 worth of fish being landed at Brixham and over the next two decades £4.6 million was invested in infrastructure projects such as building a new fish market and ice plant. In 1991 more than 800 people were employed directly or indirectly within the industry. In 2000 Brixham became England's premier fishing port, landing a total of £18.4 million worth of fish. In 2021 £43.6 million worth of fish was landed.

The modern boats are diesel-driven, but a few of the famous old sailing trawlers have been preserved. Owned by not for profit organisations and registered as historic vessels on the National Historic Ships register it is possible to sail on these big wooden built, red sailed boats. They depend on income from guests to keep them sailing, such as Pilgrim of Brixham (1895) and Vigilance of Brixham (1926).

Hundreds of ships have been wrecked on the rocks around the town. Brixham men have always known the dangers but even they were taken by surprise by a terrible storm that blew up on the night of 10 January 1866. The fishing boats only had sails then and could not get back into harbour because gale-force winds and the high waves were against them. To make things worse, the beacon on the breakwater was swept away, and in the black darkness they could not determine their position. According to local legend, their wives brought everything they could carry, including furniture and bedding, to make a big bonfire on the quayside to guide their men home. Fifty vessels were wrecked and more than one hundred people died in the storm; when dawn broke, the wreckage stretched for nearly three miles (5 km) up the coast.

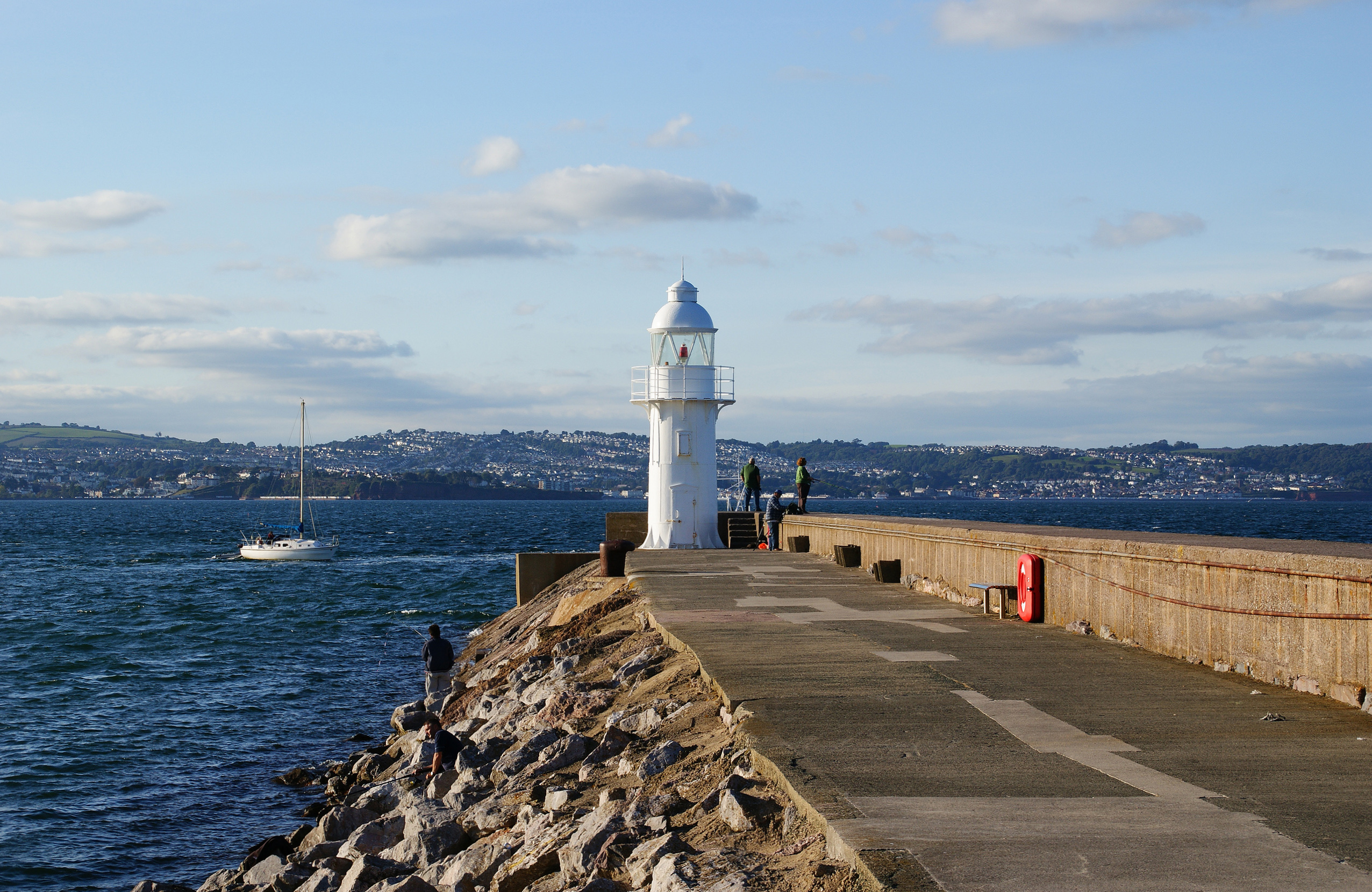
Brixham breakwater and lighthouse

Hearing of this tragedy, the citizens of Exeter gave money to set up what became the Royal National Lifeboat Institution's Brixham Lifeboat in 1866. Now known as Torbay Lifeboat Station, it operates a Severn-class all-weather lifeboat and a D-class (IB1) inshore lifeboat. The crews have a history of bravery, with 52 awards for gallantry. The boathouse can be visited and memorials to the brave deeds seen; on special occasions, visitors can go on board the boat. Two maroons (bangs) are the signal for the lifeboat to be launched.

Smuggling was more profitable than fishing, but if the men were caught, they were hanged. There are many legends about the local gangs and how they evaded the Revenue men. One humorous poem describes how a notorious local character, Bob Elliott ("Resurrection Bob"), could not run away because he had gout and hid in a coffin. Another villain was caught in possession but evaded capture by pretending to be the Devil, rising out of the morning mists. On another occasion when there was a cholera epidemic, some Brixham smugglers drove their cargo up from the beach in a hearse, accompanied by a bevy of supposed mourners following the cortege drawn by horses with muffled hooves.

The town's outer harbour is protected by a long breakwater, useful for sea angling. In winter, this is a site for purple sandpiper birds.

To the east of Brixham, and sheltering its harbour, lies the coastal headland of Berry Head with a lighthouse, Iron Age fort and national nature reserve.

=== Military ===
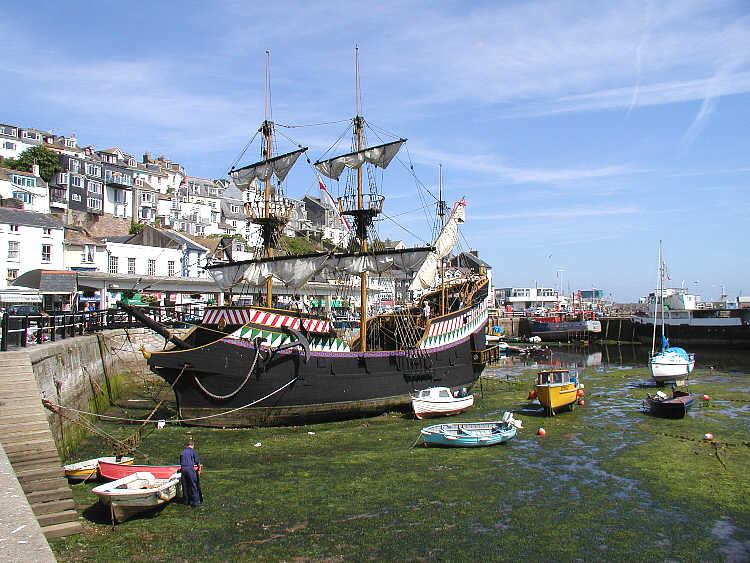
The replica of Golden Hind in Brixham harbour

From at least the reign of Elizabeth I to World War Two Torbay was a militarily important site due to its sheltered anchorage, being of particular important in the late eighteenth century when Brixham functioned as the Royal Navy's victualling station for the Western Approaches. This role was of particular importance during the American War of Independence of 1775 to 1783.

It is known that a battery of cannons was established as a defensive measure against the threat of attack by Spain in the area now known as Battery Gardens as long ago as 1586 and was continuously maintained until 1664.

The battery was reactivated in November 1688 when William, Prince of Orange's army landed in Brixham and camped on Furzeham Common, guns being positioned to protect the fleet, the town and the road to the town of Paignton, five miles (8 km) away.

When France allied itself with America in 1778 and with Spain in 1779, the Board of Ordnance (the equivalent in its day of today's Ministry of Defence) decided that, in conjunction with other naval stations along the English south coast, Brixham was to be protected by gun emplacements, the battery on the Battery Gardens site being the most westerly protecting the town.

Between 1794 and 1804 two substantial fortified garrisons were constructed on the site of a Saxon hill fort at Berry Head, an elevated site to the east of Brixham. A third fort had been planned, but was never built. The forts were maintained as important defensive positions during the Napoleonic Wars though never fired their cannons in anger, and slowly fell into military disuse during the course of the rest of the nineteenth century, now forming part of the Berry Head National Nature Reserve.

In July 1815, the British Royal Navy warship, HMS Bellerophon, spent a week anchored off of Brixham, the former French emperor, Napoleon Bonaparte, being held on board as a prisoner following his capture after the Battle of Waterloo. His presence on board, quickly becoming known to the local populace, the ship briefly became a major tourist attraction. He spent a total of three weeks off the Devon coast while the UK authorities decided what to do with Bonaparte. He was then transferred to another ship, HMS Northumberland, and taken to St. Helena, his final place of exile.

Brixham was not directly targeted by enemy action during World War 1; though, out at sea, approximately 10% of the town's fishing fleet, numbering about 300 vessels at the time was lost either to submarine attack or collision with mines, four boats alone being sunk in a U-boat attack in a single day in 1917. During the war there was no loss of life among fishing crews, but those who enlisted in the military were not so fortunate and the town's war memorial lists the names of 216 local residents who died in the conflict.

During World War 2 Brixham was sporadically subjected to small scale hit and run air raids seventeen times between July 1940 and May 1943 with two raids, in May 1941 and May 1942 each resulting in a single fatality respectively. London City, a coaling hulk moored in the outer harbour, and ironically originally a German ship seized after the end of World War 1, was sunk and raised twice in July 1940 and February 1941 respectively, only to be sunk again in March 1942 and this time not raised until being salvaged for scrap years after the war. The names of 125 local residents are listed on Brixham's war memorial as having died on military service during World War 2.

The town also saw an American military presence during the war, with slipways being built in May 1943 for training exercises for US forces. 2,500 men of the US 4th Infantry Division and 32 amphibious DD tanks embarked on 4 June 1944 for Utah Beach as part of the D-Day landings against German-occupied France.

=== Industrial ===
Limestone was quarried at Berry Head on the edge of Brixham from the mid 18th century until the 1960s, the stone being used both for agricultural lime and for building stone. At first stone was taken from both sides of the headland, but following a short period of closure due to concerns about undermining the fort's defences in 1828, quarrying was allowed on the north (Torbay facing) side of the headland only and by the quarry's final closure in 1969 a substantial quantity of Berry Head North Fort had been removed. The remains of the quarry are for the most part still accessible to the public and the former loading jetty is a popular venue for sea angling with locals and holidaymakers alike.

Historically iron was also mined close to Brixham, the last mine closing in 1925. With the exception of remnants of the Sharkham Point Iron Mine, there are now no extant remains of this industry.

Another mineral found in Brixham is ochre. This gave the old fishing boats their red sails, but the purpose was to protect the canvas from sea water. It was boiled in great cauldrons, together with tar, tallow and oak bark. The latter ingredient gave its name to the barking yards which were places where the hot mixture was painted on to the sails, which were then hung up to dry. The ochre was also used to make a paint. This was invented in Brixham in about 1845, and was the first substance in the world that would stop cast iron from rusting. Other types of paint were made here as well, and the works were in existence until 1961.

== Festivals and events ==
Brixham plays host to a number of festivals and events throughout the calendar year. These events are run entirely by locals and contribute significantly to the local economy.

=== Brixham Pirate Festival ===
The annual Brixham Pirate Festival usually takes place over the early May Bank Holiday, and is known for its world record attempts, live music, free entertainment and for filling Brixham with pirates. The festival is a very large event in the town, with thousands of residents and visitors attending the festival yearly.

=== BrixFest ===
BrixFest is an annual family friendly festival in Brixham, that usually takes place in May each year.

=== Fishstock Brixham ===
Fishstock Brixham is a one-day annual seafood and live music festival held in aid of the Fishermen's Mission (RNMDSF). It is a licensed event, organised by volunteers and held inside the new Fish Market Development on the harbour side. Normally the event is held on the second Saturday of September, but the date also varies for Spring tides.

== Governance ==
Brixham Town Council

Type
- Type: Civil parish

History
- Founded: 1 April 2007

Leadership
- Mayor: Michael Roseveare, Independent
- Deputy Mayor: Paul Addison, Independent

Structure
- Seats: 12
- Political groups: Independents: 12 seats
- Length of term: 4 years
- Salary: None

Elections
- Voting system: First-past-the-post
- Last election: 4 May 2023 (uncontested)
- Next election: 6 May 2027

Meeting place
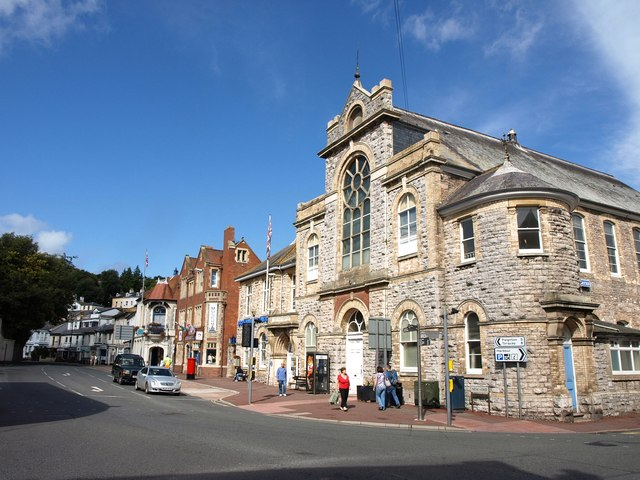
- Brixham Town Hall, New Road, Brixham, TQ5 8TA

Website
- https://www.brixhamtowncouncil.gov.uk/

There are two tiers of local government covering Brixham, at parish (town) and unitary authority level: Brixham Town Council and Torbay Council, based in Torquay. Brixham Town Council is based at the Town Hall on New Road.

Brixham was an ancient parish. By the 1860s the parish contained two main settlements, being Lower Brixham around the harbour and Higher Brixham on higher ground to the south around the parish church. The larger settlement of Lower Brixham was made a local government district in 1862, governed by a local board. Prior to that the whole parish had been administered by its vestry in the same way as most rural areas. Higher Brixham and the rural parts of the parish continued to be governed by the vestry until 1894. The local board built itself the Town Hall on New Road in 1886 to serve as its headquarters and as a market hall and public hall.

Local boards were converted into urban district councils in December 1894, and the Lower Brixham Urban District was enlarged at the same time to cover the whole parish of Brixham. In recognition of the enlargement, at the second meeting of the urban district council in January 1895 it voted to change its name from Lower Brixham to just Brixham.

In 1968 the urban districts of Brixham and Paignton, the municipal borough of Torquay and the parish of Churston Ferrers were all abolished. A county borough called Torbay was created to cover the whole area, with some adjustments of the boundaries to neighbouring parishes at the same time, including the more rural southern part of Brixham being transferred to the parish of Kingswear. As a county borough, Torbay was administratively independent from Devon County Council. Six years later, in 1974, local government was reformed again, with Torbay becoming a non-metropolitan district and Devon County Council providing county-level services to the area again. Torbay regained its independence from the county council in 1998 when it was made a unitary authority. Torbay remains part of the ceremonial county of Devon for the purposes of lieutenancy.

From 1968 to 2007 Brixham was directly administered by Torbay Borough Council, having no lower-tier authority of its own. On 1 April 2007 a new civil parish of Brixham was created, with its council declaring the new parish to be a town and adopting the name Brixham Town Council. In 2011 ownership of Brixham Town Hall was transferred from Torbay Council to Brixham Town Council to use as its headquarters.

Brixham is part of the UK parliamentary constituency of South Devon, whose MP has been Caroline Voaden since 2024.

== Education ==
Brixham has a number of schools, mostly located in the centre of residential areas.

The town has one secondary school, Brixham College.

Other schools and academies in Brixham and the surrounding area include

- Eden Park Primary School Academy
- Brixham Church of England Primary School
- Saint Margaret Clitherow Catholic Primary School
- Furzeham Primary School

== Media ==
Local TV coverage is provided by BBC South West and ITV West Country. Television signals are received from the Beacon Hill TV transmitter and the local relay transmitter.

Local radio stations are BBC Radio Devon on 104.3 FM, Heart West on 96.4 FM, Greatest Hits Radio South West (formerly The Breeze) on 105.5 FM, Radio Exe Devon on DAB, and Riviera FM, a community based station which broadcast to the town on 107.9 FM.

The town is served by the local newspaper, Herald Express which publishes on Thursdays.

== Sport ==
Brixham is home to the Brixham Archers. This is the biggest archery club in the bay and shoots outdoors at their field at Churston. Brixham Archers also use an indoor facility in Brixham. The Archery club was formed in 1969 and has been successful at county and national level competitions.

In 1874, Brixham Rugby Club was founded and became one of the founder members of Devon RFU of which six clubs are now left. They played Rugby on Furzeham Green until 1896 when they moved their present ground to New Gate Park (now Astley Park). The club will play their league fixtures in the National League 3 South West division of English rugby.

Footballer Dan Gosling, currently of Westfield F.C., was born and raised in Brixham, and is the fourth-youngest player to have ever played for Plymouth Argyle aged 16 years and 310 days.

Brixham is also home to Brixham AFC who were founded in 2012, following the merger of Brixham United and Brixham Villa football clubs. The club play their home matches at Wall Park Ground and currently play in the Southern League Division One South.

== Transport ==
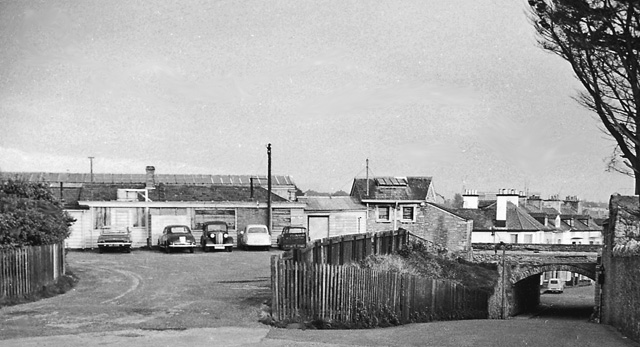
Brixham station entrance in 1964

Brixham railway station was the terminus of the Torbay and Brixham Railway. It served the town from the bay platform at Churston station until the line was closed in 1963. Some of the track bed remains in place. Houses in Harbour View Close were built on the site of the station. The Association of Train Operating Companies included Brixham as one of fourteen towns that, based on 2009 data, would benefit from a new railway service, but restoration is highly unlikely.

Although Brixham is no longer on the rail network, frequent buses taking 25 minutes connect Brixham with the national rail network at Paignton, where the bus station is conveniently situated opposite the rail station. Trains from Paignton run to destinations such as Exeter Central, Exmouth, London Paddington and Birmingham New Street.

Torbay's flagship bus route, Stagecoach South West service 12, operates up to every 10 minutes and has its terminus at Brixham Town Square, with the service returning to Newton Abbot via Paignton, Torquay and Kingskerswell. The service also calls at the Brixham Park and Ride site located on the A3022 (Dartmouth Road). Flat rate parking charges include a bus ride for a car's occupants to Brixham and return.

Stagecoach service 18 take about 15 minutes for the journey from Brixham (Bank Street) to Kingswear, where a river crossing to Dartmouth can be made by ferry.

Local town services operated by both Stagecoach and Country Bus, serve Furzeham, Wall Park, Sharkham, South Bay, Higher Brixham, Summercombe and Hillhead.

There are direct National Express coach services to London via Bristol and Heathrow Airport, and Sheffield via Bristol and Birmingham.

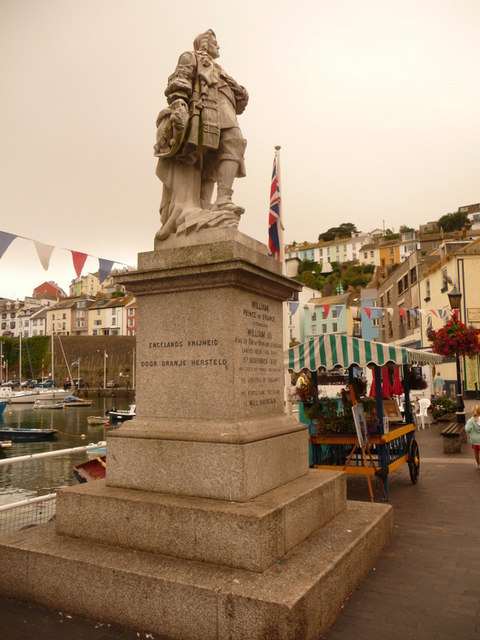
William of Orange statue by the harbour

Frequent ferry services for foot passengers operate from Brixham Harbour to Torquay between the months of April and September, the fastest taking 35 minutes. There are also seasonal ferries to Paignton. Pleasure cruises also call at Brixham Harbour en route from Torquay to Dartmouth, during the spring, summer and autumn.

== Brixham Caverns ==
- Windmill Hill Cavern, also called Brixham Cavern and Philp's Cave
- Ash Hole Cavern

== Monuments ==
- Prince of Orange statue
- Prince of Orange pillar

== Notable people ==
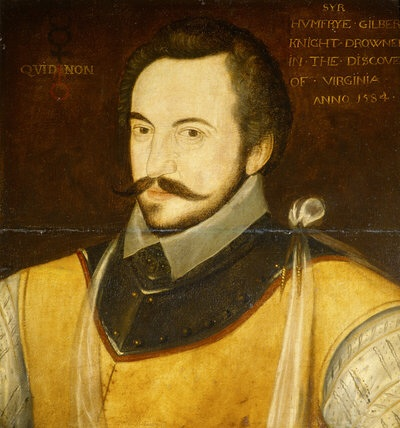
Sir Humphrey Gilbert, ca 1584

- Sir Humphrey Gilbert (c. 1539 – 1583), an adventurer, explorer, MP and soldier.
- Sir Francis Buller, 1st Baronet (1746–1800), an English judge.
- Flora Thompson (1876–1947), novelist and poet, wrote a semi-autobiographical trilogy, Lark Rise to Candleford, died locally
- Honoré Willsie Morrow (1880–1940), American author and magazine editor; lived locally in the 1930's, became the president of Brixham Literary and Debating Society

=== Sport ===
- Bob Brocklebank (1908–1981), football player and manager, he played 140 games, including 121 for Burnley
- Ian Hibell (1934–2008), a touring cyclist who spent nearly 40 years bicycling, he was the first to cycle from Cape Horn to Alaska.
- Leandra Little (born 1984), former footballer who played over 100 games
- Dan Gosling (born 1990), football coach and former player who played over 290 games, including 171 for Bournemouth
