= List of churches in Torbay =

The following is a list of churches in Torbay, Devon, England.

== Active churches ==
The unitary authority has an estimated 65 active churches for 130,959 people, a ratio of one church for every 2,015 inhabitants. Before the eighteenth century there were only five medieval parish churches in the area.

| Name | Neighbourhood | Web | Dedication | Founded | Denomination | Benefice | Notes |
|---|---|---|---|---|---|---|---|
| The Willows Community Church | The Willows | | | | Independent | | |
| St Martin, Barton | Barton | | Martin of Tours | 1928 | Church of England | Mission Community | Anglo-Catholic. Current building 1940, parished 1960 |
| Barton Baptist Church | Barton | | | | Baptist Union | | |
| Hele Road Baptist Church | Hele | | | mid C19th | Baptist Union | | |
| Together Church | Upton | | | | Newfrontiers | | Meets in The Echo Building |
| St Mary the Virgin, St Marychurch | St Marychurch | | Mary | Medieval | Church of England | Mission Community | Bishop of Oswestry. Mostly destroyed by a WW2 bomb & rebuilt |
| Our Lady Help of Christians & St Denis | St Marychurch | | Mary & Denis | 1867-1881 | Roman Catholic | | Grade I listed |
| All Saints, Babbacombe | Babbacombe | | All Saints | 1865-1867 | Church of England | Mission Community | Grade I listed. Bishop of Ebbsfleet |
| Furrough Road United Reformed Church | Babbacombe | | | 1852 | URC | | Originated as a split from the local Anglican church |
| Christ Church, Ellacombe | Ellacombe | | Jesus | 1868 | Church of England | | Church closed for worship |
| Victoria Park Methodist Church, Torquay | Ellacombe | | | 1864 | Methodist | Torbay Methodist Circuit | |
| St Matthias, Ilsham | Torquay | | Matthias | 1857-1858 | Church of England | | |
| St John the Apostle, Torquay | Torquay | | John the Evangelist | 1822 | Church of England | Mission Community | Began as Torquay Chapel of Ease. St John's built, parished 1862 |
| St Luke, Torquay | Torquay | | Luke | 1861 | Church of England | West Torquay Miss. Comm. | Parished 1869 |
| St Mary Magdalene, Upton | Torquay | | Mary Magdalene | 1849 | Church of England | | |
| Assumption of Our Lady, Torquay | Torquay | | Assumption of Mary | 1853-1854 | Roman Catholic | | |
| St Andrew Greek Orth. Church, Torquay | Torquay | | Andrew | 1972 | Greek Orthodox | | Building was once St Saviour's CoE |
| St Petroc's British Orthodox Mission | Torquay | | Petroc | | British Orthodox | | Meets in the Unitarian church |
| Upton Vale Baptist Church | Torquay | | | 1832 | Baptist Union | | Current building 1862-1863 |
| Torbay Central Church | Torquay | | | 1807 | Methodist / URC | Torbay Methodist Circuit | URC & 2 Methodist churches united and built new building 1976 |
| Torquay Salvation Army | Torquay | | | | Salvation Army | | |
| Hebron Gospel Hall | Torquay | | Hebron | | Gospel Hall | | |
| Riviera Christian Centre | Torquay | | | | Elim | | |
| Riviera Life Church | Torquay | | | c. 1970s | Assemblies of God | | Planted from Living Waters Paignton |
| Engage Torbay | Torquay | | | | Hillsong Network | | |
| Torquay Quaker Meeting | Torquay | | | | Quakers | | |
| Torquay Adventist Church | Torquay | | | | 7th-Day Adventist | | |
| Torquay Unitarian Church | Torquay | | | pre-1912 | Unitarian | | Current building 1912 |
| All Saints, Torre | Torre | | All Saints | 1867 | Church of England | West Torquay Miss. Comm. | Bishop of Oswestry. Rebuilt 1886–89 |
| St John the Baptist, Shiphay | Shiphay | | John the Baptist | 1897 | Church of England | | Parished 1956 |
| St Andrew's Methodist Church, Torquay | Shiphay | | Andrew | 1952-1953 | Methodist | Torbay Methodist Circuit | |
| Overcomers House Torquay | Shiphay | | | | RCCG | | Meets in Torquay Boys' Grammar School |
| St Peter, Chelston | Chelston | | Peter | 1954 | Church of England | Cockington | Current building 1962 |
| St Matthew, Chelston | Chelston | | Matthew | 1884 | Church of England | Cockington | Current building 1895 |
| Holy Angels, Chelston | Chelston | | Angels | 1938 | Roman Catholic | | |
| SS George & Mary, Cockington | Cockington | | George & Mary | Medieval | Church of England | Cockington | One of the three ancient medieval parishes of Torquay |
| St Paul, Paignton | Preston | | Paul | c. 1900 | Church of England | Christ Church & St Paul's | First building 1909, rebuilt 1939 |
| Christ Church, Paignton | Paignton | | Jesus | 1888 | Church of England | Christ Church & St Paul's | First church 1886, now the church hall. |
| Preston Baptist Church | Preston | | | 1927 | Baptist Union | | Current building 1939–1940 |
| St Boniface, Paignton | Paignton | | Boniface | | Church of England | Paignton | Church closed pending demolition for flats. |
| St John the Baptist, Paignton | Paignton | | John the Baptist | Medieval | Church of England | Paignton | |
| Bay Church St Andrew, Paignton | Paignton | | Andrew | | Church of England | | Church plant by St Matts Plymouth and others. |
| Sacred Heart & St Teresa of the Child Jesus | Paignton | | Sac Heart, Thérèse of Lis. | 1882 | Roman Catholic | | Current building 1930–1931, reconsecrated 1992 |
| Paignton Baptist Church | Paignton | | | 1830 | Baptist Union | | Current building 1882–1886 |
| Roselands Community Church | Paignton | | | 1990s | Baptist Union | | Planted by local Baptist churches |
| Southfields Methodist Church, Paignton | Paignton | | | 1884 | Methodist | Torbay Methodist Circuit | Building dates from 1818, previously Congregational. Closed as a place of worship. Now called Southfield Christian Centre, home of the Paignton Community Larder. |
| Palace Avenue Methodist Church, Paignton | Paignton | | | 1820s | Methodist | Torbay Methodist Circuit | |
| Paignton Salvation Army | Paignton | | | | Salvation Army | | |
| Living Waters Church, Paignton | Preston | | | 1965 | Assemblies of God | | |
| Gerston Chapel | Paignton | | | 1888 | Independent | | Of Brethren origin |
| Great Parks Chapel | Paignton | | | | Partnership UK | | |
| St Mary the Virgin, Collaton St Mary | Collaton St Mary | | Mary | 1864-1866 | Church of England | Collaton & Goodrington | |
| St George, Goodrington | Goodrington | | George | 1938 | Church of England | Collaton & Goodrington | |
| Goodrington Methodist Church | Goodrington | | | | Methodist | Torbay Methodist Circuit | |
| Good Shepherd Chapel, Galmpton | Galmpton | | Jesus | | Church of England | Brixham | Benefice includes one church in Devon |
| Galmpton Evangelical Congregational Church | Galmpton | | | 1831 | EFCC | | Building called Flavel Chapel |
| St Mary the Virgin, Churston Ferrers | Churston Ferrers | | Mary | | Church of England | Brixham | |
| All Saints, Brixham | Brixham | | All Saints | 1815 | Church of England | Brixham | Residency of Henry Lyte |
| St Mary, Brixham | Brixham | | Mary | Medieval | Church of England | Brixham | |
| Our Lady Star of the Sea, Brixham | Brixham | | Mary | 1967 | Roman Catholic | | Only church with a car park on the roof |
| Brixham Baptist Church | Brixham | | | 1801 | Baptist Union | | Rebuilt 1858 |
| Brixham Methodist Church | Brixham | | | pre-1816 | Methodist | Torbay Methodist Circuit | |
| Brixham United Reformed Church | Brixham | | | | URC | | New building 2009 |
| Brixham Community Church | Brixham | | | c. 1970s | Assemblies of God | | |
| Brixham Salvation Army | Brixham | | | | Salvation Army | | |

== Defunct churches ==
| Name | Neighbourhood | Web | Dedication | Founded | Redundant | Denomination | Notes |
|---|---|---|---|---|---|---|---|
| St Barnabas, Ellacombe | Ellacombe | | Barnabas | 1878 | 1965 | Church of England | |
| St Paul, Ellacombe | Ellacombe | | Paul | 1890 | 1966 | Church of England | |
| St Saviour, Torquay | Torquay | | Jesus | Medieval | 1960s | Church of England | Ancient parish church of Tormoham. Now Grk Orth. Once part of Torre Abbey |
| St Michael & All Angels, Torquay | Torquay | | Michael & Angels | 1875-1877 | 1968 | Church of England | Demolished |
| St Mark, Torwood | Torquay | | Mark | 1856-1857 | 1979 | Church of England | |
| Holy Trinity, Torquay | Torquay | | Trinity | 1830-1831 | 1980 | Church of England | Originally independent, joined CoE 1830s, rebuilt 1894–1896 |
| St James, Upton | Torquay | | James | 1891 | 1965 | Church of England | |
| SS John Fisher & Thomas More, Hele Road | Torquay | | John Fisher, Thomas More | 1935 | pre-2006 | Roman Catholic | Demolished pre-2006 |
| Abbey Road Congregational Church | Torquay | | | 1847 | 1981 | Congregational | Demolished 1982. Merged with Furrough Road URC |
| Cary Street Independent Chapel | Torquay | | | 1833 | 1877 | Congregational | |
| St Andrew's Scottish Presbyterian Church | Torquay | | Andrew | 1863 | 1951 | | |
| St Michael's Church, Paignton | Paignton | | Michael | 1939 | 1979 | Church of England | Preserved chapel still used for services |
| St Peter Chanel, Foxhole Estate | Paignton | | Peter Chanel | 1962 | 1988 | Roman Catholic | |
| Foxhole Grace Baptist Church | Paignton | | | | 2016 | | |
| St Peter, Brixham | Brixham | | Peter | mid C19th | 1977 | Church of England | |
