= Disused railway stations on the Riviera Line =

Disused stations on the same line in South-West England

The railway branch line from Newton Abbot to Kingswear in Devon, England, is unusual as a large proportion of the stations are still open for traffic. Of the eleven stations, five are still open so there are six disused railway stations on this line, a lower proportion than most similar lines that do not serve big cities.

The South Devon Railway opened a branch line to Torquay (later "Torre") on 18 December 1848. This line was extended to Paignton by the Dartmouth and Torbay Railway on 2 August 1859, finally reaching Kingswear on 16 August 1864. The section from Newton Abbot to Paignton is now part of Network Rail's Riviera Line, while the section from Paignton to Kingswear is now the Dartmouth Steam Railway.

== Stations ==
=== Kingskerswell ===
Located at 50.49839°N 3.58412°W

As early as 1849, the residents of Kingskerswell were petitioning the South Devon Railway Company to stop trains at their village; they would even be prepared to pay for the station themselves. It was not until 1 July 1853 that a station was eventually provided.

The branch had only a single track, but a passing place was provided at Kingskerswell in 1861 to allow more traffic to be handled. On 19 November 1864 a goods train passed through the station without stopping and collided with a passenger train approaching from Torre, but luckily there were no serious injuries. Another accident occurred on 22 January 1874 when a passenger train going towards Newton Abbot was derailed in the station.

A second track was laid to Newton Abbot and brought into use on 22 May 1876 along with a second platform at Kingskerswell; the double line was extended to Torquay on 26 March 1882.

The station is situated in a cutting beneath a viaduct carrying a road across the line. The station building was at road level on the west side, with the booking office at first floor level; access to the other platform was by steps from the viaduct. A signal box was situated at the south end of the northbound platform, with a goods siding beyond. The platforms were extended to 600 feet (180 m) in 1911 to allow longer trains to call.

The station closed on 5 October 1964 but the platforms are still clearly visible from passing trains.

=== Preston Platform ===
The Great Western Railway opened a platform to serve the popular Preston Sands beach in Paignton on 24 July 1911. It was mainly served by the steam rail motors that had been introduced earlier that year to compete with the trams then running between Paignton and Torquay. It was closed, however, on 21 September 1914.

=== Goodrington Sands ===
A station at Goodrington opened in 1928, and was retained when the line went into preservation in 1972. Following the COVID-19 pandemic in 2020, services at the station were withdrawn and not reinstated.

=== Churston ===
A station at Churston opened in 1861, and was retained when the line went into preservation in 1972. Following the COVID-19 pandemic in 2020, services at the station were withdrawn and not reinstated.

=== Broadsands Halt ===
A small halt was authorised at Broadsands, alongside the single track between the Broadsands and Hookhills viaducts, at the same time as Goodrington Halt, however there is no evidence of any money ever being spent on its construction. Some published works suggest that it was however constructed and used for excursion traffic between 9 July 1928 and 23 September 1929. There is no photographic or physical evidence of it being constructed.

=== Britannia Halt ===
On 18 October 1877 Albert Edward, Prince of Wales took two of his sons, Prince Albert Victor and Prince George Frederick, to join HMS Britannia, the naval training ship Dartmouth, as naval cadets. A special platform had been built by the Great Western Railway for the royal train next to the level crossing that carried the road down to the Dartmouth "floating bridge" ferry on the River Dart near Kingswear railway station. The platform was decked with flags and covered in maroon carpet; an avenue of evergreens lined the route along which the royal party walked to the boat that took them out to the ship.

The platform was retained as "Kingswear Crossing Halt" but later became known as "Britannia Halt"; it was generally only available for the use of visitors to HMS Britannia. It was removed in 1988 as it was considered unsafe.

== See also ==
- Disused railway stations (Exeter to Plymouth Line)
