= Saltern Cove =

Site of Special Scientific Interest in Devon, England

Coordinates: 50.416°N 3.556°W

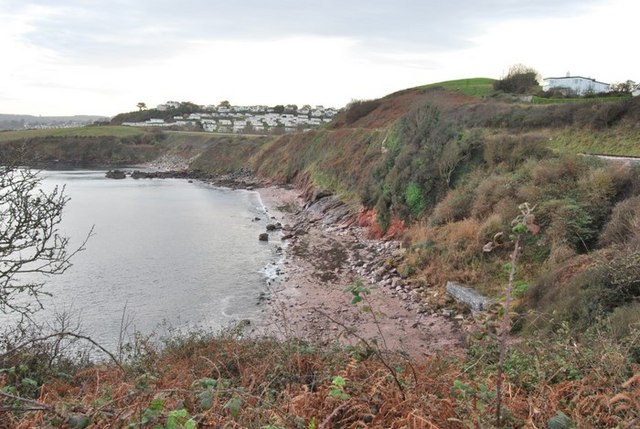
Saltern Cove is a Site of Special Scientific Interest.

Saltern Cove is a Site of Special Scientific Interest. It is on the coast of Tor Bay, south of Paignton, Devon, England. It is one of the coves which make up the local area known as "Three Beaches".

== Flora and fauna ==
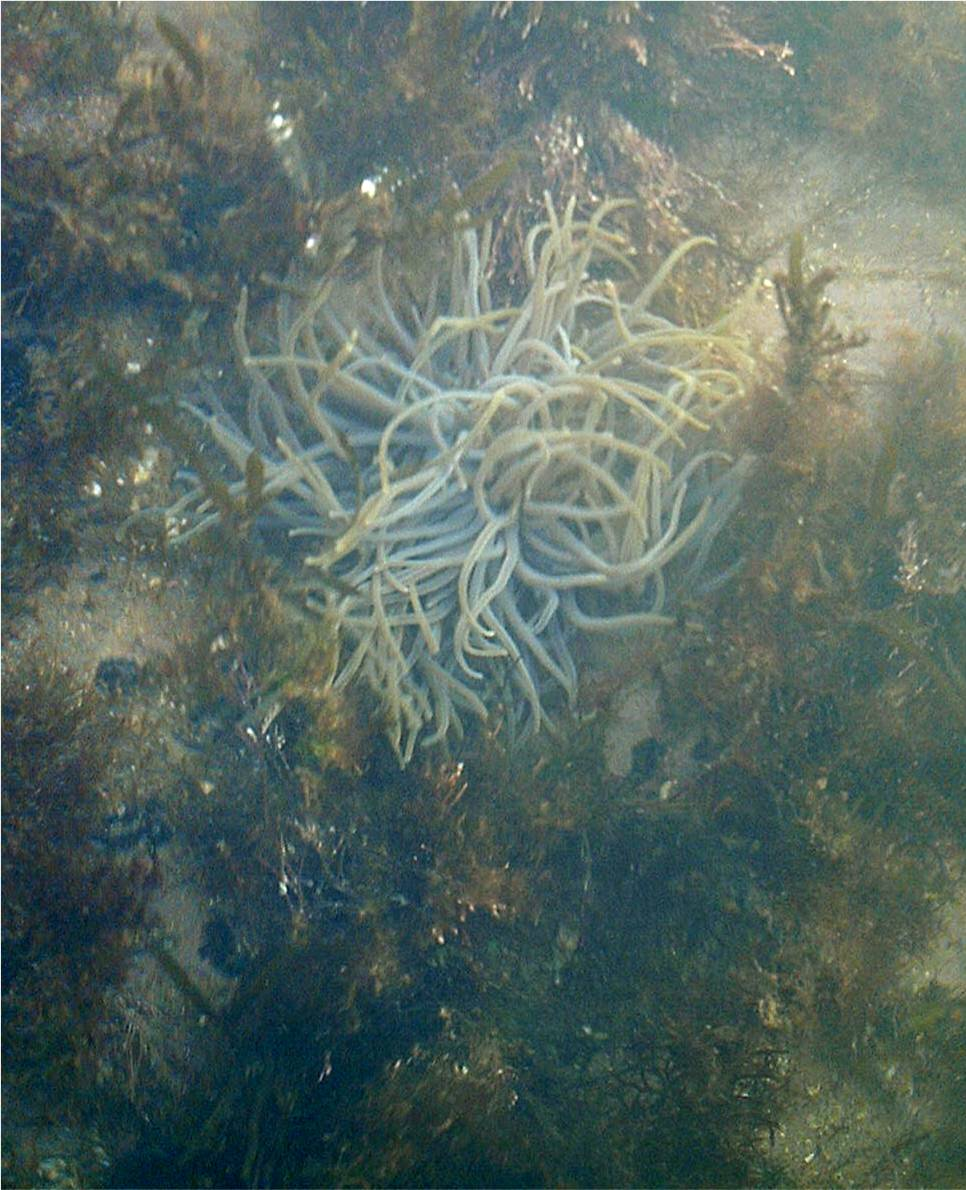
Snakelocks anemone (Anemonia sulcata) in a rock pool.

The rocky coastline at Saltern Cove supports diverse communities of intertidal plants and animals. Along the lower shore the coarse grained rocks are partly covered by brown seaweeds such as Flat wrack (Fucus spiralis) and Knotted wrack Ascophyllum nodosum, while pools and crevices in the rocks provide shelter for a wide variety of algal species, such as the red seaweed Corallina officinalis. Animals include the Snakelocks anemone Anemonia viridis, the Spotted goby Gobius ruthensparri, Periwinkles Littorina spp. and the Squat lobster Galathea strigosa.

At low tide, sandy areas are exposed between the rocks and these support a fauna characteristic of sediment shores including Common starfish Asterias rubens and burrowing animals such as the Razor shell Ensis arcuata, the Thin tellin Tellina fabula and the Sea potato Echinocardium cordatum.

== Geology ==
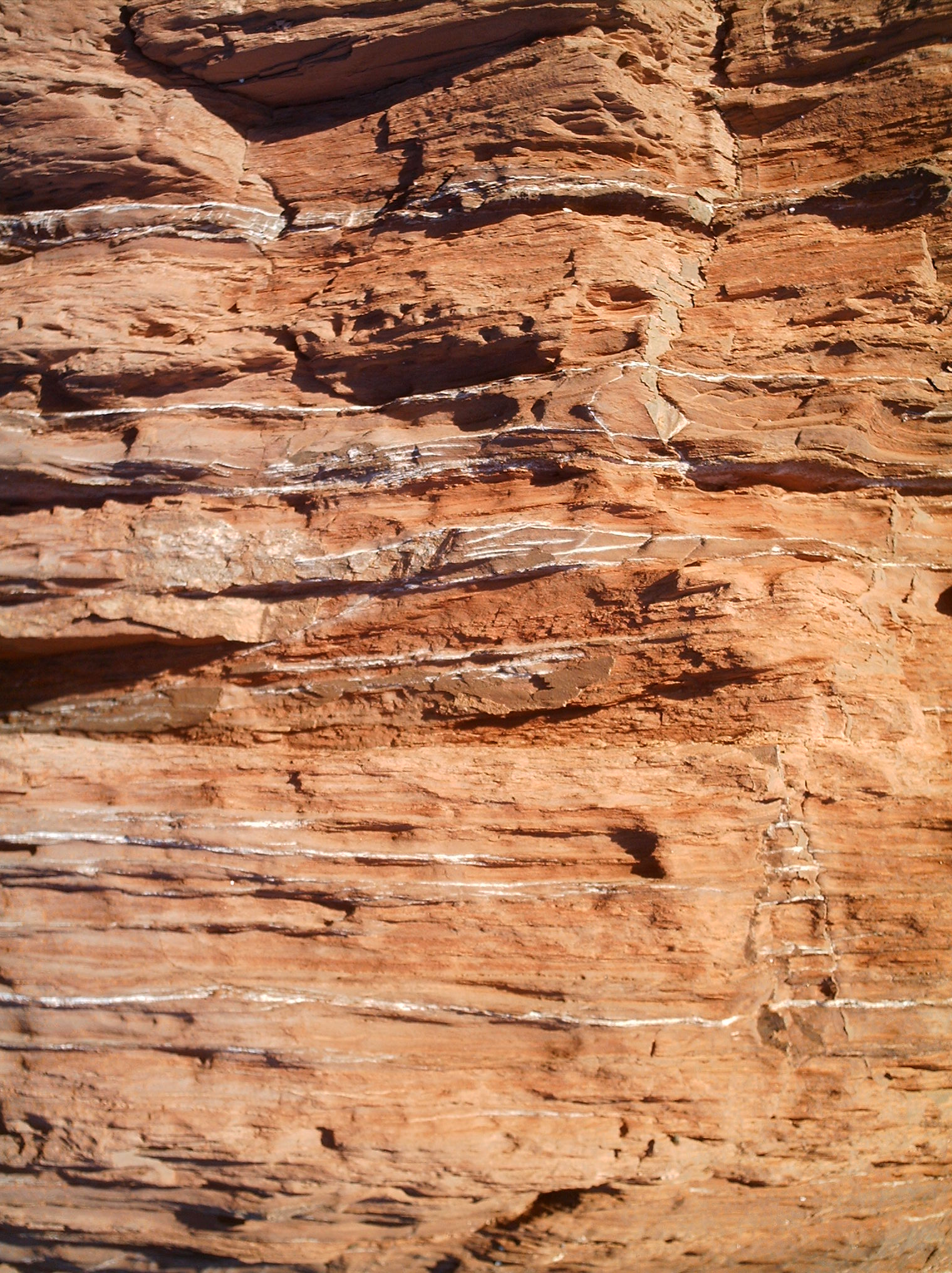
Layers of shale at the north end of the cove.

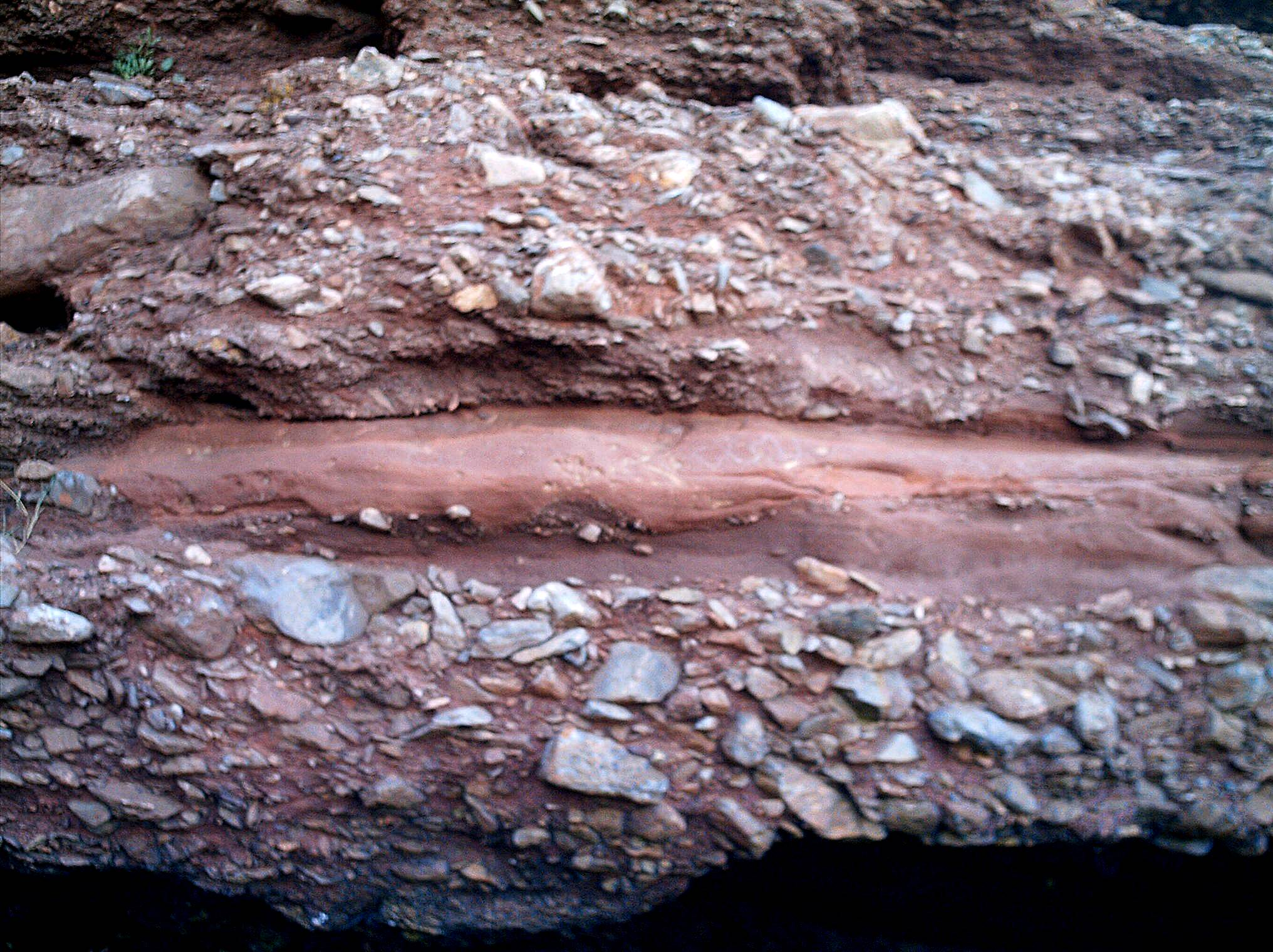
Red shale sandwiched between layers of conglomerate sandstone.

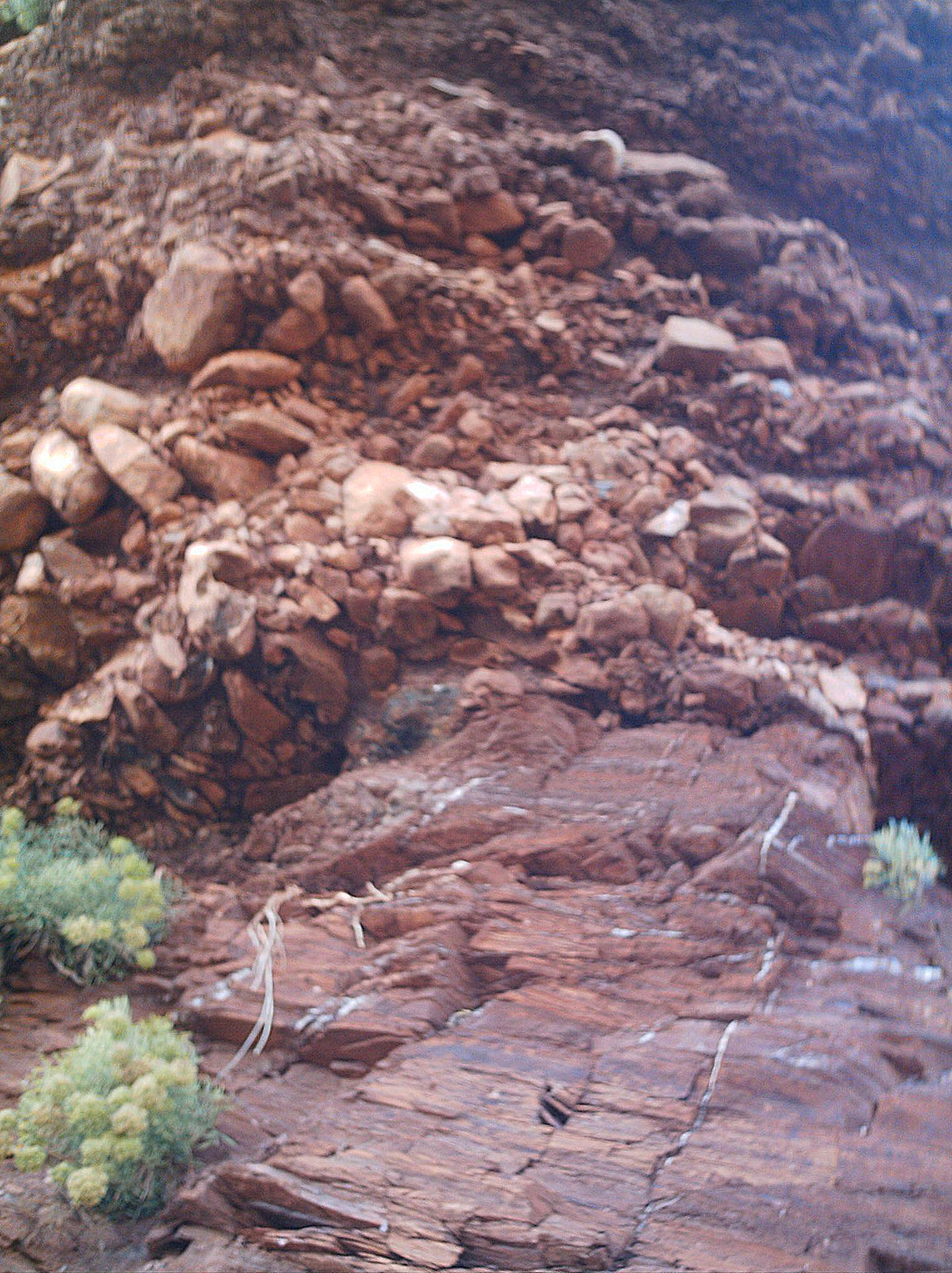
The bare cliff face reveals different rock layers.

The cliff face is an exposed face of a greatly disturbed Devonian sequence, overlain in places by Permian sandstones and breccias. The succession is composed of Givetian limestones, which are separated by a thrust from a Frasnian – Famennian sequence of slates and limestones on top of dolerite and tuffs. These beds are adjacent to interbedded thin bands of shales, fine greenish tuffs, red crinoidal limestones, contorted coarse tuffs and red shales and shale limestone. Inshore, an intrusive albite dolerite sill rests on the tuffs.

The next layer up comprises limestones in which fossils of the corals Macgeea, Thamnopora, and Alveolites have been found. A seven-meter layer of crinoidal limestone contains the fossil coral Peneckiella salternensis.

At the back of the beach, these rock forms are found again, but here including tuff lenses and pale green reduction bands.

On the northeast side of the point are the Saltern Cove Goniatite Band outcrops of the Upper Frasnian age. Limestone clasts above and below this level however, have revealed conodonts of the quadrantinodosa Zone of the Famennian (Upper Cheiloceras – lower Platyclymenia Zone) indicating that the Goniatite Bed is an intraformational slump.

Eight metres above the Goniatite Band is a metre-thick limestone conglomerate. This displays grading, contains blocks up to 50 cm across, as well as small micritic limestone clasts, which contain Frasnian and Famennian conodonts.

== Conservation problems ==
As Saltern Cove lies between the major tourist beaches at Goodrington and Broadsands, there is continual disruption to the site due to rockpooling and collecting. It is believed that the diversity of the site's fauna has decreased over the last 25 years.

== Land ownership ==
All land within Saltern Cove SSSI is owned by the local authority.
