= St Michael's, Torbay =

St Michael's, Torbay may refer to:

- St Michael's Chapel, Torquay, a small medieval chapel
- St Michael's Church, Paignton, a former Church of England church
  - An area of Paignton near the former church
