= Broadsands Chambered Tomb =

Neolithic burial chamber in Devon, England

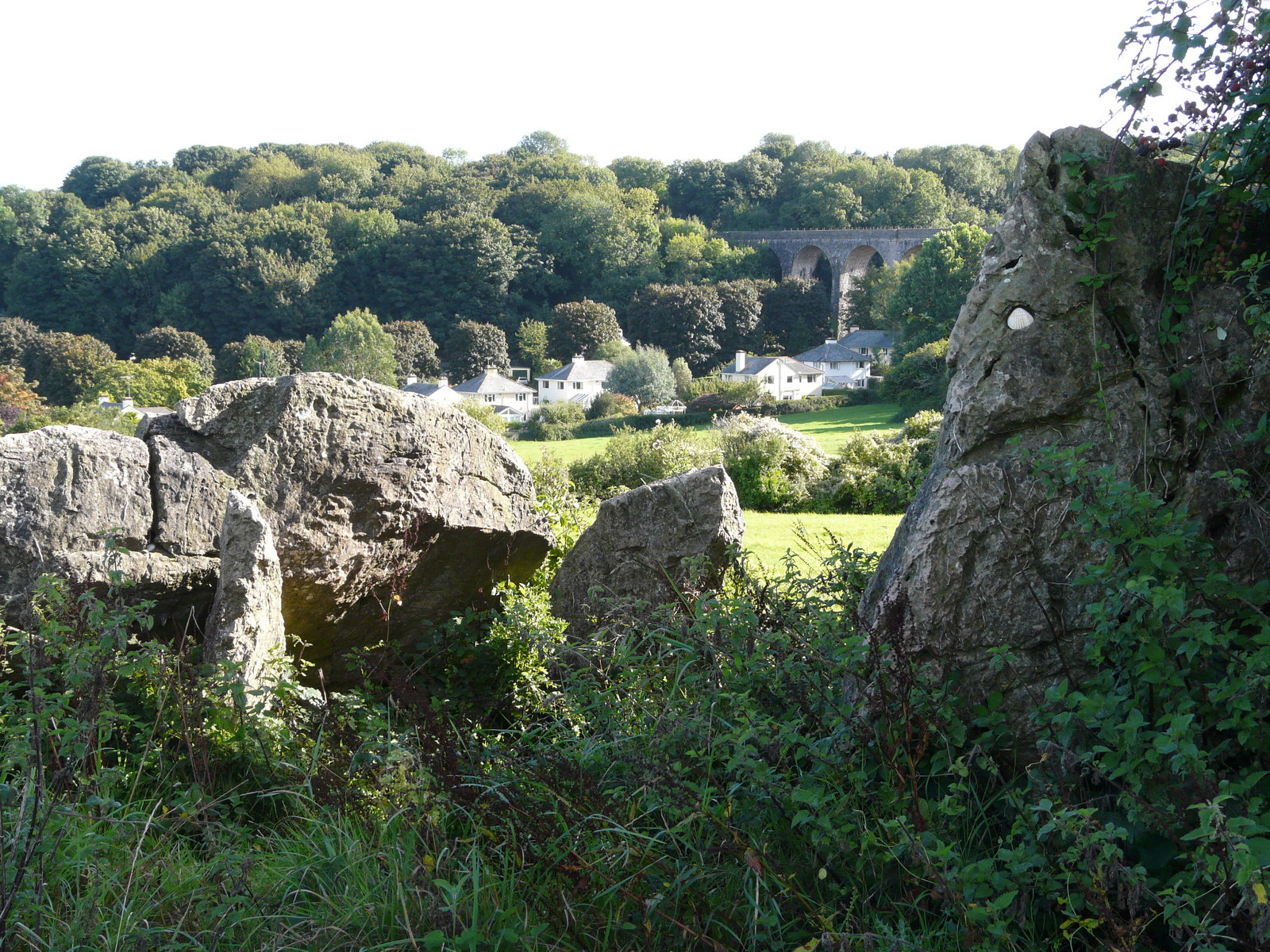

- Shown within Devon
- 50.405280°N 3.559266°W
- Location: Broadsands
- Region: Devon
- OS grid reference: SX 89319 57329

Site notes
- Excavation dates: 1958
- Archaeologists: Ralegh Radford

The Broadsands Chambered Tomb is a Neolithic burial chamber located on a slope overlooking Broadsands Beach in Torbay in Devon, England. It is listed as a Scheduled Monument by English Heritage and was first listed in 1957.

== Description ==
The tomb is currently a part of a hedge bank, situated on hilly farmland between Broadsands Beach and the tracks of the Dartmouth Steam Railway. The tomb comprises a megalithic chamber and has a single entrance passageway. It was originally set within a cairn, part of which survives to the present day. During excavations it was found to contain the fragmentary remains of two adults and a child along with pottery shards from the Neolithic era.
