= Goodrington Sands =

English beach

- Beach
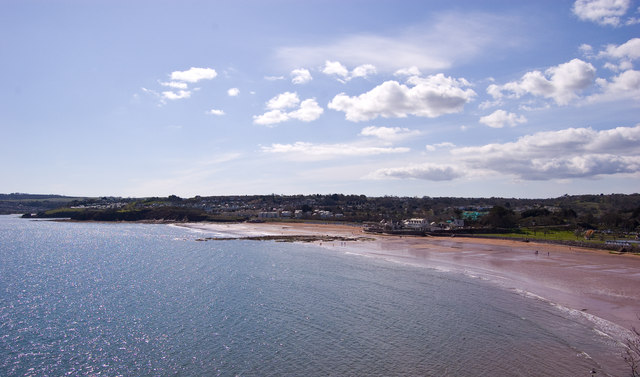
- View from Roundham Head

- Location within Devon
- Coordinates: 50.42490°N 3.55893°W
- Grid position: SX 89359 59499
- Location: Goodrington, Paignton, Devon, TQ4 6LN
- Part of: English Riviera
- Water bodies: Tor Bay, English Channel
- Geology: Sandy (red Devonian)
- Operator: Torbay Council

Area
  - Total: 13 acres (5.3 ha) (low tide); 3 acres (1.2 ha) (high tide)

Dimensions
  - Length: 820 m (2,690 ft)
  - Width: 170 m (560 ft)
  - Drop: 4.4 m (14 ft)
- Topo map: OS Explorer map: OL20: South Devon
- Awards: Blue Flag
- Parking spaces: 1,100 (3-4 mins walk) + 503 (8 mins walk)
- Website: enjoytorbay.co.uk/beaches/goodrington-sands/

Goodrington Sands is a sandy beach on the English Riviera, located at Goodrington, a coastal village on the outskirts of Paignton.

The beaches are gently shelving with a promenade at one end and rocks leading around to Oyster Cove at the other. The beach is split into two, South Sands & North Sands, by a minor headland, Middle Stone, that has a bar and restaurants overlooking the bay. North Sands (the promenade end) is very tidal and the sea comes up to the sea wall. South Sands has a much larger expanse of soft sand and the sea rarely reaches over ½ up the beach and then only on Spring tides and during storms.

This mainly sandy beach with clean, calm waters has earned the Blue Flag Award and lifeguards patrol in the summer months. It is therefore a major attraction in the area, capable of supporting a large number of visitors. Nearby are a Steam Railway Station, The Quaywest Water Park, The Seashore Centre, and Goodrington and Youngs Park, which is an area of established park land. During the summer season, the local steam train can be seen running along the back of south sands beach.

== Holiday park ==
- Beverley Holidays (1956–present) (3 parks of Beverley Park, Beverley Bay and Beverley View)

== Gallery ==
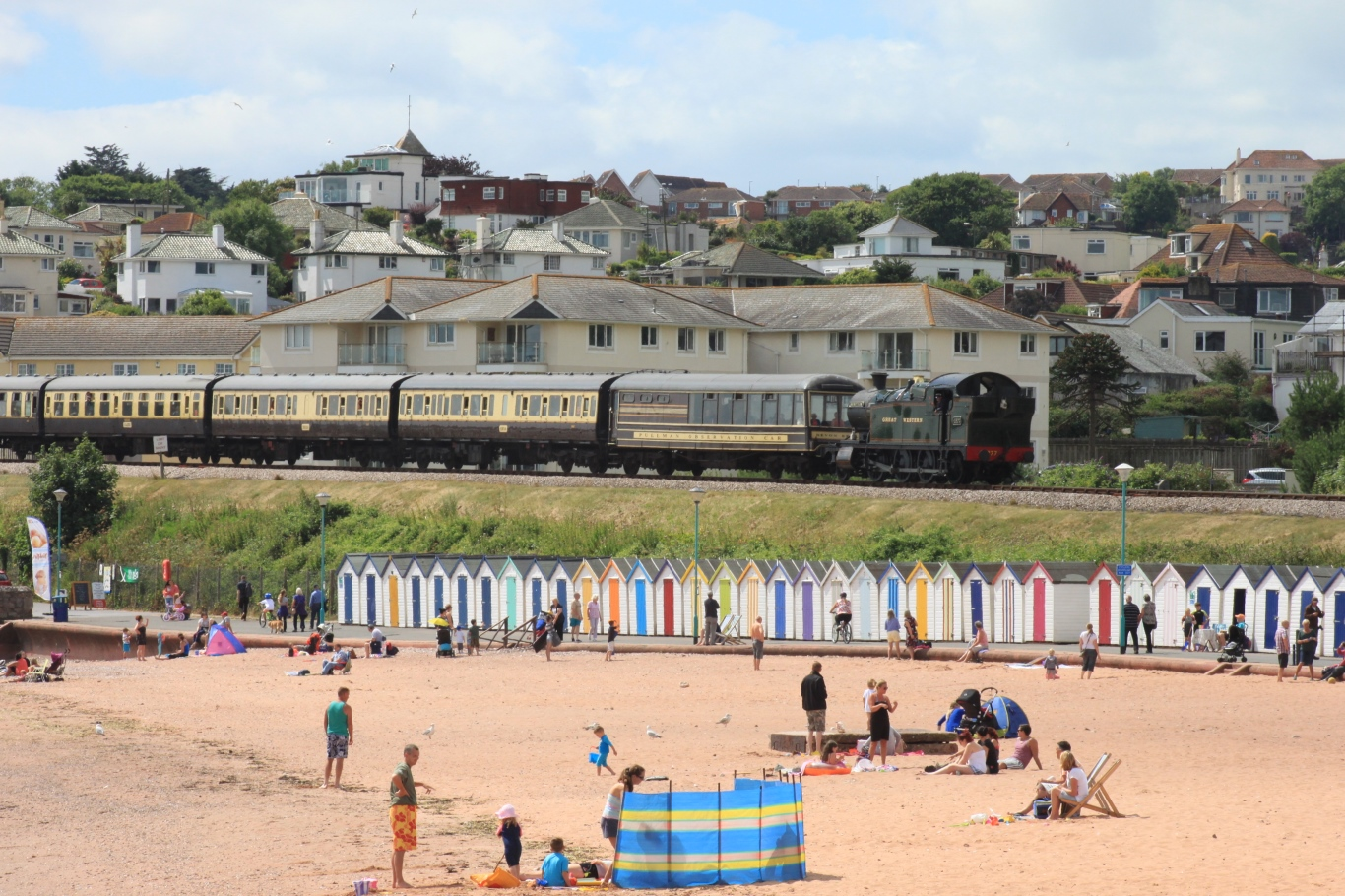
Goodrington Sands and the Dartmouth Steam Railway

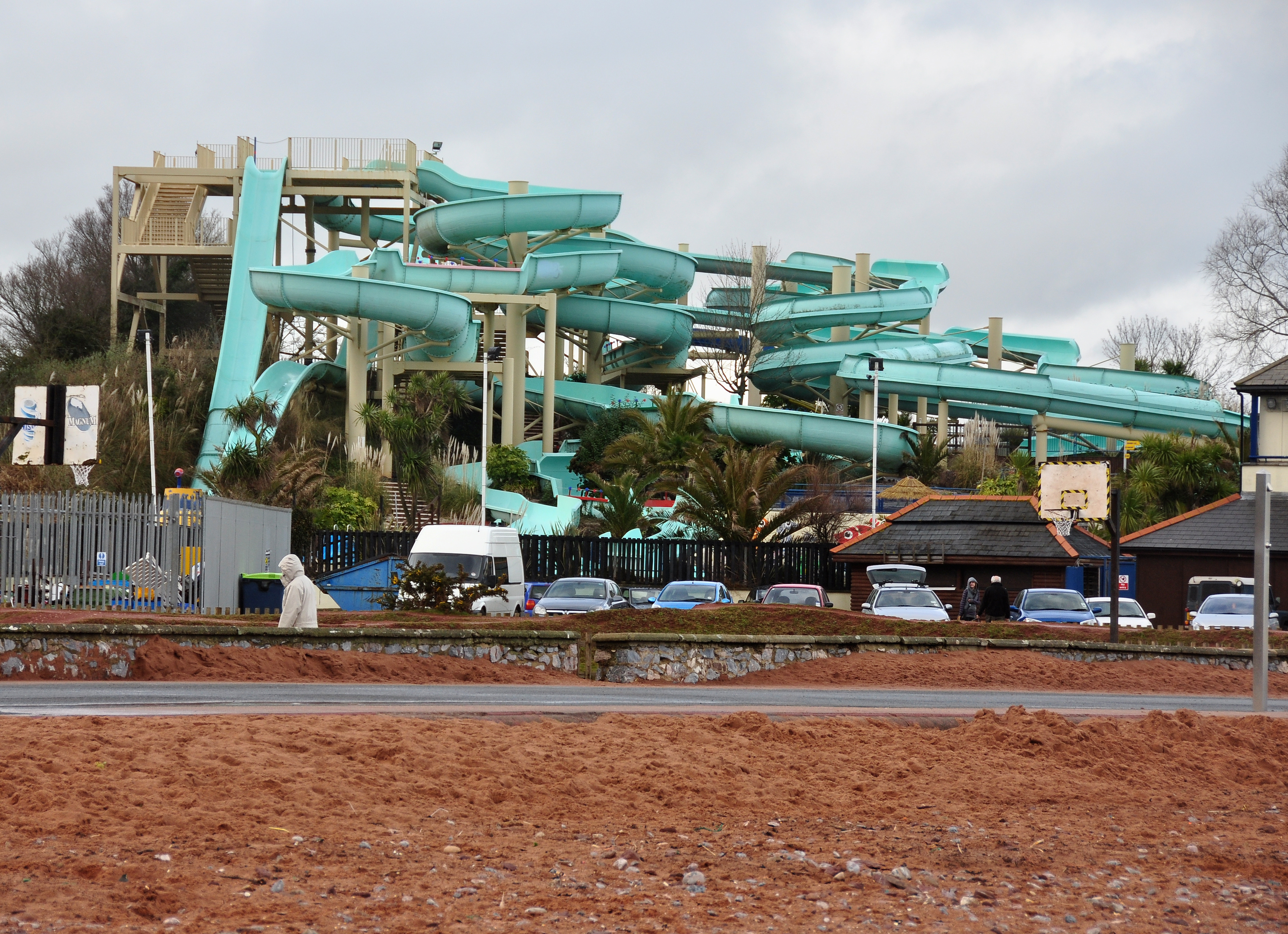
Quaywest Water Park, Goodrington

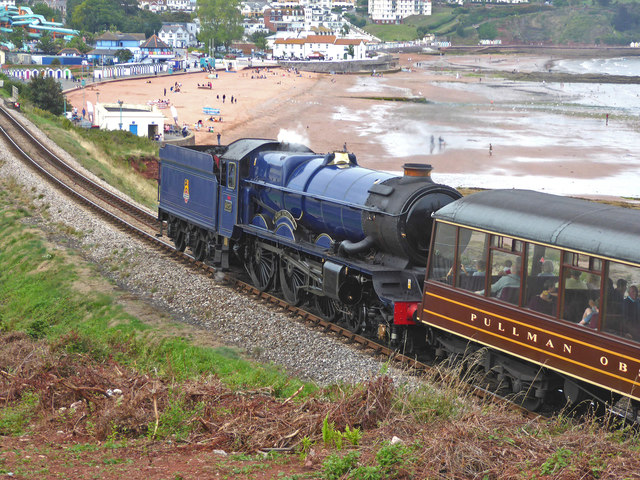
Steam train passes Goodrington Sands beach
