= Splashdown Quaywest =

Outdoor water park in Paignton

Coordinates: 50.4245°N 3.5609°W

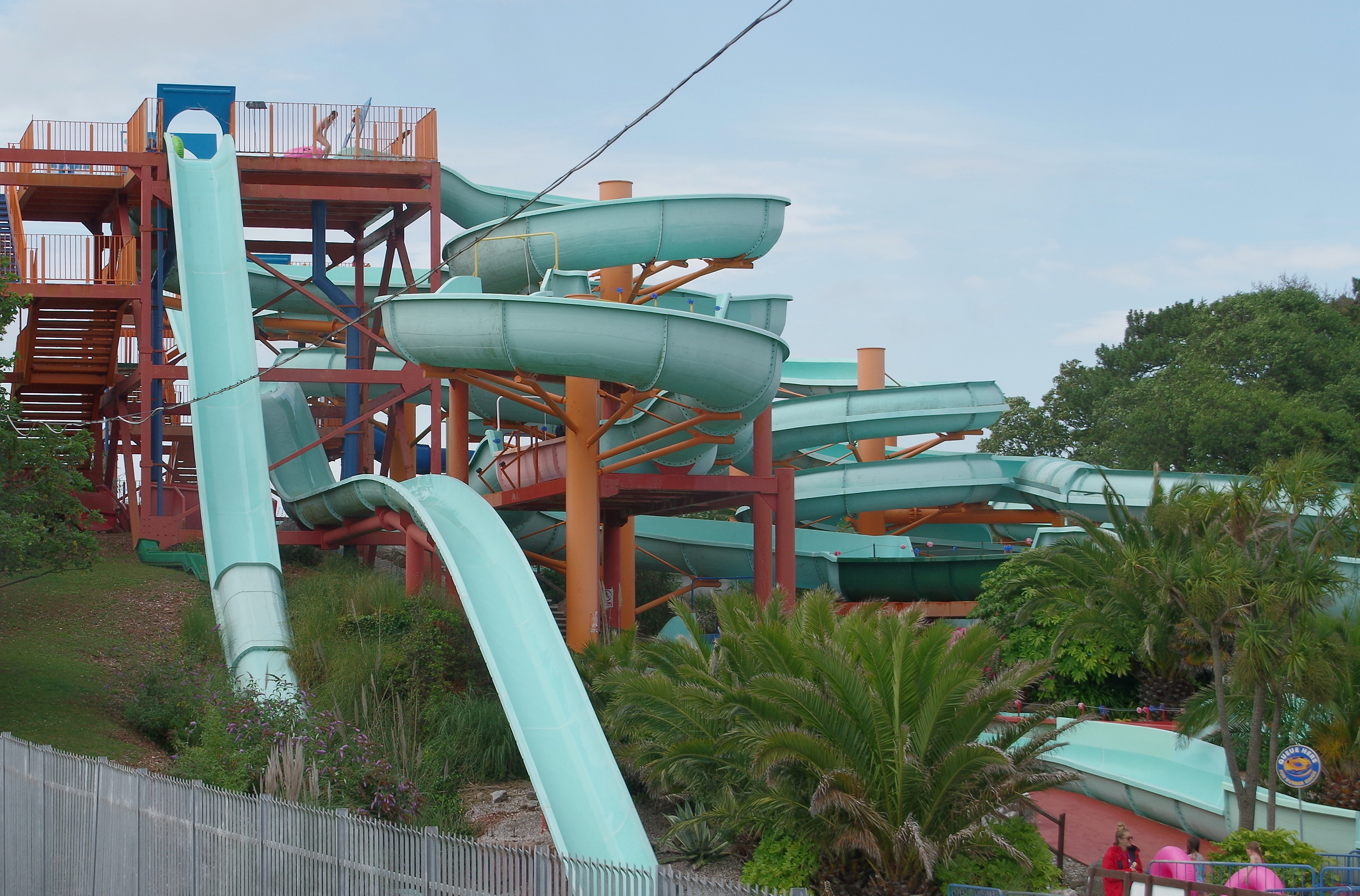
- Water slides at Splashdown Quaywest
- Location: Goodrington, Paignton, United Kingdom
- Owner: Alan Richmond
- General manager: Jon Lees
- Opened: 1988
- Operating season: May – September
- Water slides: 18 water slides
- Website: quaywest.splashdownwaterparks.co.uk

Splashdown Quaywest is the largest outdoor waterpark in the UK. It is located on Goodrington Sands Beach near to Paignton, Devon.

The original site has 8 water slides, small splash pools for youngsters and a swimming pool. In addition to the water park, the site also hosts a beach shop and a restaurant called 'Boarders waterpark cafe' and several food outlets selling fast food, ice creams and drinks, and now boasts 18 waterpark slides. 11 in the main waterpark and a further 7 in Captain Lewey's Shipwreck Island area.

== History ==
The water park first opened in 1988 as Quaywest and it was run for 15 years by Freetime Lesiure Management. Due to heavy financial losses Freetime Leisure Management handed the keys back to the council in September 2008. Torbay council awarded the contract to run the park to the Lemur Attractions Group, the company running the Splashdown water park in Poole, Dorset initially on a five and half year basis. The park was re-opened in June 2009 as Splashdown@Quaywest and is now known as simply Splashdown Quaywest. In 2021 the operators signed a long-term lease with Torbay Council, planning to spend £3 million to redevelop and expand the site. This development started in 2023 with a new 3 lane head first multi slide (the first in the UK) 3fall opening in June 2023, the first new slide since the Waterpark opened in 1988. May 2024 saw the opening of "Captain Lewey's Shipwreck Island" boasting a further 7 slides. They plan to open 2 more unnamed slides in the future as part of the expansion, as shown on the website.

== Gallery ==
Quaywest Water Park, Goodrington

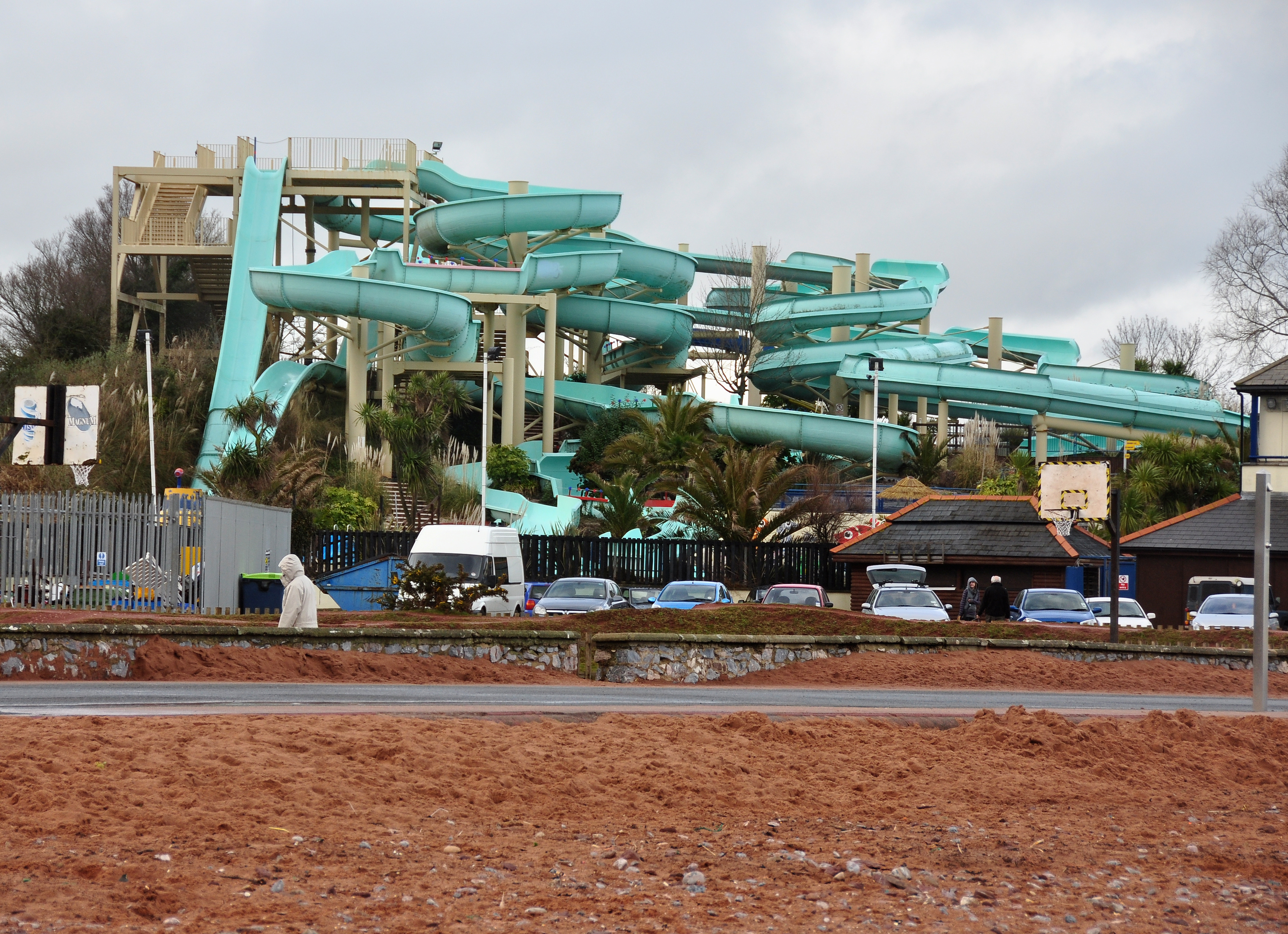
View from Goodrington Sands south beach

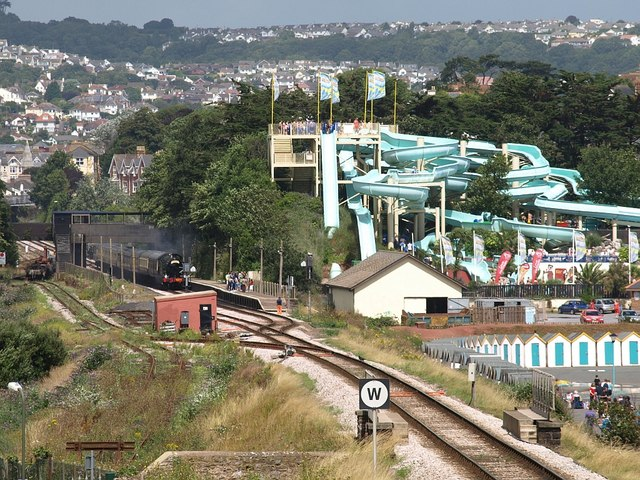
Close to Goodrington Sands railway station for the Dartmouth Steam Railway

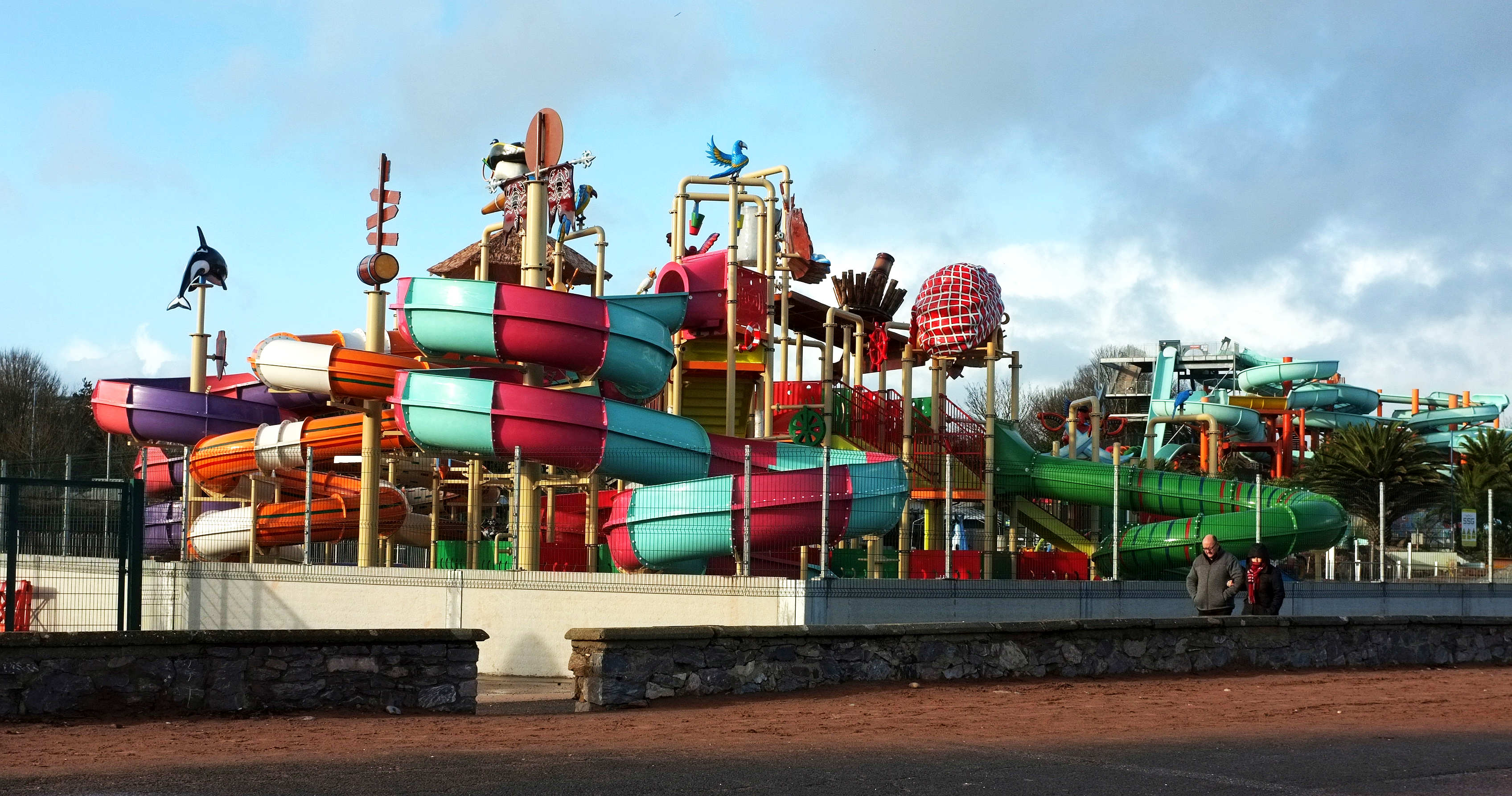
Captain Lewey's Shipwreck Island, a 2024 extension
