= St Michael's Church, Paignton =

Church in Devon, England

St Michael's Church
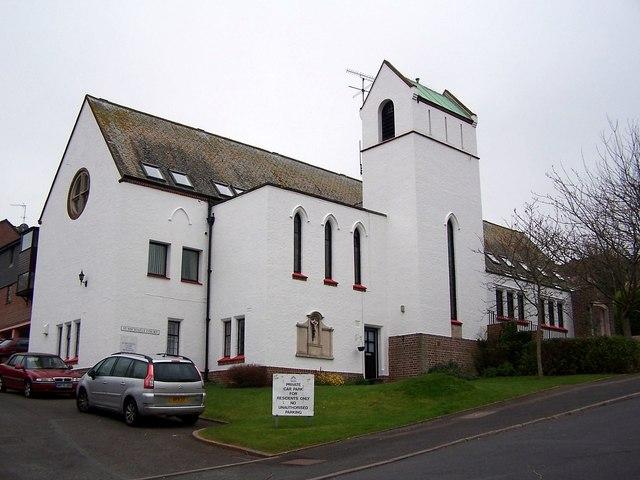

Religion
- Affiliation: Church of England
- Ecclesiastical or organizational status: Main Church closed, chapel still used
- Year consecrated: 1939

Location
- Location: Paignton, Devon, England
- Interactive map of St Michael's Church
- Coordinates: 50.4286°N 3.5739°W

Architecture
- Architects: Messrs. Tonar and Drury
- Type: Church

St Michael's Church, also known as St Michael's and All Angels, is a former Church of England church in Paignton, Devon, England. Built in 1939, the church closed in 1979 and is now part of a residential development named St Michael's Court, although the preserved chapel is still in use.

== History ==
St Michael's was built to replace a temporary mission church of 1909, which was located at Elmbank Road and had 200 sittings. Owing to the dilapidated condition of the building and the need for improved church accommodation in the parish, the vicar of Paignton, Rev. B. Montague Dale, launched an appeal in February 1937 to raise £10,000 for the construction of two new, permanent churches. Construction of the first church, St George's at Goodrington, began after £5,000 had been raised in six months.

A plot of land for the proposed new church of St Michael was donated by Mr. Herbert Whitley of Primley and plans for the building drawn up by the ecclesiastical architects Messrs. Tonar and Drury of Exeter. Once the majority of the second £5,000 had been raised towards Rev. Dale's appeal, construction of St Michael's began in early 1939, although the foundation stone was not laid by the Bishop of Crediton, Rev. William Surtees, until 23 June 1939. It was constructed by Messrs. Willcocks and Barnes of Paignton for a cost of £6,000. The church was consecrated by the Bishop of Exeter, the Right Rev. Charles Curzon, on 2 December 1939.

St Michael's was declared redundant on 1 April 1979. It was sold the following year to Devon Community Housing Society Ltd and planning permission was approved to extend and convert the building for the creation of 35 flats. The church now forms part of St Michael's Court, a development offering sheltered and retired housing.

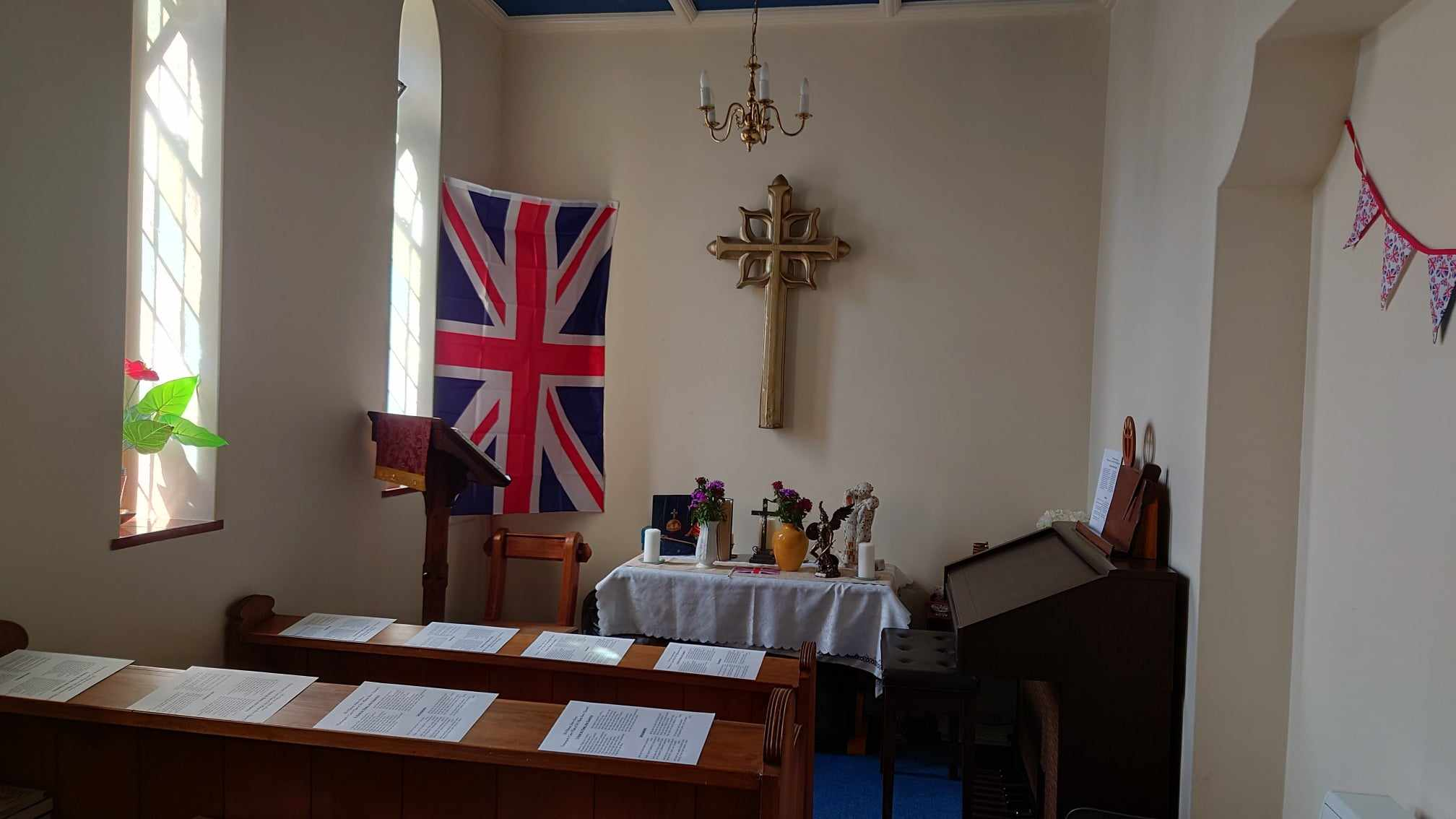
The preserved Lady Chapel of St. Michael's Church, still used for religious services

Starting in 2007, the preserved lady chapel of the original church, the only part of the church not to be converted into housing, began to again be used for religious services by an independent Christian church group from Exeter, naming it St. Michael's Fellowship. Services have been held monthly for residents, with only a small hiatus during the COVID-19 pandemic.
