= Goodrington =

Village in Devon, England

Coordinates: 50.421944°N 3.5625°W

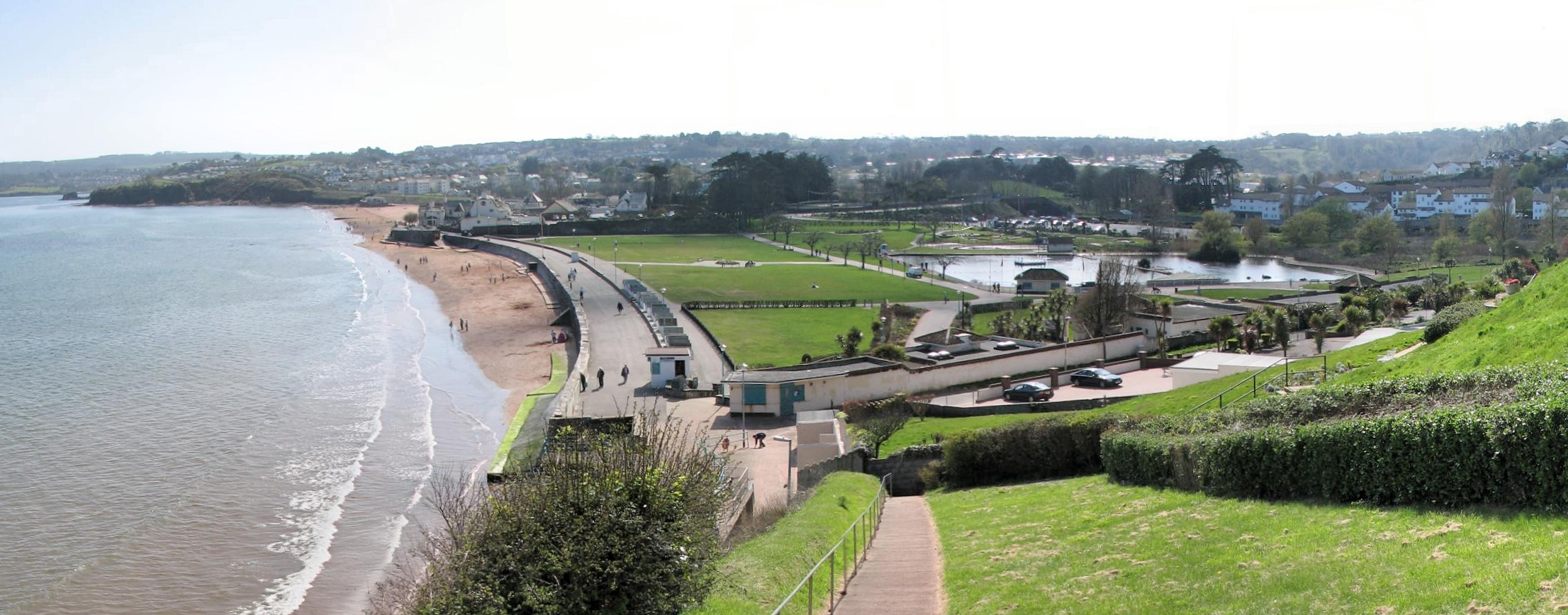
- Goodrington beach and part of the park

- Location within Devon
- Population: 6,910 (ward 2011)
- OS grid reference: SX8959
- Unitary authority: Torbay
- Ceremonial county: Devon
- Region: South West
- Country: England
- Sovereign state: United Kingdom
- Post town: PAIGNTON
- Postcode district: TQ4
- Dialling code: 01803
- Police: Devon and Cornwall
- Fire: Devon and Somerset
- Ambulance: South Western
- UK Parliament: Torbay

Goodrington is an area of Paignton in Devon, England. It is situated in Tor Bay and lies between Paignton town centre and Brixham, less than 1 mile (1.6 km) south of central Paignton. Its beach is known as Goodrington Sands.

== History ==
Goodrington is mentioned in the Domesday Book of AD 1086 as Godrintone in the ancient hundred of Kerswell. The village became part of Haytor Hundred when it was derived from Kerswell Hundred. In the 18th century the name was written as Goderington. In the late 19th century, the administrative functions of the hundred became a part of other units of government. In 1968 three councils were amalgamated, then since 1972 the Torbay Council provides many governmental services for Goodrington.

Goodrington used to have a railway station, on the Dartmouth Steam Railway, but this has been closed since 2020; it retains a water park, three beaches, a park with boating lake, various shops and other facilities, including a petrol station, public house and several holiday parks. To the south there is the South West Coast Path running past Saltern Cove to Broadsands. This passes several fishing spots and "Sugarloaf", a large hill with a view of the Bay. The area has two churches, St. George's (Anglican) and the Goodrington Methodist Church.

The main road passing Goodrington is Dartmouth Road (A379) which is served by Stagecoach Devon service 12 between Brixham and Newton Abbot every 10 minutes, as well as service 120 between Paignton and Kingswear. In addition Torbay Mini Buses operate service 25 between Paignton (Morrisons), and Roundham Road (close to Youngs Park) via the town centre on an hourly basis.

== Environment ==
The location is home to the largest known Davey Elm in the UK.
