= Ellacombe, Devon =

District of Torquay, England

Ellacombe
- District
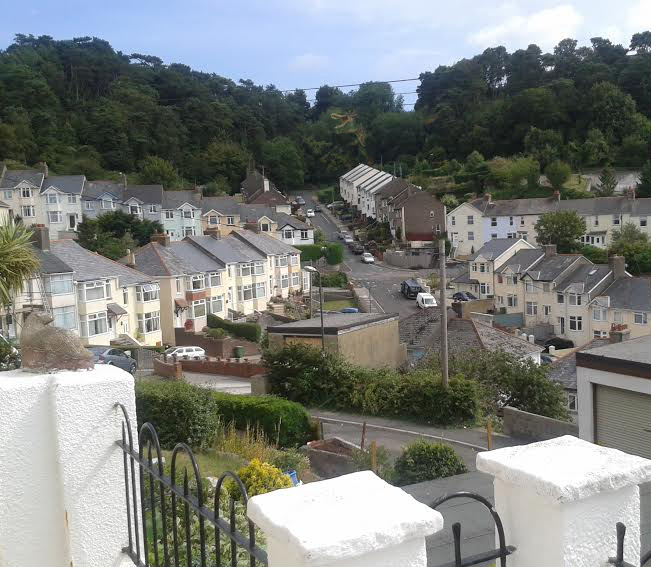
- Ellacombe in the summer

- Location within Devon Location within the United Kingdom
- Coordinates: 50°28′12″N 3°30′54″W
- Country: England
- County: Devon
- City: Torquay

Population (2011)
  - Total: 7,275
- Time zone: UTC+0:00 (GST)

Ellacombe is a district of Torquay, Devon. Ellacombe is home to Ellacombe Primary school, which is known to be the only place in Torquay that still has a fully standing World War II air raid shelter.

Torbay County Borough comprises the Towns of Torquay, Paignton and Brixham and surrounding suburban areas. The ward population taken at the 2011 census was 7,275.
