= St Paul's Church, Preston, Paignton =

Church in Devon, England

St Paul's Church
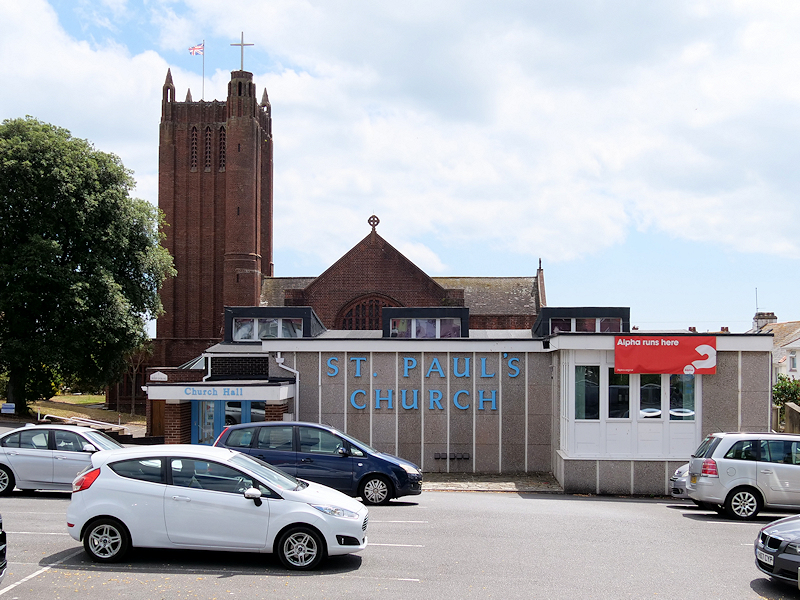

Religion
- Affiliation: Church of England
- Ecclesiastical or organisational status: Active
- Year consecrated: 1939

Location
- Location: Preston, Paignton, Devon, England
- Interactive map of St Paul's Church
- Coordinates: 50.4477°N 3.5562°W

Architecture
- Architect: Nugent Cachemaille-Day
- Type: Church

St Paul's Church is a Church of England Evangelical parish church in Preston, Paignton, Devon, England. It was designed by Nugent Cachemaille-Day and built in 1938–39.

== History ==
With the expansion of the hamlet of Preston into a suburb of Paignton during the late 19th-century and early 20th-century, a mission room was first established around 1904. A temporary church dedicated to St Paul was then erected in 1909 as a chapel of ease to Christ Church, with accommodation for 200 persons. As additional church accommodation was soon required, a second temporary church was erected adjacent to the other in 1912, with accommodation for 350 people.

By 1937, the parish of Christ Church had a population of over 8,000, which was forecast to increase in the following years. With support from the Christ Church Parochial Church Council and the Bishop of Exeter, Rev. A. Harrington, the vicar of Christ Church, launched an appeal to raise £10,000 for a new, permanent church to be built. £4,600 had already been raised over previous years towards such a building.

In October 1937, Nugent Cachemaille-Day was hired to design a church capable of accommodating up to 450 persons. Messrs. Wippell of Exeter were later hired as the builders and construction began on 31 October 1938. The original intention was to build the nave, chancel and lower part of the tower, omitting the upper part of the tower and a chapel until more funds were raised. By the time construction began, a sum of £8,214 had been achieved and a loan of £2,000 received.

The foundation stone was laid by Dame Violet Wills of Haytor, in the presence of the Bishop of Exeter, on 14 January 1939. In May 1939, the Parochial Church Council unanimously decided to complete the entire church under their contract with Messrs. Wippell. Funds continued to be raised and a revised plan for the tower was submitted by Cachemaille-Day in June 1939.

The completed church, which cost £12,500 to build, was consecrated by the Bishop of Exeter, the Right Rev. Charles Curzon, on 9 December 1939. St Paul's was later made its own parish in 1948. A church hall was built adjacent to St Paul's in 1969. In 2002, St Paul's and Christ Church were united as a joint benefice.
