= Christ Church, Paignton =

Church in Devon, England

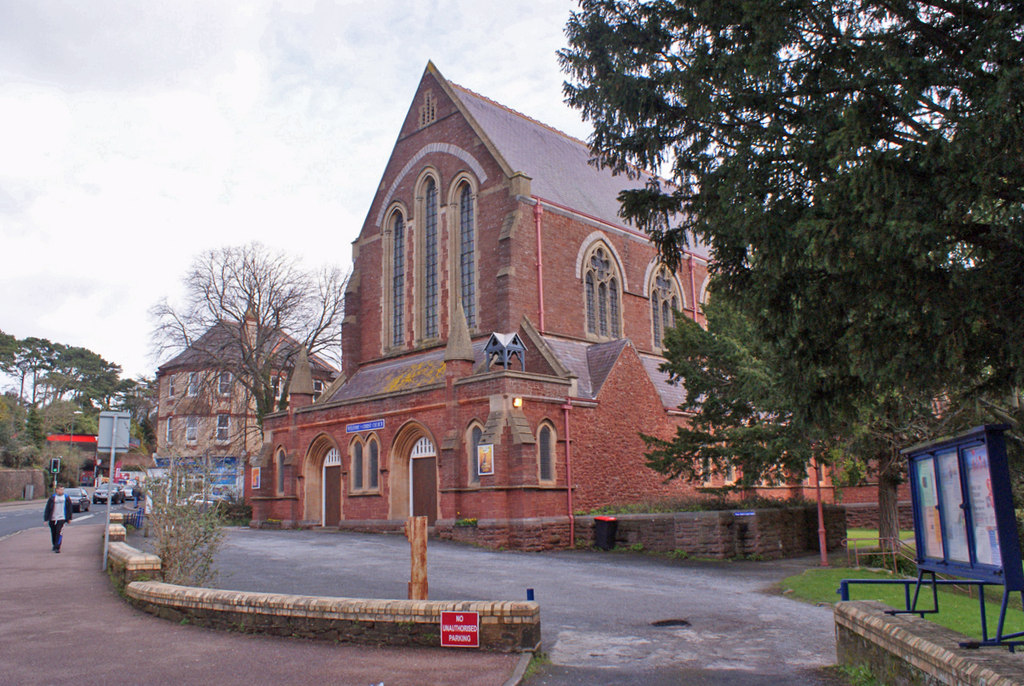
- Christ Church, Paignton
- 50.4403°N 3.5667°W
- OS grid reference: SX 88838 61228
- Location: Paignton, Devon, England
- Country: England
- Denomination: Church of England
- Churchmanship: Open evangelical
- Website: christchurchandstpaul.org.uk

History
- Consecrated: 1 June 1888

Architecture
- Functional status: Active
- Architect(s): Walter G. Couldrey, Edward Gabriel
- Architectural type: Church
- Style: Early English/Gothic Revival
- Completed: 1888

Specifications
- Capacity: 600

Administration
- Diocese: Exeter
- Archdeaconry: Totnes
- Deanery: Torbay
- Benefice: Paignton Christ Church and Preston St Paul
- Parish: Paignton Christ Church

Clergy
- Vicar: Rev. Nathan Kiyaga B.E.M.

Christ Church is a Church of England, Evangelical parish church in Paignton, Devon, England. Designed by Walter G. Couldrey and Edward Gabriel, the church was built in 1887–88 and has been a Grade II listed building since 1993.

== History ==
Christ Church was built at a time when Paignton was undergoing rapid growth and expansion. Efforts towards the construction of a new church had been made from around 1863, but these early efforts did not come to fruition and neither did a proposal to begin conducting services at Paignton's Temperance Hall. In April 1886, a public meeting was held at the hall to determine whether a separate ecclesiastical district should be formed in the northern region of Paignton parish and a new church erected to serve it. Mrs. Disney Robinson of Torquay had already promised £1,500 towards the endowment. The result of the meeting was to begin raising subscriptions and a building committee was established. The Ecclesiastical Commissioners agreed to match Mrs. Robinson's sum for the endowment and provide a plot of land large enough for the proposed church, along with a vicarage and school.

The new church was designed by Mr. Walter G. Couldrey of Paignton and Mr. Edward Gabriel of London as joint architects. Messrs. Christopher and Robert Elliott Drew of Paignton were the builders, with Messrs. Delafield and Pollard of Paignton handling the freestone work and Mr. W. Leaman as clerk of the works. Prior to its construction, an iron church was erected on the site in August 1886 to provide temporary church accommodation.

The foundation stone of Christ Church was laid by the Bishop of Exeter, the Right Rev. Edward Bickersteth, on 26 April 1887. It had been intended for Mrs. Disney Robinson to lay the stone, but heavy rain prevented her attendance. The church was completed a month ahead of schedule and was consecrated by the Bishop of Exeter on 1 June 1888. With its completion, the ecclesiastical parish of Christ Church was formed.

The original iron church was then used as a Sunday school. It was intended to replace it with permanent premises, but the scheme did not come to fruition. The vicarage attached to Christ Church was built in 1894. In 2002, Christ Church and St Paul's were united as a joint benefice. The original iron church remains in use as the church hall.

=== Present day ===
Christ Church did, for a short time, belong to the conservative evangelical tradition of the Church of England. On 6 April 2016, the parish passed a resolution to reject the leadership/ordination of women. As of August 2022, it is listed as an evangelical resolution parish by the Bishop of Maidstone, the bishop who provides alternative episcopal oversight for conservative evangelical parishes. The resolution to reject women's ministry was over turned at the Parochial Church Council meeting on the 11 July 2022.

== Architecture ==
Christ Church is built of local red sandstone, with freestone dressings, in the Early English style. Designed to accommodate 600 persons, it is made up of a nave with clerestory, chancel, narrow north and south aisles, north and south transepts, organ chamber and vestry. A tower and spire was intended for the church, but lack of funds meant this was never built. Original fittings include the pulpit of Caen stone with Devonshire marble pillars, and the lectern, made up of a brass eagle perched on a slab of rough Dartmoor granite and a polished slab base.

== Gallery ==
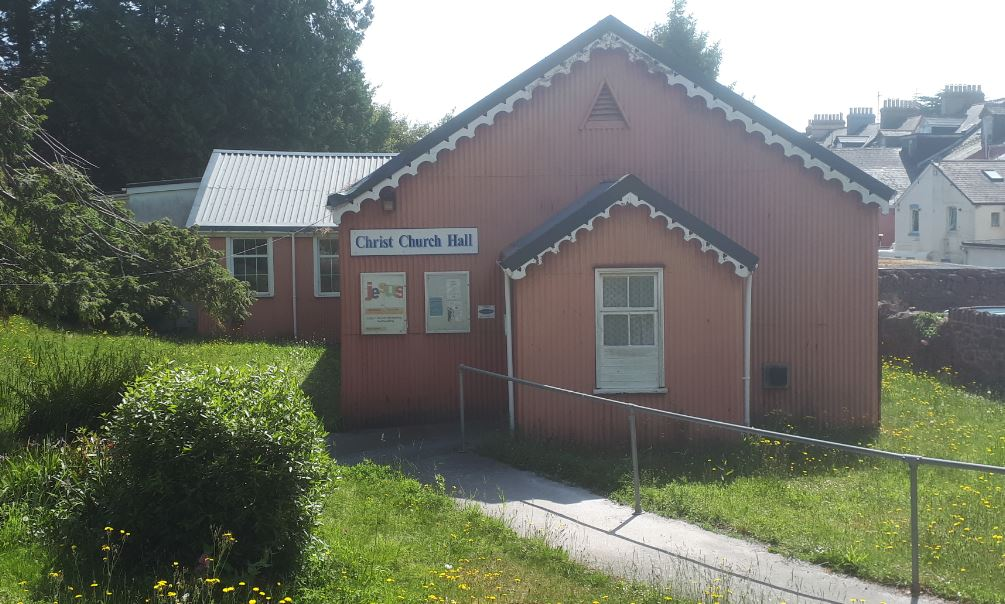
Christ Church church hall

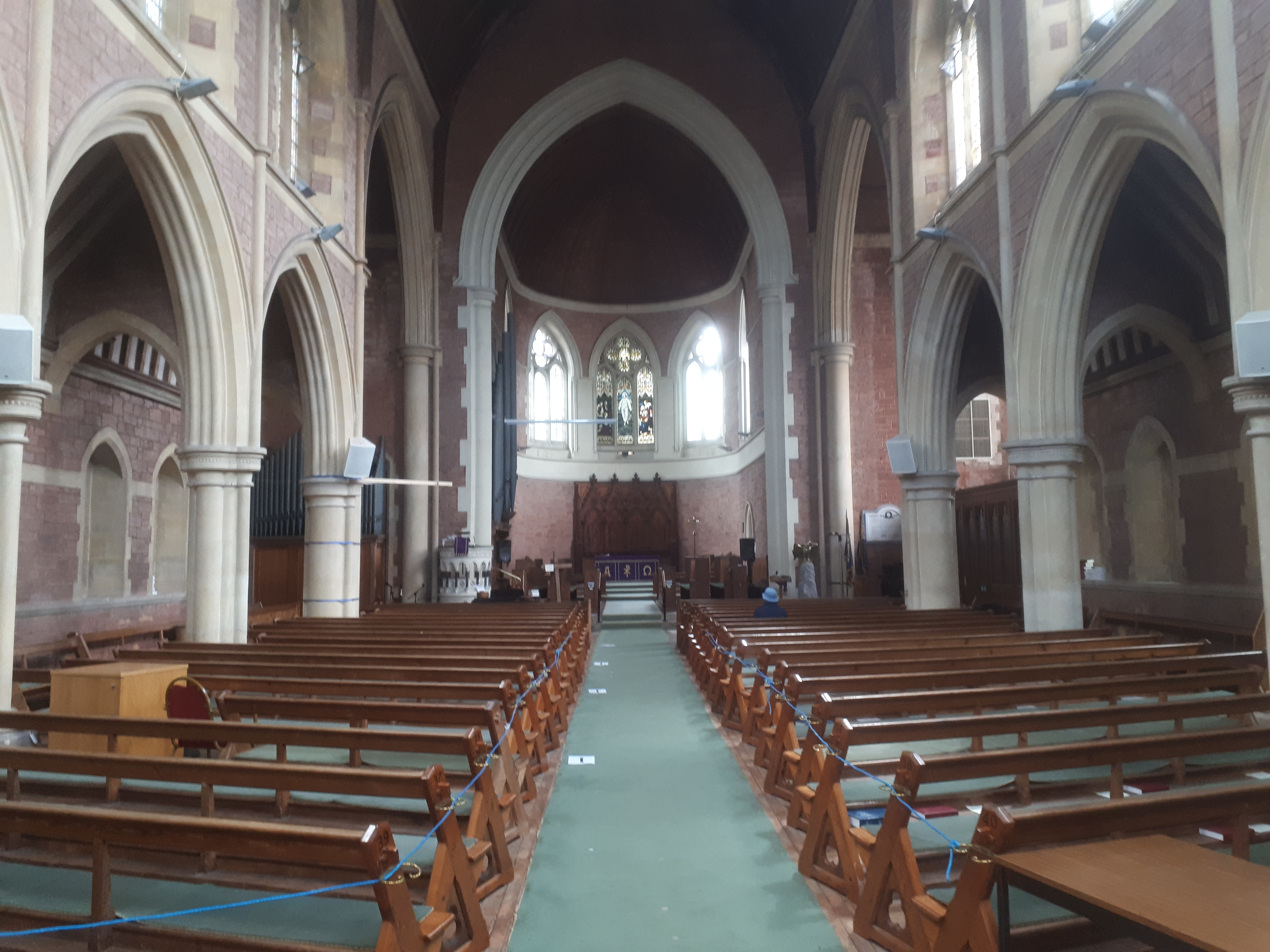
Interior June 2020

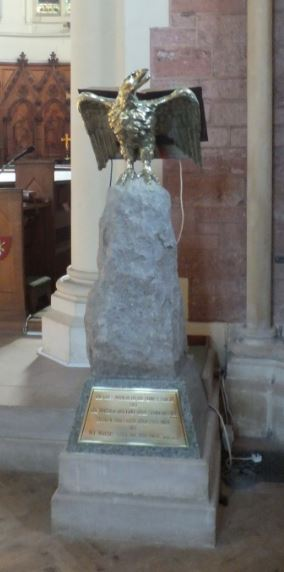
Eagle lectern on Dartmoor stone
