= Goodrington Sands railway station =

Heritage railway station in Devon, England

Goodrington Sands
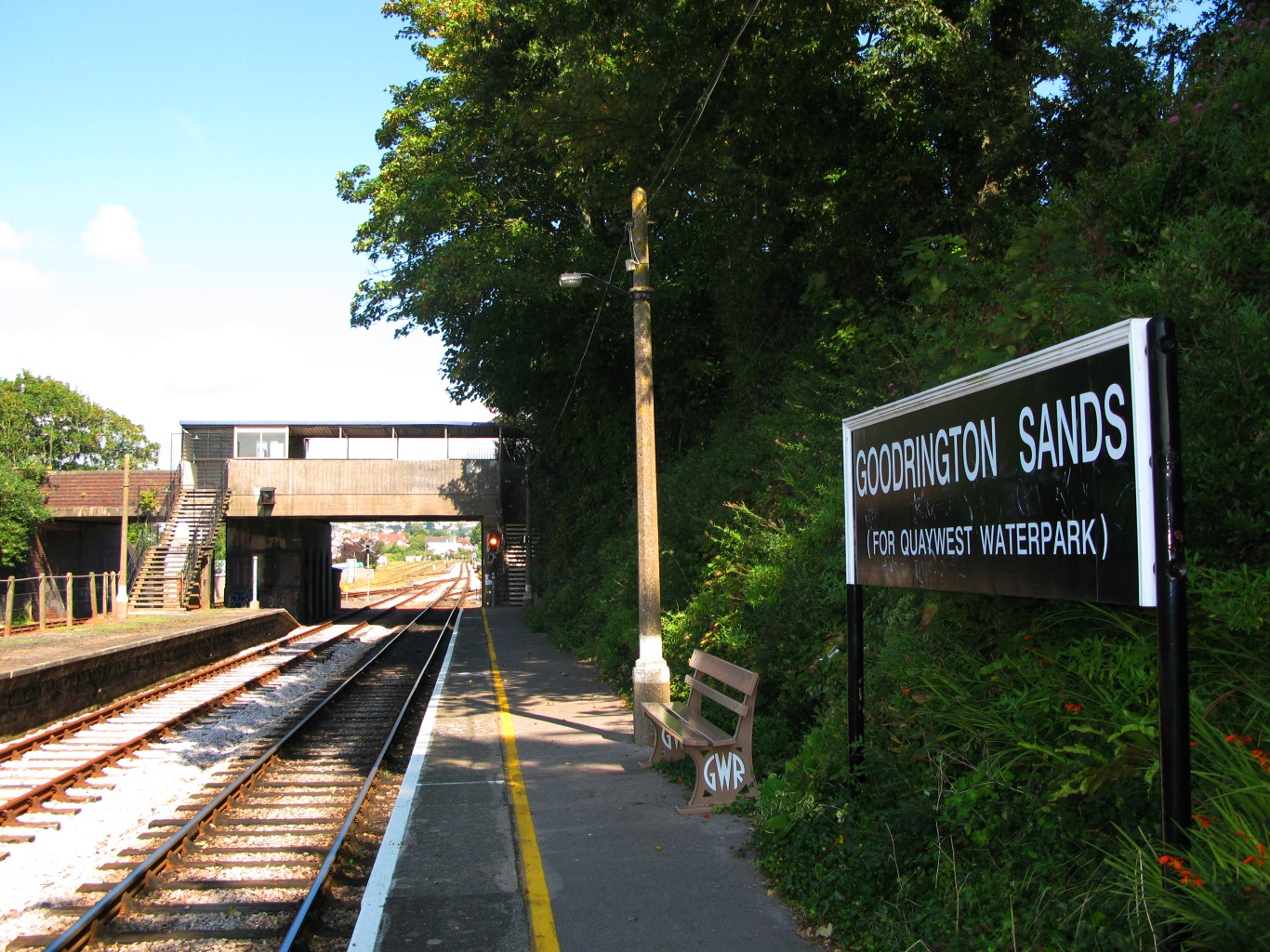

General information
- Location: Paignton, Torbay; England
- Coordinates: 50.4251°N 3.56216°W
- Grid reference: SX891595
- System: Station on heritage railway
- Operator: Paignton and Dartmouth Steam Railway
- Platforms: 2

History
- Original company: Great Western Railway

Key dates
- 1928: Opened
- 1972: Preserved
- 2006: Platform 2 through track re-instated
- 2020: Services suspended
Location

Goodrington Sands railway station is on the Dartmouth Steam Railway, a heritage railway in Devon, England. It is close to Goodrington Sands beach and the Splashdown Quaywest water park in Paignton. There has been no scheduled service at the station since 2020.

== History ==
When the Dartmouth and Torbay Railway opened on 14 March 1861, it passed over a level crossing on Tanners Lane, which led to the sea at Goodrington. Building the line across the marsh at Goodrington proved difficult but was achieved by laying redundant pipes from the failed atmospheric railway between Exeter and Newton in the ground for drainage.

It was not until 9 July 1928 that a small station, initially known simply as "Goodrington", was opened on the Kingswear side of the level crossing. A second platform was added as the double line, which had reached Tanners Lane in 1928, was extended into the station on 4 July 1930. The area between Paignton and Goodrington Sands was then redeveloped with carriage sidings and a new goods depot to allow the restricted site at Paignton to concentrate on the increasing holiday passenger traffic.

The local council opened a public park and boating lake between the station and the beach in 1936. Work started on a bridge to replace the level crossing in 1939, but this was not completed until 1956 due to World War II. At the same time a new footbridge with a ticket office was opened, from which steps lead down to the platforms. More carriage sidings were laid behind the platform and a 65-foot (20 m) turntable and locomotive facilities provided, mainly to handle the heavy traffic on summer Saturdays.

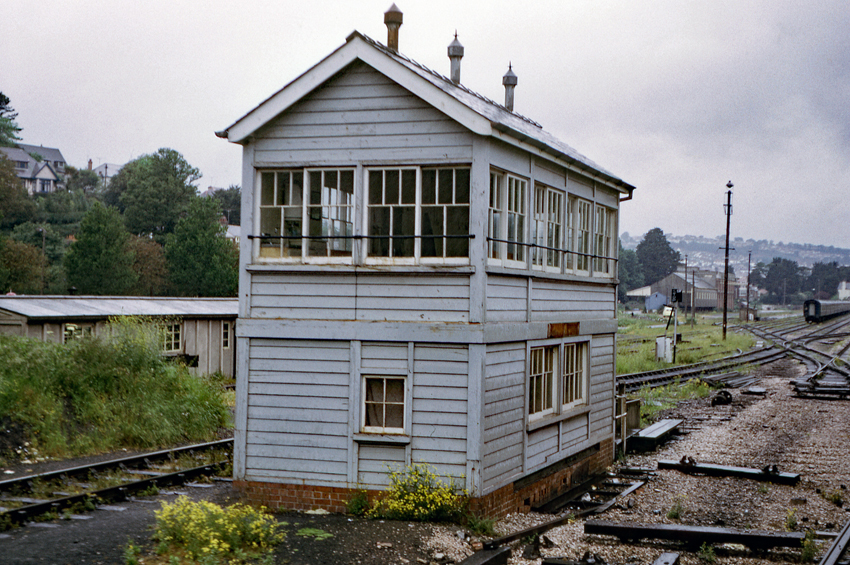
Goodrington Sands signal box shortly after closure

The signal box was closed on 1 November 1972, and the line was sold on 30 December 1972 to the Dart Valley Light Railway plc which operated another nearby heritage line at Buckfastleigh. Services were only run on the Down line (the one nearest the beach) as British Rail continued to use the Up line for access to the carriage sidings.

In 2006 the track through the second platform was reinstated and the carriage sidings behind the platform were connected to the Paignton and Dartmouth Steam Railway. The carriage sidings between Goodrington Sands and Paignton remain in use by Network Rail for main line trains, especially on summer Saturdays, and the section from here to Paignton is worked as two separate single lines with trains running in either direction on each track.

In August 2018, efforts have been made to renovate the station. The corrugated iron roof which formerly covered the 1956 booking office and entrance to platform 2 was replaced. The roof has been cut back to cover only the booking office, and is now of wood and felt construction. Work has also been carried out on platform 1 in order to widen the platform space. As well as this, new flower beds have been erected and extra benches have been provided for additional seating.

In January 2023, Kevin Foster, who was MP for Torbay at the time, called for the reopening of the station for trains to the national rail network.

== Description ==
Access to the station is from the footbridge alongside Tanners Lane, down the steps on the left of the ticket office. Standing on the platform looking towards the track, the 1957 carriage sidings can be seen behind the Up platform. To the left the line climbs up towards Churston railway station, while to the right, beyond Tanners Lane bridge, can be seen the Network Rail carriage sidings for Paignton, and on the sea side of the track, a siding used by the Paignton and Dartmouth Steam Railway to store engineers equipment.

A large car park is situated on the far side of the line by the main road from Paignton to Brixham. This is mainly intended for visitors to Quay West, the blue water chute of which is behind the Down platform on the site of the former station car park.

== Services ==
A seasonal service of steam hauled trains operates between Paignton and Kingswear but none are currently scheduled to call at Goodrington Sands.

| Preceding station | Heritage railways | Following station |
|---|---|---|
| Churston towards Kingswear | Dartmouth Steam Railway | Paignton Terminus |

This station offers access to the South West Coast Path
| Distance to path | 100 yards (91 m) |
| Next station anticlockwise | Paignton 1 mile (2 km) |
| Next station clockwise | Churston 3 miles (5 km) |
