= Kingswear railway station =

Heritage railway station in Devon, England

Kingswear
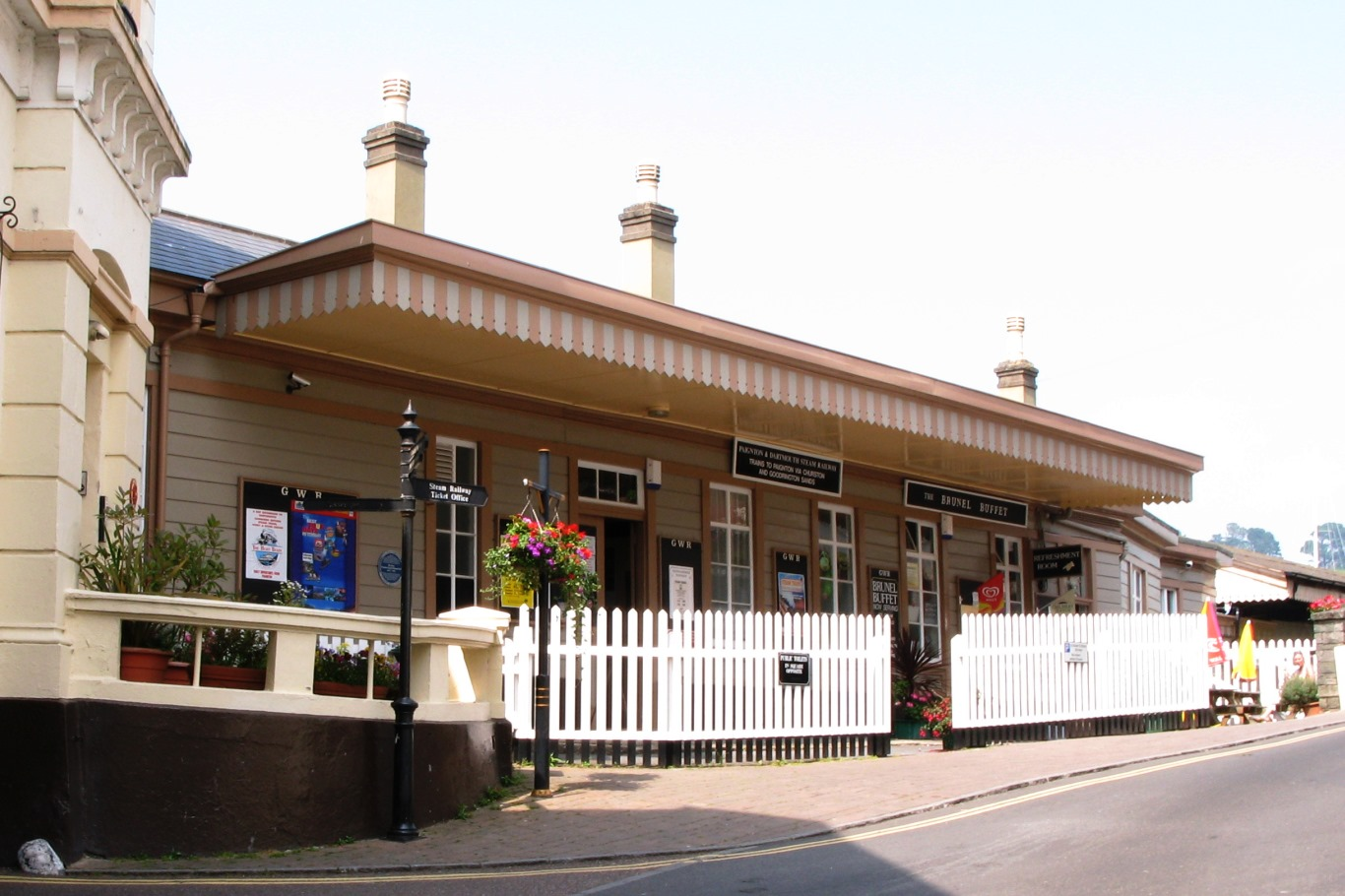

General information
- Location: Kingswear, South Hams; England
- Coordinates: 50.34882°N 3.57253°W
- Grid reference: SX881510
- System: Station on heritage railway
- Operator: Paignton and Dartmouth Steam Railway
- Manager: South Devon Railway
- Platforms: 2

History
- Opened: 1864
- Original company: Dartmouth and Torbay Railway
- Pre-grouping: Great Western Railway
- Post-grouping: Great Western Railway

Key dates
- 30 December 1972: Preserved
Location

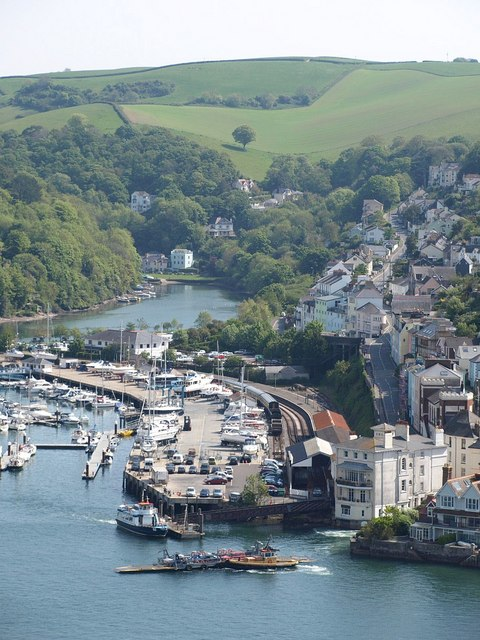
Kingswear railway station, seen from above Dartmouth. The Passenger Ferry is alongside its pontoon, whilst the Lower (vehicle) Ferry is just leaving for Dartmouth.

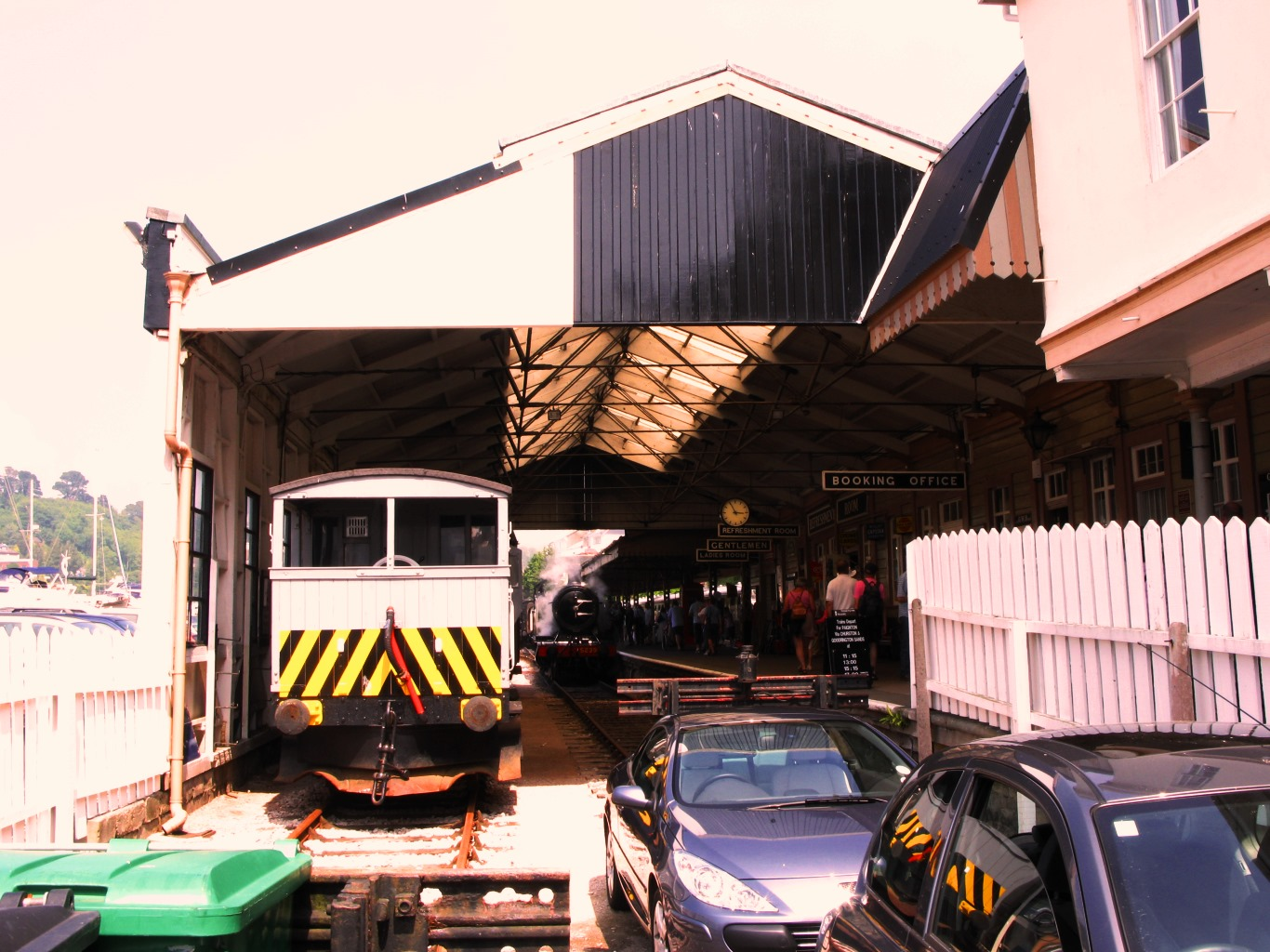
The train shed seen from beyond the end of the tracks

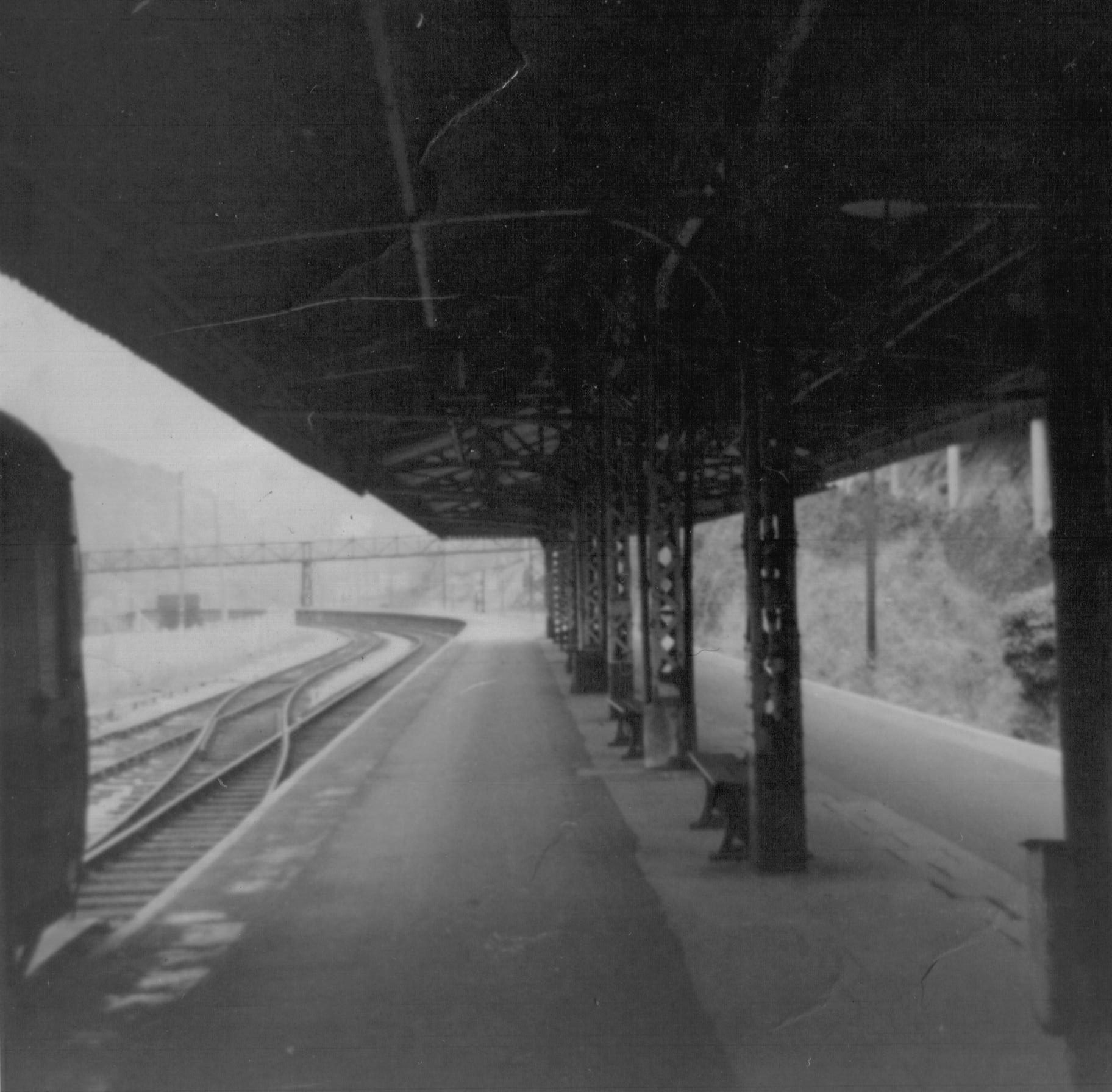
The platform and canopy in 1970.

Kingswear railway station is the terminus of the Dartmouth Steam Railway, a heritage railway in Devon, England. It is situated in the centre of Kingswear, on the shores of the River Dart opposite Dartmouth.

The station has level access to the street and is adjacent to Yacht Club Hotel, the pontoon for the Dartmouth Passenger Ferry, and the slipway of the Dartmouth Lower Ferry.

== History ==
The railway to Kingswear was built by the Dartmouth and Torbay Railway, opening on 16 August 1864. The original aim had been to reach Dartmouth but the railway station in that town, which sold train tickets and processed parcels but lacked platforms and trains, was only ever reached by ferry. The railway company opened the Yacht Club Hotel at the southern end of the station in 1866, intended mainly for passengers on the ocean-going ships that called at Dartmouth at that time.

Goods trains were run to Kingswear from 2 April 1866 and these proved to be of great importance, not just in shipping goods out by sea, but also in carrying coal landed at Kingswear to the gas works at Hollacombe between Paignton and Torquay railway stations.

The Dartmouth and Torbay Railway was always operated by the South Devon Railway Company and was amalgamated with it on 1 January 1872. This was only short lived as the South Devon Railway was in turn amalgamated into the Great Western Railway on 1 February 1876. The line had been built using the 7 ft (2,134 mm) broad gauge, but on 21 May 1892 was closed for the weekend to be converted to 4 ft 8 1/2 in (1,435 mm) standard gauge; the 28 men responsible for the work in the area were accommodated in the station's goods shed, which was situated on the river side of the main station train shed. New sidings were laid in 1894 and a signal box opened to control the trains; the following year more sidings were laid on land reclaimed from the river north of the station and a long footbridge constructed over the station to carry a footpath to the shore of the river.

The railway originally approached the station across three creeks on low timber viaducts. Those at Longwood and Noss being demolished after the line was moved inland around the creeks on 20 May 1923, and Hoodown Viaduct, just outside the station, was replaced by a double-track steel structure in 1928. This and the provision of a larger turntable enabled larger locomotives to work through to Kingswear. The platform was extended in 1929 to 850 feet (259 m) which allowed longer trains too.

The Great Western Railway was nationalised into British Railways in 1948. The signal box was given a new lever frame in 1960 but the run down of services soon commenced. The wharf was closed to freight traffic on 4 May 1964 and ordinary goods traffic was withdrawn on 14 June 1965.

Except for peak season trains, most services from 18 April 1966 operated as a shuttle service from Paignton; Sunday trains were withdrawn from 24 September 1967, although some were run during the summer of the following year. On 20 October 1968 the signal box was closed and the following month it was formally proposed that the line from Paignton should be closed entirely but instead, on 30 December 1972, the line was sold to the Dart Valley Light Railway plc, which operated a nearby heritage railway at Buckfastleigh. The Royal Dart Hotel was sold by the Dart Valley Railway into private hands in 1979, the revenue from this and other property sales going a long way to repay the £275,000 paid to British Rail for the line.

The second platform track was reinstated in 1976, points around the station being controlled by local ground frames. Since 1990 electric multiple aspect signals have been controlled from the signalling panel at Britannia Crossing.

== Description ==
The southern end of the platform and tracks is covered by a rare wooden 100-foot (30 m) train shed, with a more conventional canopy extending further along the platform. The entrance to the station opens onto the main platform within the train shed; trains stop further along the platform to the right to allow the locomotive to run around the train using the crossover at this end of the platform track. The bay platform does not have a locomotive release road and so is only used for occasional departures that have been shunted onto this line to free up the main platform for a second train.

The old goods yard between the station and the waterfront is now a car park and boat storage; the long footbridge at the north end of the station is not connected to the platforms but instead carry a footpath from the main road across to the waterfront. Another car park at the north end of the station is on the site of the turntable and carriage sidings. A few sidings have been retained opposite the platform and alongside the line towards Britannia Crossing, the level crossing that leads down to the Dartmouth Higher Ferry and is the site of the railway's signalling centre.

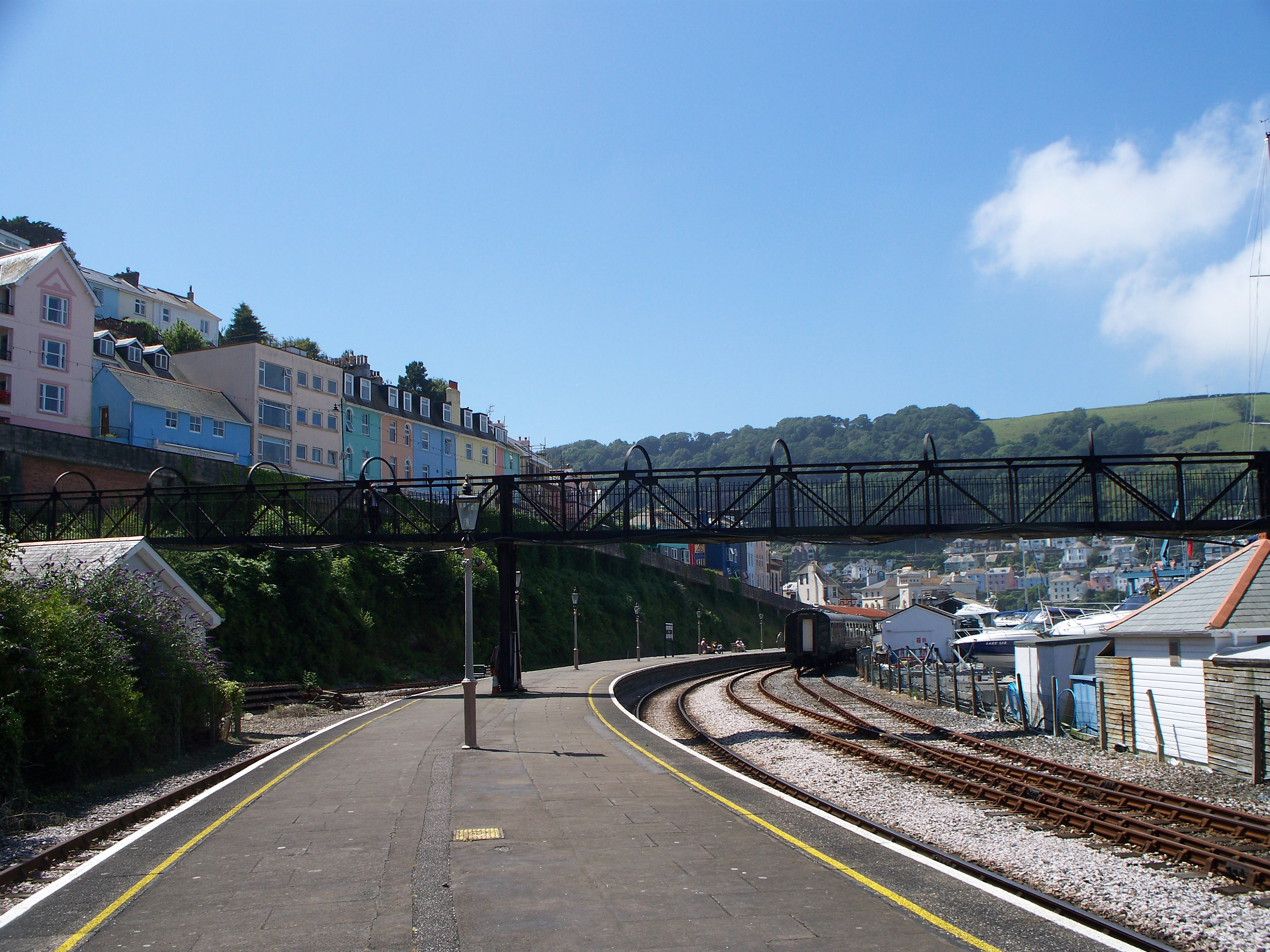
Kingswear Station 23 July 2008

== Services ==
A seasonal service of steam hauled trains operates to and from Paignton.

| Preceding station | Heritage railways | Following station |
|---|---|---|
| Terminus | Dartmouth Steam Railway | Paignton Terminus |
Inactive service
| Terminus | Dartmouth Steam Railway | Greenway Halt towards Paignton |
Ferry
| Dartmouth | Dartmouth Passenger Ferry | Terminus |

This station offers access to the South West Coast Path
| Distance to path | 50 yards (46 m) |
| Next station anticlockwise | Churston 12 miles (19 km) |
| Next station clockwise | Plymouth 65 miles (105 km) |
