= St George's Church, Goodrington =

Church in Devon, England

St George's Church
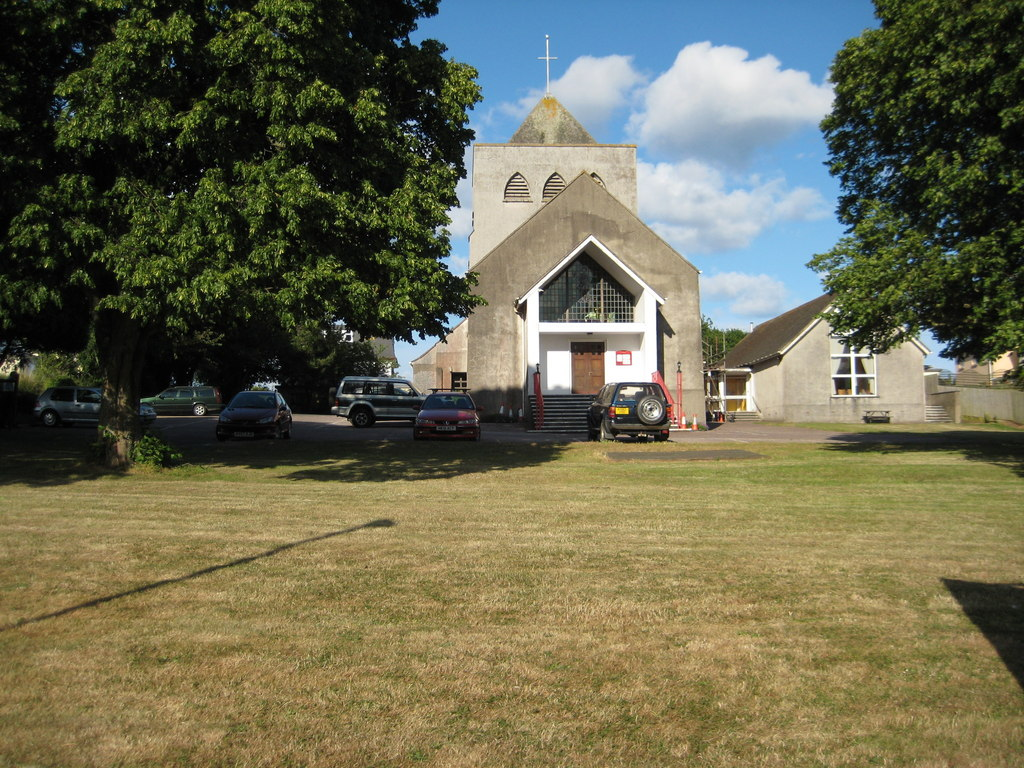

Religion
- Affiliation: Church of England
- Ecclesiastical or organizational status: Active
- Year consecrated: 1939

Location
- Location: Goodrington, Devon, England
- Interactive map of St George's Church
- Coordinates: 50.4174°N 3.5604°W

Architecture
- Architect: Edward Maufe
- Type: Church

St George's Church is a Church of England parish church in Goodrington, Devon, England. It was designed by Edward Maufe and built in 1938–39, with later additions.

== History ==
Goodrington underwent major expansion during the early part of the 20th century, resulting in a small mission church being erected around 1930 as a temporary measure to provide much-needed church accommodation. Later in February 1937, the vicar of Paignton, Rev. B. Montague Dale, launched an appeal to raise £10,000 for the construction of two new, permanent churches in his parish. It was intended to raise the sum over a period of five years, but the appeal successfully raised £5,000 in six months, allowing construction of a permanent church for Goodrington, St George's, to begin in 1938.

The church was designed by Edward Maufe and cost £7,000 to build. The site was donated by Colonel H. Browse Scaife. The original construction work of 1938–39 was made up of the tower, chancel and transepts. St George's was consecrated by the Bishop of Exeter, the Right Rev. Charles Curzon, on 25 March 1939. In 1957–62, the nave and sacristy were built according to a simplified version of Maufe's original drawings. A church hall and ancillary facilities were added in 1963–65.
