= Preston, Devon =

Suburb of Paignton, England

Coordinates: 50.454°N 3.570°W

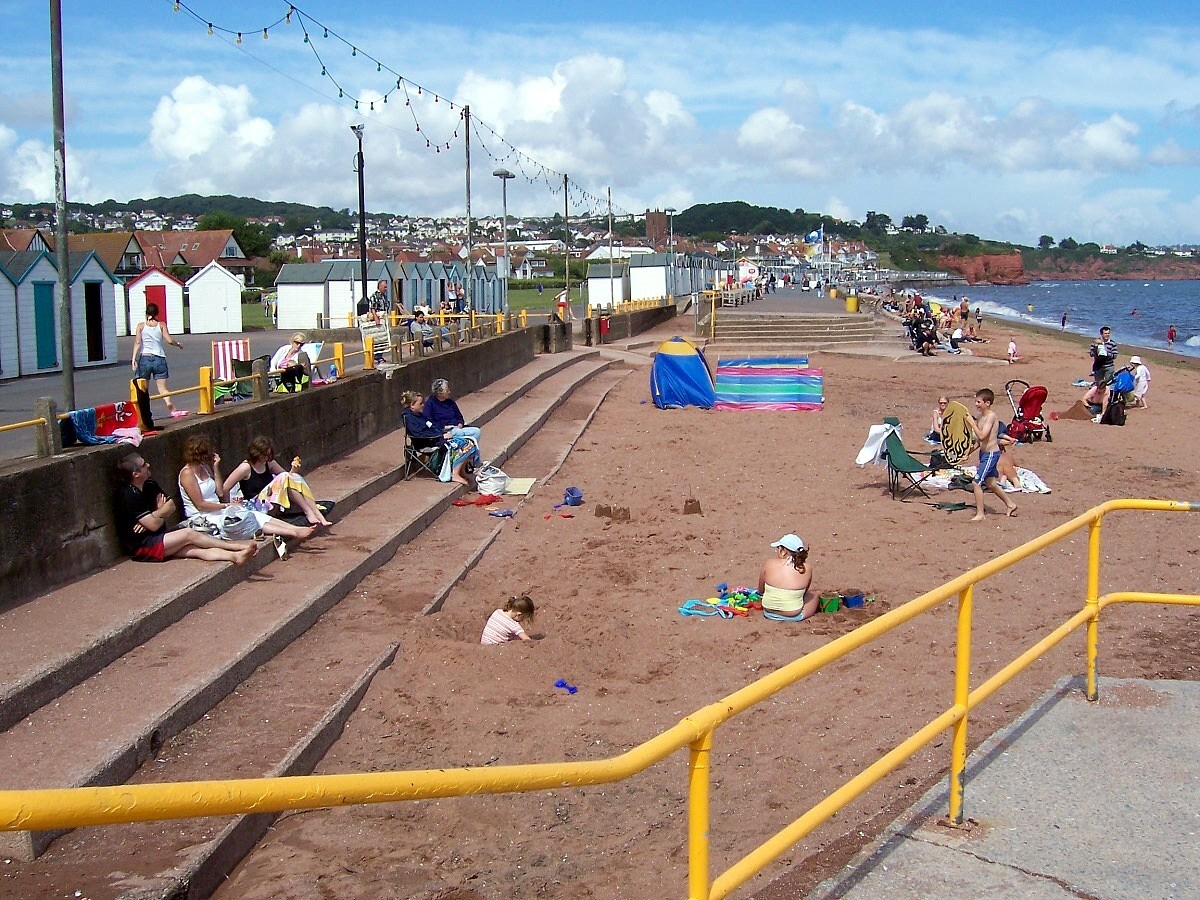
Preston Sands

Preston is a suburb located in the northern part of Paignton in Devon. Preston is a popular destination for family holidays and has two main beaches; Hollicombe, a red sandy beach with cliffs and rock pools, and Preston Sands with rock pools, beach huts and facilities. At low tide it is possible to walk between Preston Sands and the adjoining beaches at Paignton. The ward population at the 2011 census was 10,924.

Preston had a railway station called Preston Platform briefly between 1911 and 1914. The entrance to the platform (now bricked up with grey breeze blocks) can be found on the footpath that runs in a northerly direction below the railway bridge at the bottom of Seaway Road. Preston Platform was the only halt ever built between the Torquay and Paignton railway stations.

The main road through Preston is the A3022 (formerly A379) with Stagecoach service 12 operating every 10 minutes between Brixham and Newton Abbot.

On the edge of the district is Oldway Mansion, built for the Singer family and later home to the Torbay Council offices. After an aborted attempt to sell the building, the Mansion remains in Council hands but as of November 2020 is closed to the public. However the gardens remain freely available for exploring.

Preston has a primary school, Preston Primary, which technically is in the Livermead suburb of Torquay, with the boundary between the towns of Paignton and Torquay running through the school grounds. St Paul's Church was built in 1938–39 to the designs of Nugent Cachemaille-Day.
