= Broadsands =

Beach in Devon, England

Coordinates: 50.407°N 3.554°W

- Location within Devon
- OS grid reference: SX896575
- Unitary authority: Torbay
- Ceremonial county: Devon
- Region: South West
- Country: England
- Sovereign state: United Kingdom
- Postcode district: TQ
- Dialling code: 01803
- Police: Devon and Cornwall
- Fire: Devon and Somerset
- Ambulance: South Western
- UK Parliament: Totnes

Broadsands is a beach on the coast of Torbay in South Devon, England. It is also the name of an area of housing inland from the beach, in the Churston Ferrers part of Torbay between Paignton and Brixham.

It is a tourist attraction, with a range of facilities and a large pitch and putt course on the adjacent headland. The beach is popular for fishing and watersports.

There are good views of the Dartmouth Steam Railway, which crosses two Brunel viaducts near the beach on the section between Goodrington Sands and Churston.

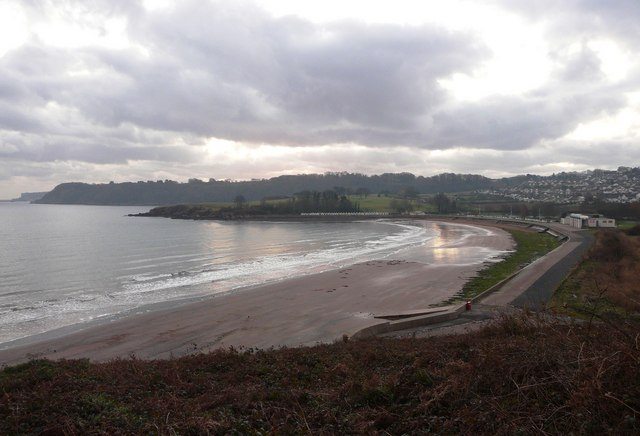
Broadsands beach

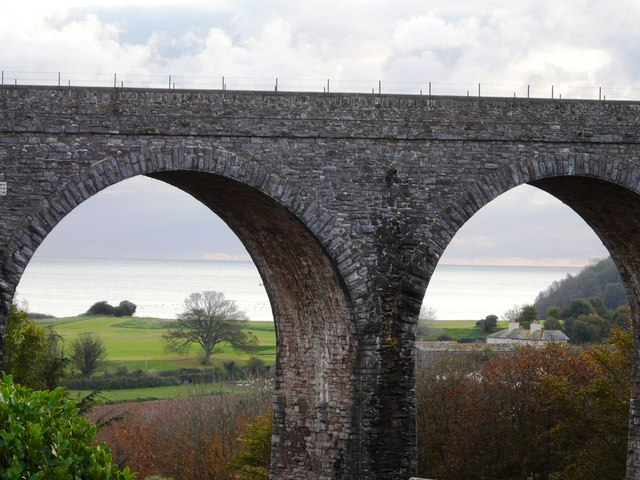
Brunel's viaduct

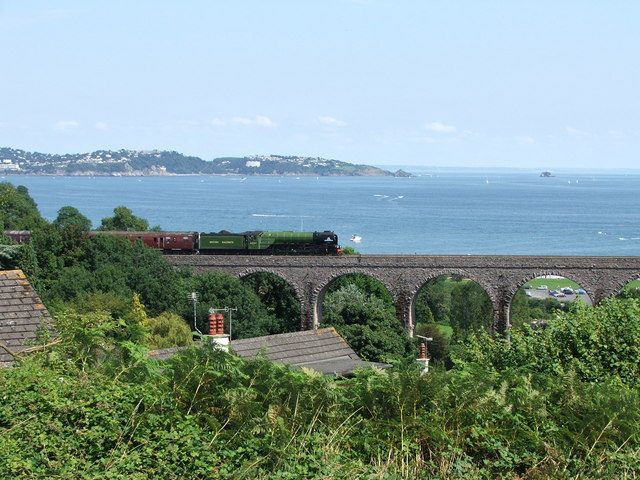
No. 60163 Tornado steam locomotive crosses Broadsands Viaduct

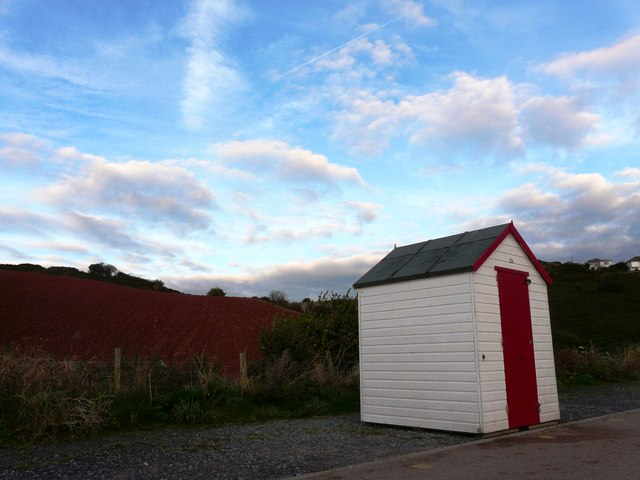
Beach hut, Broadsands beach
