= The Thames at Weybridge =

Painting by J. M. W. Turner

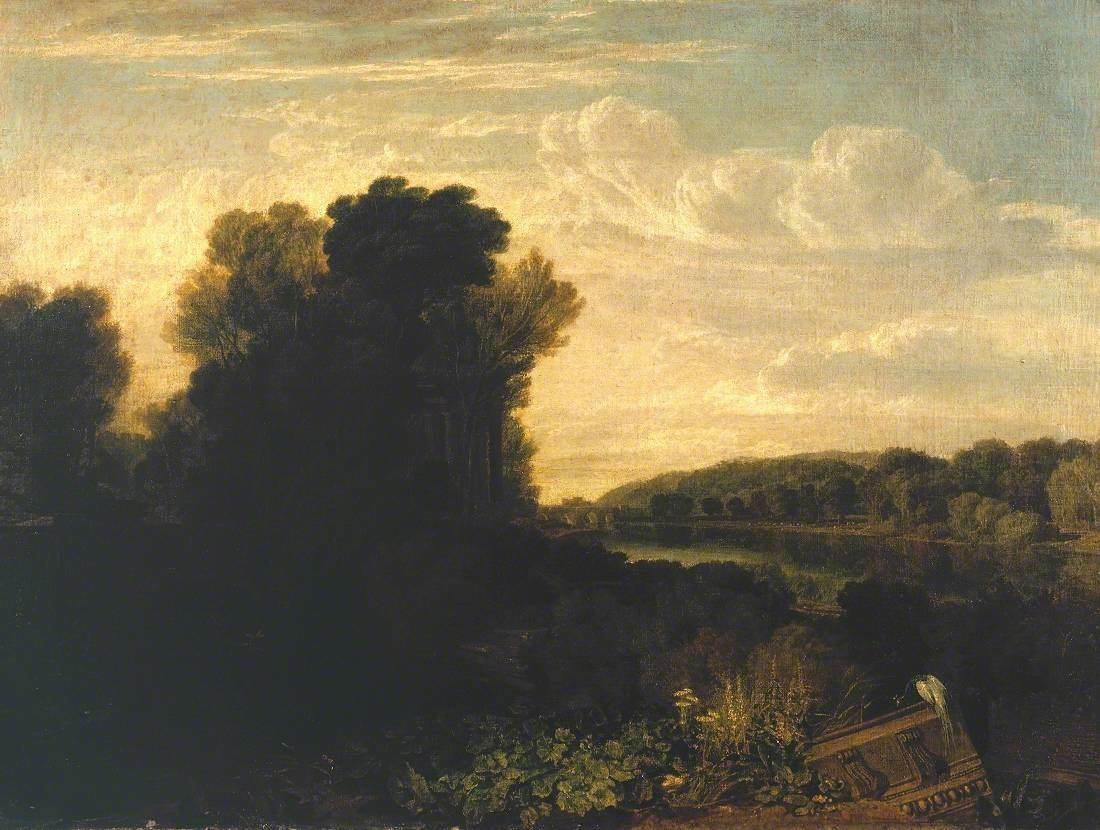
- Artist: J. M. W. Turner
- Year: 1806
- Type: Oil on canvas, landscape painting
- Dimensions: 121.7 cm × 90.5 cm (47.9 in × 35.6 in)
- Location: Petworth House; Sussex

The Thames at Weybridge is an 1806 landscape painting by the British artist J.M.W. Turner. It depicts a view on the River Thames, traditionally regarded to be near to Weybridge in Surrey to the west of London. It displays a visionary, idealised conception of the river with the dark water running between large trees and the appearance of what appears to be a fragment of a ruined ancient temple in the foreground with a peacock standing on it. It only acquired its current title later, having initially been known as Isis, and may in fact show the river at Isleworth, with the battlemented corner of Syon House visible on the left.

The artist produced a number of depictions of the River Thames during the decade including Windsor Castle from the Thames and Walton Bridges. The painting was displayed at Turner's studio in Queen Anne Street in Marylebone. It was purchased by the art collector George Wyndham, 3rd Earl of Egremont for his residence at Petworth House. The work later was accepted in lieu of inheritance and formally allocated to the Tate in 1984, but it remains in situ at Petworth in the care of the National Trust.

== See also ==
- List of paintings by J. M. W. Turner

== Bibliography ==
- Ackroyd, Peter. Thames: Sacred River. Random House, 2008.
- Bailey, Anthony. J.M.W. Turner: Standing in the Sun. Tate Enterprises, 2013.
- Rowell, Christopher, Warrell, Ian & Brown, David Blayney. Turner at Petworth. Harry N. Abrams, 2002.
