= Weybridge Heath =

Heathland in Surrey, England

Coordinates: 51.36217°N 0.45446°W

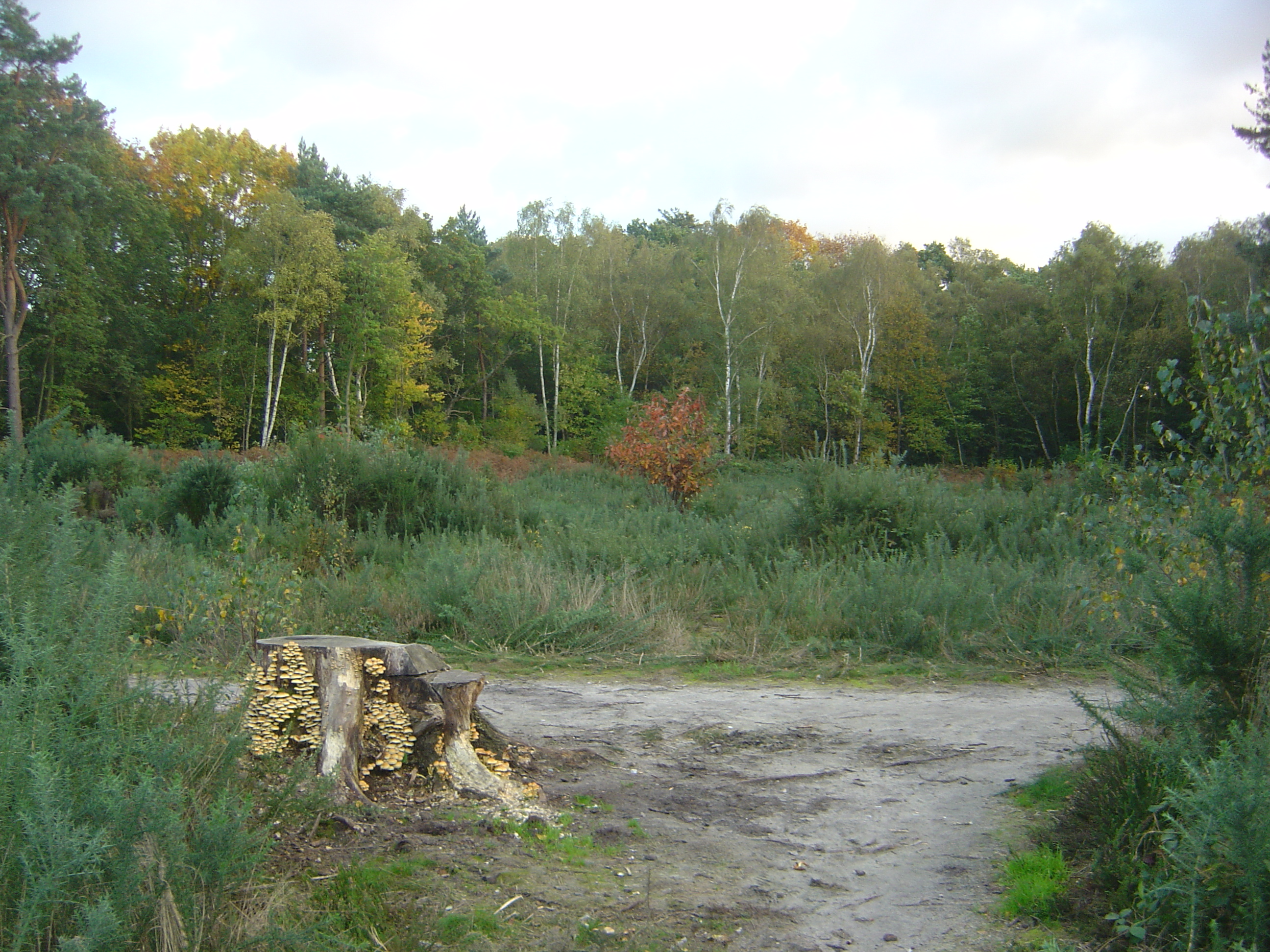
Scrub clearance area

Weybridge Heath is a part of Weybridge common, in South East England.

The Heath comprises 47 acres (19 ha) of lowland heathland that runs from the deep cutting of the South West Main Line railway eastwards to Cobbetts Hill. To the west of the railway line, much of the original heathland is now occupied by Heathside School and Brooklands College.

During the 1970s and 1980s the heathland fell into a poor state of repair because the surrounding brush was ill-maintained and coppicing, which is essential for the maintenance of small heaths, had ceased. Gradually, the area became more and more overgrown with newly grown brush composed of the saplings of deciduous trees, and became to resemble more of a young wood.

Because the area used to contain many species of ants, rare birds and insectivorous plants, Surrey County Council embarked in 1989 upon a project to renew the heathland and encourage the return of the area to its original habitat type. The project consisted of the removal of many taller trees from a central portion of the site, and the clearing of brush from this area. The council hoped that the area would be returned to something approaching its former glory within a decade.

Evidence of the re-growth of heathland is not great as of 2003, and some local residents are sceptical about the apparent defacement of the area, dubbing the cleared area "the bomb site".

It was on the original heath in this location that British myrmecologist Horace Donisthorpe collected many of the ants from which he produced so many observations and deductions.
