= Weybridge =

Town in Surrey, England

Coordinates: 51°21′43″N 0°27′11″W

- Town
- The Old Bridge on the River Wey

- Location within Surrey
- Area: 13.73 km^{2} (5.30 sq mi)
- Population: 15,449 (2011 census) or 29,837 (Built-up Area, which extends to Byfleet)
  - Density: 1,125/km^{2} (2,910/sq mi)
- OS grid reference: TQ0764
  - London: 27 km (17 mi) north east
- Civil parish: n/a
- District: Elmbridge
- Shire county: Surrey
- Region: South East
- Country: England
- Sovereign state: United Kingdom
- Post town: Weybridge
- Postcode district: KT13
- Dialling code: 01932
- Police: Surrey
- Fire: Surrey
- Ambulance: South East Coast
- UK Parliament: Runnymede and Weybridge

Weybridge (/ˈweɪbrɪdʒ/) is a town in the Borough of Elmbridge in Surrey, England, around 17 mi (27 km) south-west of central London. The settlement is recorded as Waigebrugge and Weibrugge in the 7th century and the name derives from a crossing point of the River Wey, which flows into the River Thames to the north of the town centre. The earliest evidence of human activity is from the Bronze Age. During the Anglo-Saxon and medieval periods, Weybridge was held by Chertsey Abbey. In 2011 it had a population of 15,449.

In the 1530s Henry VIII constructed Oatlands Palace to the north of the town centre, which he intended to be the residence of his fourth wife, Anne of Cleves. He married Catherine Howard there in July 1540 and the palace remained a royal residence until the English Civil War in the 1640s. The buildings were demolished in the early 1650s and a new mansion, Oatlands House, was constructed to the east of Weybridge later the same century. Prince Frederick, Duke of York and Albany, owned the mansion in the 18th century.

The town began to expand beyond its medieval footprint in the early 19th century, catalysed by the initial breakup of the Oatlands House estate, the enclosure of Weybridge Heath and the opening of the railway station in 1838. The developer, W. G. Tarrant, was responsible for the construction of housing on St George's Hill in the first half of the 20th century.

The world's first purpose-built racing circuit was constructed at Brooklands in 1907. The track hosted the first British Grand Prix in 1926 and was used by Malcolm Campbell to develop his final land speed record car, Campbell-Railton Blue Bird. Throughout the 20th century, Brooklands was an important location for the aerospace industry and aircraft developed and tested there included the Sopwith Camel, the Wellington bomber and the Hurricane fighter. Vickers established a factory at the circuit in 1915 and aircraft manufacturing continued at the site until 1988.

== Toponymy ==
The first written records of a settlement at Weybridge date from the 7th century, when its name is given as Waigebrugge and Weibrugge. It appears in Domesday Book of 1086 as Webrige and Webruge and in subsequent surviving documents as Waibrigge and Wabrigge (12th century) and Wybrugge and Weybrugge (13th century). The name simply means "Bridge over the River Wey".

Oatlands is first recorded in 1383 as Otelands, which may indicate that the area was used for the cultivation of oats. The earliest written record of Brooklands is from 1548, when it appears as Brokeland. The name probably means "marshy land". St George's Hill appears to have acquired its current name in the early 17th century. It is recorded as Le Bery in 1337 and Oldebury in 1548. The previous name may derive from the Old English word burh, which might reference the Iron Age earthworks on the hill.

== Geography ==
=== Location and topography ===
Weybridge is in northwest Surrey, around 17 mi (27 km) south-west of central London. The town centre is close to the confluence of the River Wey and the River Thames, but the settlement also includes St George's Hill and Brooklands, to the south. The highest point in Weybridge is 78 m (256 ft) above ordnance datum, but the low-lying areas close to the rivers are only 10–20 m (33–66 ft) above sea level.

Neighbouring settlements include Shepperton to the north, Walton-on-Thames to the east, Wisley to the south and Addlestone to the west.

=== Geology ===
The rock strata on which Weybridge sits were deposited in the Cenozoic. The Bagshot Sands are the main outcrop to the south of the town and at Brooklands. From the centre of Weybridge northwards towards the Thames, the surface geology is dominated by river gravels.

Overlying the Bagshot Sands at St George's Hill is a cap of Bracklesham Clay, which was used for brickmaking in the 19th century. Ironstone, containing 33-48% iron(III) oxide, is also found on the Hill, along with a capping of chert gravels, thought to have been deposited by a former course of the River Wey.

== History ==
=== Early history ===
Map of Weybridge with its narrowest and its widest boundaries.

The earliest evidence of human occupation in Weybridge is from the Bronze Age. A number of weapons, including socketed axe heads, a rapier, and a palstave, were retrieved from the River Wey close to the Wey Bridge in 1912. At least fifty cinerary urns dating from the same period were found in the area in the 19th and early 20th centuries. Three of the urns were recovered from a barrow during building work on the Silvermere estate (south of St George's Hill) and were found to contain bones and charcoal.

A copper-alloy bucket, now held by the British Museum, was discovered during the construction of the Brooklands racetrack in 1907. It is thought to have originated in northern Italy in the late Bronze or early Iron Age and similar vessels have been found in Austria, Belgium and Germany. During the Iron Age, there was a fort on St George's Hill. It covered an area of around 14 acres (5.7 ha) and was protected by a rampart and ditch. Most traces of the fort were destroyed by housebuilding in the first half of the 20th century. Remains of a roundhouse and archaeological evidence of iron workings were discovered in the triangle of land between the railway lines in 1981.

There is not thought to have been a significant Roman presence in Weybridge, but 68 bronze coins of the late 3rd and early 4th centuries were found at Brooklands in 1907. Much of the hoard, which included nummi from the reigns of Diocletian (284–305 CE), Maximian (286–305), Constantius I (305–306) and Galerius (305–311), was donated to the British Museum.

=== Governance ===
There are three separate entries for Weybridge in Domesday Book. The first area of land described was held by Bishop Odo of Bayeux as tenant-in-chief and Herfrid of Throwley as lesser tenant. It included 16 acres (6.5 ha) of meadow and woodland for five swine with a value of £5 per annum. The other two entries list areas belonging to Chertsey Abbey, totalling a further 16 acres of meadow, land for four swine and ploughland for 1½ plough teams. None of the entries records a church or a mill in the settlement.

There are only sporadic surviving references to Weybridge in the following centuries. A chapel is mentioned in a papal bull issued by Pope Alexander III in 1176 and a later document shows that Chertsey Abbey had sold the advowson to Newark Priory by 1200. By 1262, the Priory had obtained a license that confirmed its rights to appoint a priest, to hold church property and to collect tithes from the local residents. In 1284 the village was held by Geoffrey de Lucy as a lesser tenant of Chertsey Abbey.

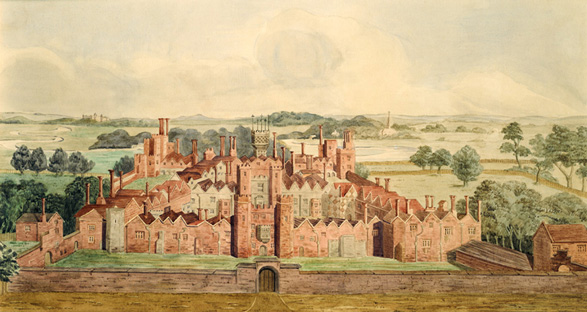
Oatlands Palace (17th century)

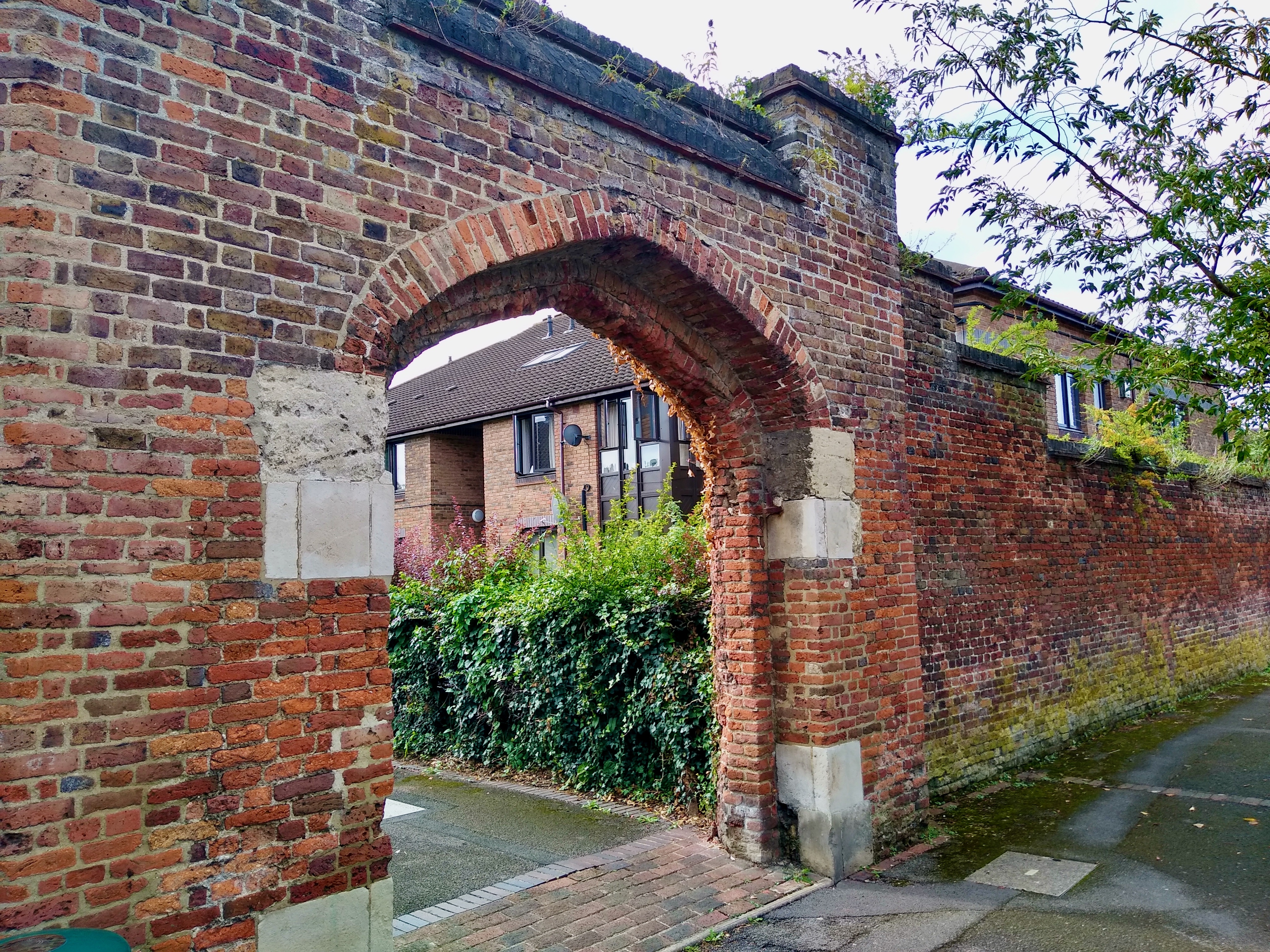
Entrance gateway to the former Oatlands Palace built c. 1545

Following the dissolution of the monasteries, Weybridge was held by the Rede family for three years, before passing to the Crown in 1537. In June of the same year, Henry VIII began to construct Oatlands Palace by expanding an existing late-medieval manor house located to the north of the town centre. Some of the stone used in the construction of the foundations was taken from the demolition of Chertsey Abbey. Henry had intended that the palace would become the residence of his fourth wife, Anne of Cleves, but the marriage was annulled after six months. The king married his fifth wife, Catherine Howard, at Oatlands, but rarely visited thereafter. Following Henry's death the palace remained a possession of the Crown until the Commonwealth, when the contents were sold and the buildings demolished. Only a side entrance gate and adjoining sections of walls, which date from c. 1545, remain.

Reforms during the Tudor period reduced the importance of manorial courts and the day-to-day administration of towns such as Weybridge became the responsibility of the vestry of the parish church. The Weybridge vestry oversaw the distribution of poor relief and the maintenance of local roads. In the 1840s, responsibility for poor relief was transferred to the Chertsey Board of Guardians of the Poor. Local drainage and highways boards were established in the 1860s and in the 1870s a burial board was created to purchase land for new cemeteries.

The Local Government Act 1888 transferred many administrative responsibilities to the newly formed Surrey County Council and was followed by an 1894 Act that created the Weybridge Urban District Council (UDC). Initially the council met at the National school, but moved to Aberdeen House at the junction of High Street and Baker Street in 1908. As a result of the Local Government Act 1929, the UDCs of Weybridge and Walton were combined in 1932. In 1951 the civil parish of Weybridge had a population of 8083. On 1 April 1974 the parish was abolished. The unified council was merged with the Esher UDC to form Elmbridge Borough Council in 1974.

=== Transport and communications ===
The name "Weybridge" suggests that there has been a bridge over the River Wey in the area since Anglo-Saxon times. During the Elizabethan period, the bridge was a wooden structure, 240 ft (73 m) long and 5.25 ft (1.60 m) wide and was maintained by Elizabeth I in her capacity as lord of the manor. The structure was rebuilt in 1808 on 13 wooden arches. The present bridge dates from 1865 and is constructed from brick, iron and stone. A second bridge, downstream of the first, was completed in 1945 and now carries the A317.

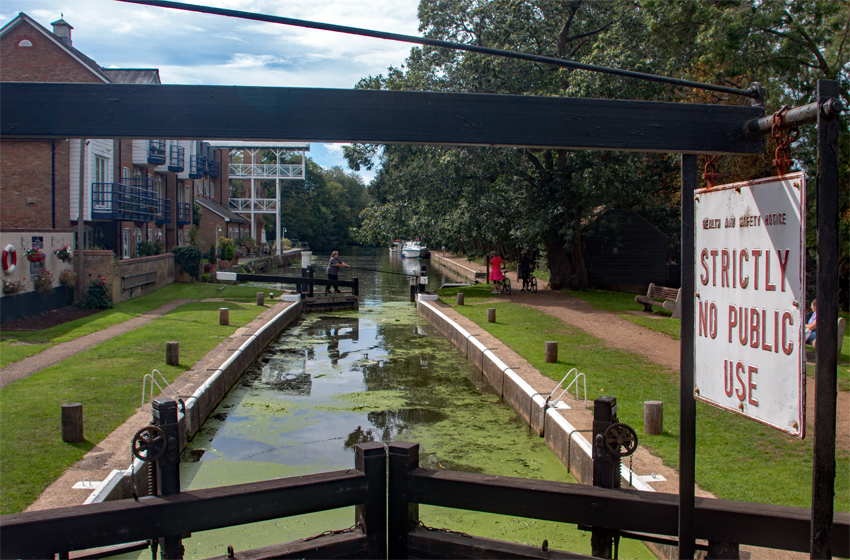
Thames Lock, Wey Navigation

Both the Thames and the Wey have been used for transport since ancient times. By the 14th century, there was a wharf at Weybridge used for shipment of timber and, in 1463, Thomas Warner was given permission to build a dock on his land, which became known as the "Crown Wharf". In 1537, materials for the construction of Oatlands Palace were transported to Weybridge by river. The River Wey Navigation was authorised by Act of Parliament in 1651. Twelve locks (including two flood locks) and 9 mi (14 km) of new cuts were constructed between the Thames and Guildford. Thames Lock was rebuilt in concrete in the 1930s, but like all the locks on the Wey, it was originally turf sided. (Note: The water level on the Weybridge section of the Thames was lowered in the 19th century, necessitating the addition of a third lockgate at Thames Lock, which holds back sufficient water for boats to clear the bottom cill of the original lock.)

The earliest locks on the upper Thames were built in the 17th century, following the establishment of the Oxford-Burcot Commission. However, efforts to improve the stretch of the river through Weybridge did not start until the following century. In 1789, a flash lock was installed at Sunbury, but was replaced by a pound lock in 1812. Shepperton Lock opened the following year. The construction of the locks regulated the flow of the river and increased its depth, facilitating navigation and maintaining an adequate head of water to power mills.

The River Thames through Weybridge was further improved when the Desborough Cut was opened in 1935. The 100 ft-wide (30 m) navigable channel bypasses a three-mile (5 km) meander and was primarily designed to increase the flood capacity of the river. Construction of the cut created the 45 ha (110-acre) Desborough Island, the entirety of which is in Weybridge.

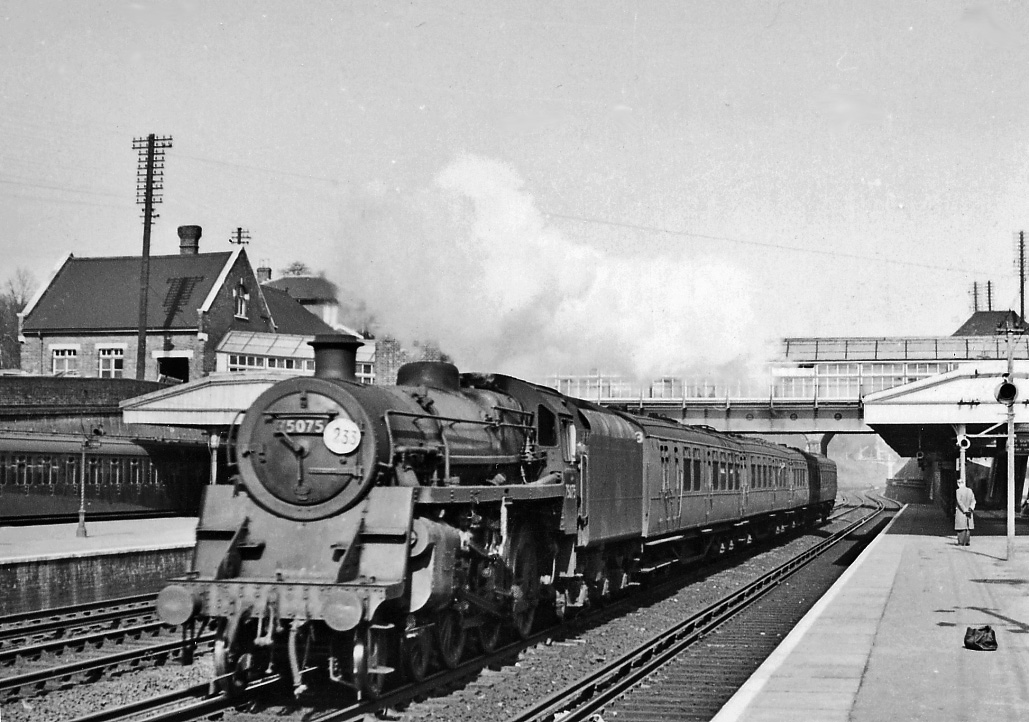
Weybridge railway station, 1958 (Note: A BR Standard Class 4 4-6-0 steam locomotive hauls an express service to Basingstoke through Weybridge, while an electric multiple unit waits in the bay platform to form a service via Chertsey.)

The London and Southampton Railway Company opened the station at Weybridge in May 1838. (Note: The London and Southampton Railway Company had not intended to construct a station at Weybridge, but was required by the authorizing Act of Parliament to build two road bridges over the line near the town. Following a negotiation with the Weybridge Vestry, the company agreed to open a station on a trial basis for 12 months in exchange for being allowed to build only one bridge.) Initially the station had two platforms and was in a deep cutting between St George's Hill and Weybridge Heath. The typical journey time to London was around an hour and, by 1841, a mail train was stopping daily. A junction was created to the west of the station in 1848, when the line to Chertsey was constructed. (Note: The line was extended from Chertsey to Virginia Water in 1866.) (Note: A triangle of railway lines to the west of Weybridge station was created when Byfleet Junction was constructed in 1885.) Additional tracks on the main line through the station were added in 1885 and 1902. The lines through the station were electrified in 1907, although steam locomotives continued to haul long-distance express services through Weybridge until 1967. The goods yard was closed in 1964 and signal boxes in the local area were shut in March 1970, when control of the lines was transferred to Surbiton Panel Box. An arson attack in January 1987, resulted in the destruction of the 1904 station building.

A manual telephone exchange opened in Weybridge in 1912 and was replaced in 1954 by an automated facility in Heath Road, which had sufficient capacity for 2500 lines.

=== Residential development ===
Although Weybridge was still only a small village in the early 18th century, several residents, particularly with more land, were petty aristocrats, retired military officers and London merchants. In 1724 the rector noted that it was increasingly becoming a place for "gentile retirement" and recorded eighteen upper-class families in the parish. The settlement was dominated by two estates: Portmore Park, to the north west of the centre, was the seat of the Colyear family, the Earls of Portmore; Oatlands Park, more of which lay in Walton-on-Thames but almost all of which is in today's Weybridge post town, had been built on the former deer park belonging to Oatlands Palace and was purchased by Prince Frederick, Duke of York and Albany, in 1790.

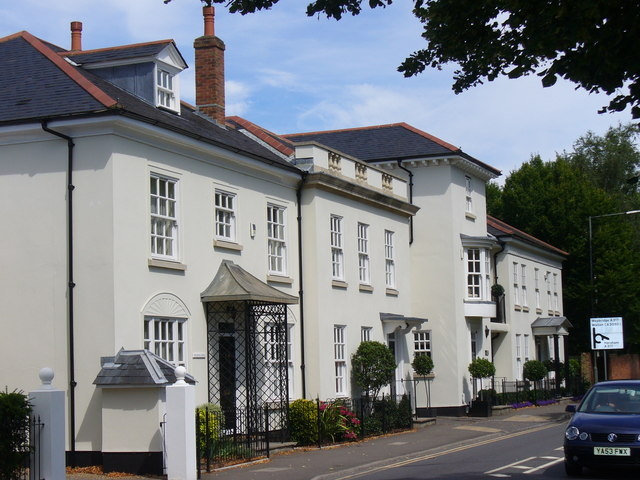
Georgian-style houses at the north end of Hanger Hill, constructed in the late 1990s (Note: The houses were designed by the architect Robert Adam (b. 1948) and were built on the site of the former Stag and Hounds public house, facing the Cricket Green.)

Towards the end of the 18th century, Weybridge was beginning to expand beyond its medieval footprint. In 1800, Weybridge Heath, an area of common land to the south east of the village centre, was enclosed. The Byfleet and Weybridge Inclosures Act 1800 (39 & 40 Geo. 3. c. lxxxvii) enabled the Duke of York to purchase almost the whole of St George's Hill and to add it to the Oatlands Estate. Four years later, Hanger Hill, one of the roads running across the heath, was laid out and plots alongside it were sold for housebuilding.

The Duke of York sold Oatlands Park in 1824, but the new owner, Edward Hughes Ball Hughes, was forced to lease the house and the surrounding 900 acres (360 ha) to Francis Egerton, 1st Earl of Ellesmere, three years later. The remainder of the Oatlands estate was sold in stages between 1828 and 1846. Housebuilding began almost as soon as the land was released, stimulated in part by the opening of Weybridge railway station in 1838. The majority of the houses in Oatlands village were completed by 1859. Oatlands Park House was sold to the developer Walter George Tarrant in 1909.

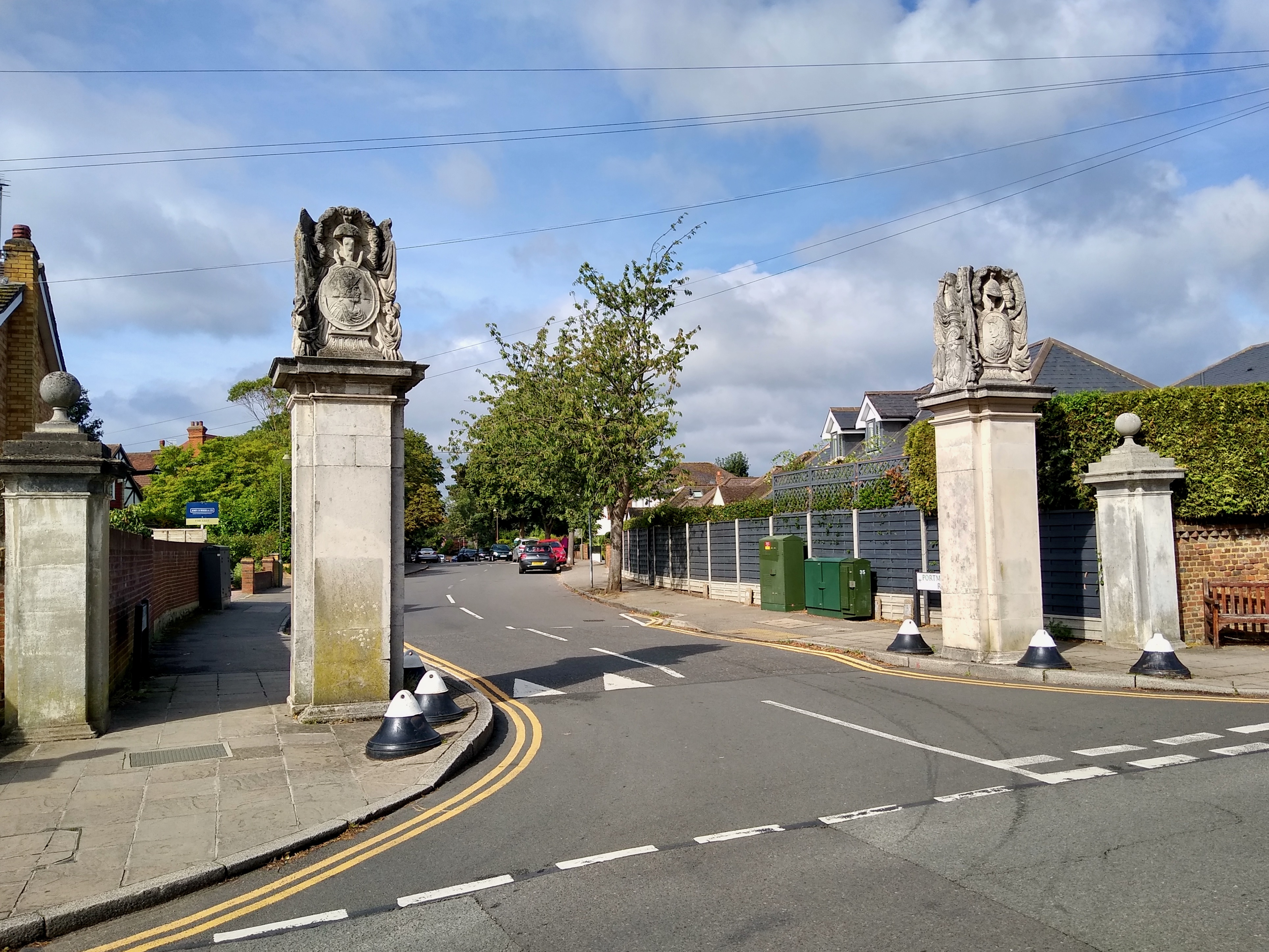
Entrance gateway to the former Portmore Park estate

The west side of Weybridge High Street was developed when the Portmore Park estate was broken up in 1880s. The estate, approximately covering the area between the High Street and the River Wey, had been established by Henry Howard, 6th Duke of Norfolk in the 1670s. It was purchased by the Locke King family in 1861, who sold the land for residential development in the final decades of the 19th century.

St George's Hill was developed by W. G. Tarrant, who bought 936 acres (379 ha) of land from the Edgerton family in 1911. A year later he began the construction of the Tennis and Golf Clubs and published a series of promotions in the Surrey Herald to advertise the houses that he intended to build. Strict covenants were imposed on the development and the minimum size of each property was fixed as one acre (0.40 ha). Construction was interrupted by the First World War, but resumed shortly afterwards, continuing until the start of the Great Depression in the late 1920s.

The first council housing in the town was built by the Weybridge UDC between 1923 and 1927, when 160 houses were constructed on the Old Palace Gardens estate. Following the end of the Second World War, the Weybridge and Walton UDC built over 1000 houses in the two towns.

=== Brooklands ===
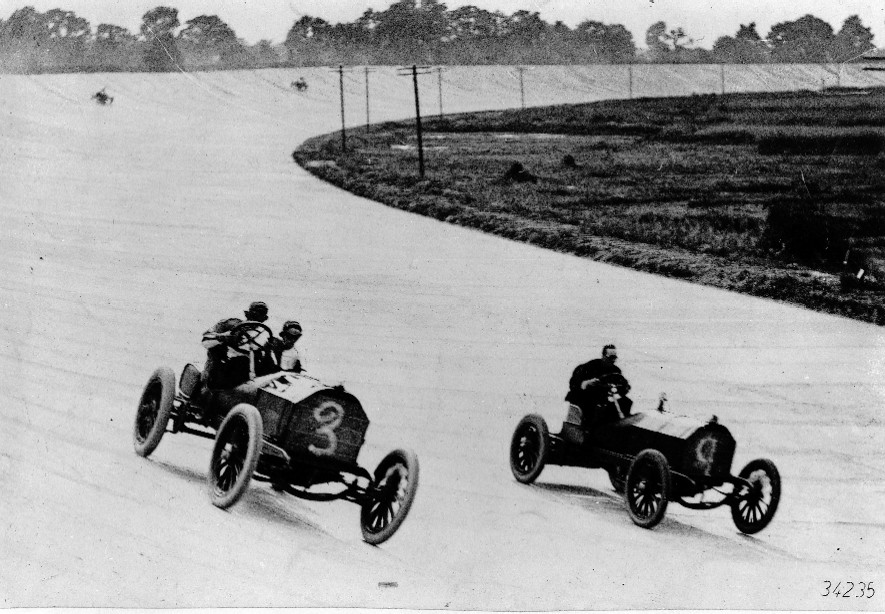
Brooklands, 1907

Brooklands, the first purpose-built motor-racing circuit in the world, opened in 1907. Constructed on farmland to the south of Weybridge, the concrete track was designed by Capel Lofft Holden and had a total length of 2.75 mi (4.43 km). (Note: In the early modern period, Brooklands was a farm. The land was bought by the Duke of York in 1804 and, by 1835, it was in the ownership of Peter King, 7th Baron King of Ockham, Surrey. It remained in the hands of the Locke King family and was inherited by Hugh F. Locke King in 1885.) The first races for motorcars took place in July 1907 and for motorcycles in February the following year. Both attracted a large number of entrants from across Europe and by 1911, the British Automobile Racing Club had established a programme of regular race meetings.

Motor racing ceased for the duration of the First World War and did not resume until 1920. The first two British Grands Prix took place at the circuit in 1926 and 1927. The JCC 200 Mile race also took place at the circuit from 1921 to 1928, and again in 1938. In the early 1930s, Malcolm Campbell developed the Campbell-Railton Blue Bird, his final land speed record car, at Brooklands. Racing ceased for a second time at the outbreak of the Second World War.

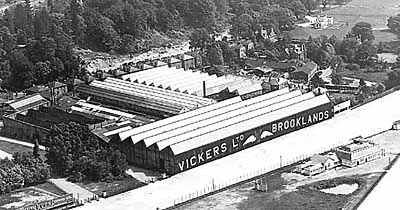
Vickers factory, 1930

Brooklands also played a key role in the development of the British aeronautical industry. In 1907, the aviation pioneer, A. V. Roe, performed the first flight by a British-built aeroplane at the circuit shortly after it opened in 1907. (Note: Roe’s flight took place four years after the first powered flight by the Wright brothers and covered a distance of 79 ft (24 m) at a maximum height of 10 ft (3.0 m) above the ground.) By 1912, several flying schools had been established at Brooklands and the Vickers company began manufacturing aircraft in 1915. The Sopwith Camel was among several aircraft developed at Brooklands during the First World War.

Aircraft manufacture continued during the 1920s and 1930s. Among those working at the Vickers factory was Barnes Wallis, who was involved in designing the Wellesley and the Wellington bombers. The Hawker Aircraft company opened a factory at Brooklands in 1935 and began building prototypes of the Hurricane fighter. Aircraft manufacture intensified during the Second World War and new factories, warehouses and hangars were rapidly built, encroaching onto the racing circuit. The track was breached near Byfleet to improve access for deliveries to the site and a large workshop was cut into the concrete at the north end. Following the end of hostilities in 1945, the track was considered to be in such poor condition that a resumption of motor racing was ruled impossible.

In the late 1940s and 1950s, the manufacturers based at Brooklands started to transition towards the production of civilian airliners. Vickers began producing the VC series of aircraft with the VC1 Viking in 1945. The VC10 was launched in 1964, by which point the company had been nationalised as the British Aircraft Corporation (BAC). Increasingly BAC began to refocus manufacturing at Brooklands to the production of aircraft parts, with final assembly elsewhere. (Note: Thirteen BAC One-Eleven aircraft, out of a total 235, were manufactured at Brooklands. The last to be completed was flown on 19 December 1970 and no further aircraft were built at the site.) Components of the British-built Concordes were manufactured at the site in the late 1960s and early 1970s. In 1977, BAC merged with Hawker-Siddeley to form British Aerospace and the combined entity began to run down the Brooklands site. Aerospace manufacturing finally ceased in Weybridge in 1988.

=== Commerce and industry ===
Although no mill is mentioned in the Weybridge entries in the Domesday book, watermills appear to have played an important role in the economy of the area since at least the early modern period. The earliest record of a mill in the town is from 1693, when a paper mill was built at the confluence of the Wey and Thames.

Ironstone was quarried from Weybridge Heath and St George's Hill, although the dates of these workings are uncertain. In the late 17th and early 18th centuries, iron was smelted at a mill on Whittet's Ait and there is reference to iron and steel manufacture taking place at two mills in Byfleet in 1760. The Whittet's Ait mill appears to have been used as a "Brass Wire Mill" in the 1760s and the machinery required for iron smelting had been fitted by 1769.

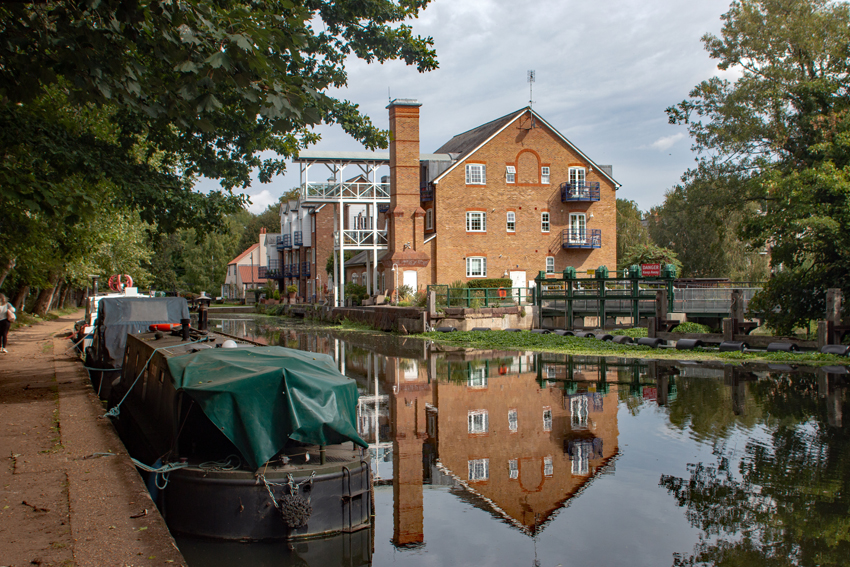
Apartments on the site of the former oil-seed mill at Thames Lock

A mill for grinding malt was built on the Wey upstream of Thames Lock in around 1819, but had fallen into disrepair by 1830. In 1842 a new mill for extracting vegetable oil from seeds was built on the same site and the Whittet's Ait mill was also being used for the same purpose by the 1930s. In the 1970s, Whittet's Ait was the site of a solvent refinery.

For much of the 20th century, Weybridge was a centre for the aerospace industry. The Lang Propeller Works was established on Whittet's Ait in 1913 and, in 1915, the Vickers company took over the Itala motor works at Brooklands. The circuit was also the base for several other aircraft manufacturers including Avro, Sopwith and Blériot.

As of 2021, the European headquarters of Sony and the UK headquarters of Procter & Gamble are at Brooklands.

=== Weybridge in the world wars ===
At the start of the First World War, Weybridge became a training base for the 244 Motorised Transport Company, an army unit of mechanics and drivers operating as part of the 19th Divisional Supply Column. The company served throughout the war in the Gallipoli and Balkans campaigns. There were two military hospitals in Oatlands. Barnham Lodge opened as a 35-bed hospital in 1915 and, by 1917, a small operating theatre was in use and the facility was being run by the British Red Cross. Oatlands Park Hotel was requisitioned in 1916 as a hospital for the New Zealand Expeditionary Force and was primarily used to treat "medical & tuberculosis cases and limbless men".

Ethel Locke King, the chair of the Chertsey branch of the Red Cross, was instrumental in establishing 15 hospitals in the local area during the First World War. She also organised a rest station for troops at Weybridge railway station. In January 1918, Locke King became a Dame Commander of the British Empire.

The presence of the Vickers aircraft factory made Weybridge an obvious target for enemy bombing during the Second World War. The defence of the town was coordinated by the 3rd Surrey Battalion of the Home Guard and five platoons of the C company were stationed at Brooklands. The local civil defence headquarters were established at the UDC offices in Aberdeen House and the council built a large air raid shelter at the Churchfields Recreation Ground. Serious bombing began in the local area in August 1940 and by December of that year 97 residents had died and 1300 houses had been damaged.

A devastating air raid took place on the Vickers plant in September 1940, when 83 people were killed. A 500 lb (230 kg) bomb landed on the floor of the factory, but failed to explode. Five men of the Royal Canadian Engineers successfully removed the bomb from the building before it exploded. Lieutenant John Patton was subsequently awarded the George Cross for his role in the incident. Later in the war, 19 V-1 flying bombs landed in the Weybridge and Walton area.

== National and local government ==
=== UK parliament ===
The town is in the parliamentary constituency of Runnymede and Weybridge and has been represented at Westminster since May 2019 by Ben Spencer, a member of the Conservative Party. Between 1997 and 2019 the constituency was represented by Philip Hammond, who was elevated to the House of Lords as Lord Hammond of Runnymede in 2020. (Note: Hammond served as Chancellor of the Exchequer from 2016 to 2019 under Prime Minister Theresa May.)

=== County council ===
Councillors are elected to Surrey County Council every four years. The majority of the town is in the "Weybridge" electoral division, but areas to the east of the centre are in the "Walton South and Oatlands" and "Hersham" electoral divisions.

=== Borough council ===
Weybridge is divided between three wards, each of which elect three councillors to Elmbridge Borough Council. The three wards are "Oatlands and Burwood Park", "Weybridge Riverside" and "Weybridge St George's Hill".

Between 1966 and 2009, the Borough of Elmbridge was twinned with Rueil-Malmaison in northern France.

== Demography and housing ==
2011 Census Key Statistics
Output area	Population	Households	% Owned outright	% Owned with a loan	hectares
Weybridge North	4,347	1,914	27	37	233
Weybridge South	4,600	2,088	31	33	202
St George's Hill	6,502	2,567	33	40	938
Regional average			35.1	32.5	

2011 Census Homes
Output area	Detached	Semi-detached	Terraced	Flats and apartments	Caravans/temporary/mobile homes	Shared between households
Weybridge North	439	435	398	642	0	0
Weybridge South	499	328	336	908	2	15
St George's Hill	1,152	379	340	696	0	0

Across the South East Region, 28% of homes were detached houses and 22.6% were apartments.

== Transport ==
=== Public transport ===
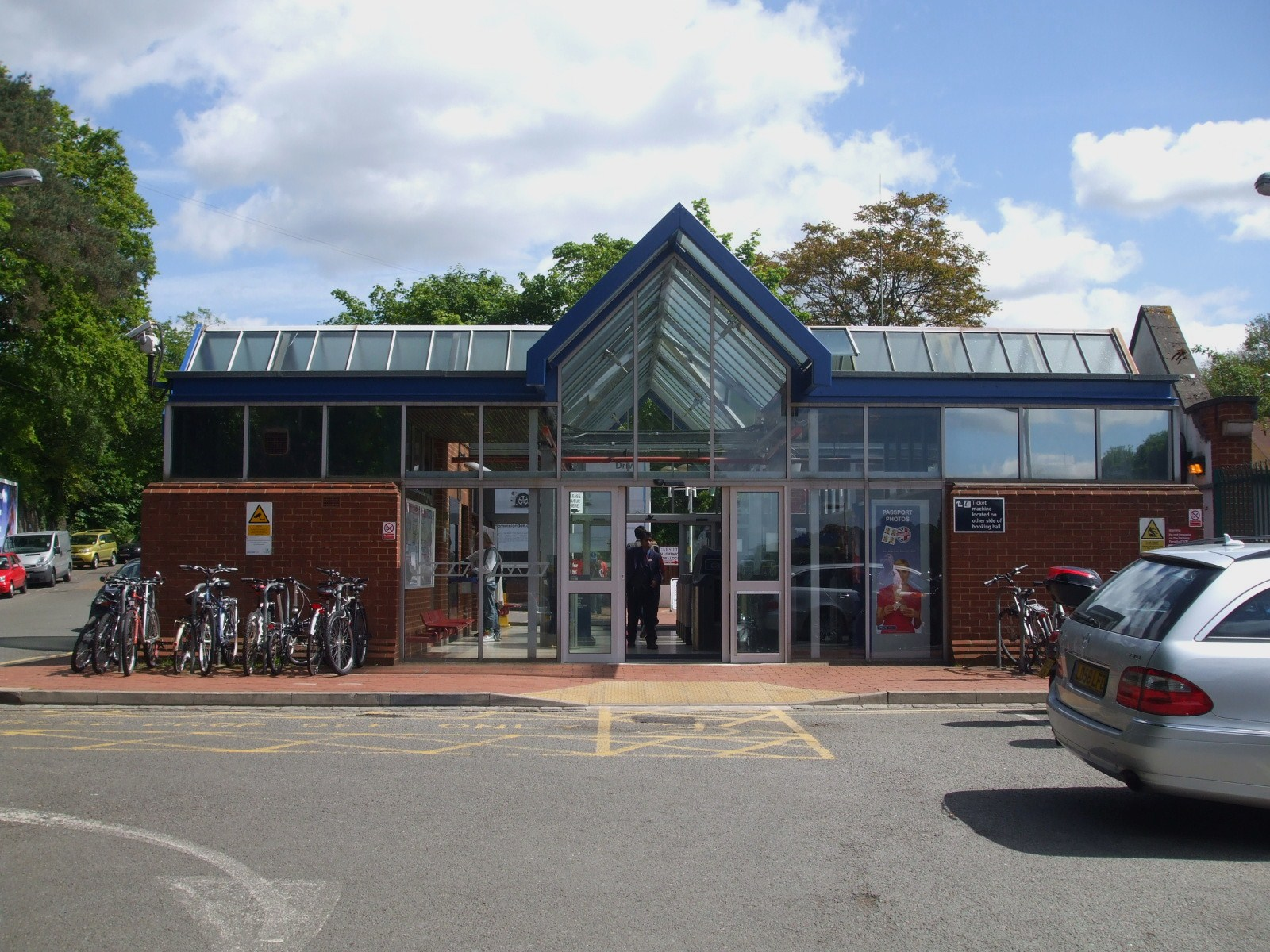
Weybridge station building

Weybridge railway station is to the south of the town centre. It is managed by South Western Railway, which operates all services. Trains run to London Waterloo via Clapham Junction and to Woking.

Weybridge is linked by bus to surrounding towns and villages in north Surrey and south west London. Operators serving the town include Arriva, Diamond Bus, the East Surrey Rural Transport Partnership and Falcon Buses.

=== River navigations ===
The non-tidal section of the River Thames is navigable between Lechlade in Gloucestershire and Teddington Lock. The navigation authority is the Environment Agency. The River Wey is navigable from Weybridge to Godalming and the navigation authority is the National Trust.

=== National cycle route ===
National Cycle Route 4, which links London to Fishguard, passes through Weybridge.

=== Long-distance footpaths ===
The Thames Path runs along the south bank of the River Thames, to the north of the town centre.

== Public services ==
=== Utilities ===
Weybridge received its first drinking water supply in 1869, when the West Surrey Water Company was formed. The water was abstracted from the Thames at Walton, where it was filtered and then pumped to a storage reservoir on St George's Hill. In 1960, the company became part of the Woking and District Water Company. Today, Affinity Water is responsible for supplying the town with drinking water.

The first wastewater treatment works in the town was built at Brooklands Farm in 1895. The works were principally a series of sewage lagoons, but were upgraded in 1939 to filter beds, which were considered less conspicuous to enemy aircraft. The present works, in the triangle formed by the railway lines to the west of Weybridge station, were opened in 1973. Treated water is discharged into the River Wey.

The Walton upon Thames and Weybridge Gas Company was incorporated in 1869. It was taken over by the Wandsworth Gas Company in Oct 1936.

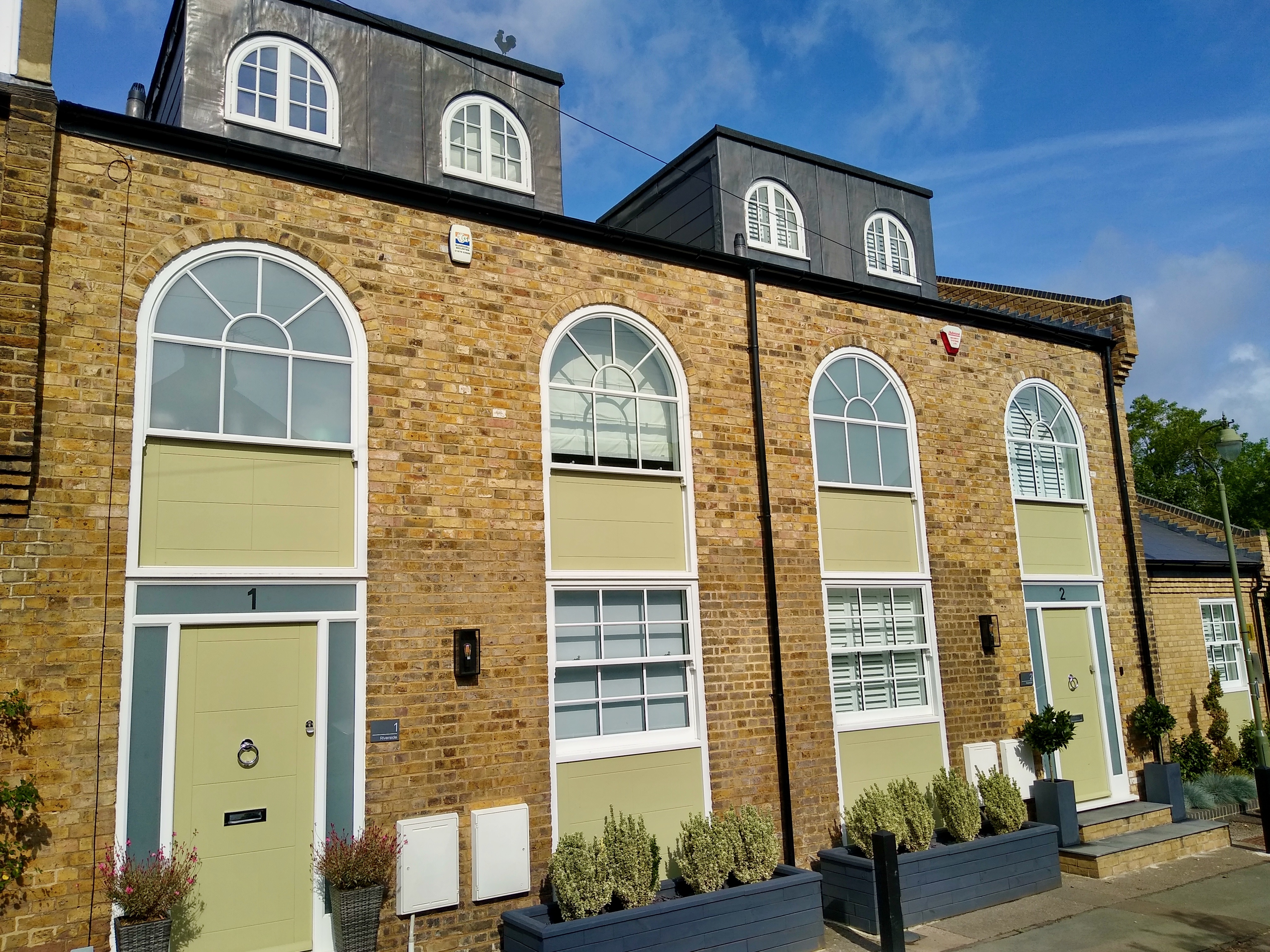
The former power station in Church Walk

In 1890, Weybridge became the first town in Britain to have electric street lighting using incandescent filament bulbs. The power station in Church Walk was capable of generating 70 kW and operated for six years before its closure in 1896. In 1902, a new station was opened in Thames Street with an initial installed capacity of 180 kW, which had risen to 700 kW by the time of its closure 20 years later. From 1922, electricity was supplied to the town by the Twickenham and Teddington Electricity Supply Company.

=== Emergency services ===
Weybridge Fire Brigade was formed 1874 and was initially equipped with a horse-drawn, manual engine with leather hoses. In 1881 the brigade moved to new building in Balfour Road and a steam-driven fire engine was purchased in 1902. In 1921, the Weybridge brigade was made responsible for attending fires in Cobham. The merger of Weybridge and Walton UDCs in 1933, resulted in the fire brigades of the two towns being combined into one single unit. Weybridge Police Station opened 1908 and closed in 1968.

In 2021, the fire authority for Weybridge is Surrey County Council and the statutory fire service is Surrey Fire and Rescue Service. Ambulance services are run by the South East Coast Ambulance Service. The local police force is Surrey Police and the nearest police station to the town is at Esher.

=== Healthcare ===
Weybridge Cottage Hospital was opened in 1889 in Balfour Road on land belonging to Ethel Locke King. It was replaced in 1928 by a new facility on the site of Vigo House in Church Street. The hospital became part of the National Health Service in 1948 and in the early 1960s, an additional wing was constructed. In 1999, a new hospital was opened adjacent to the old, which was subsequently demolished. In July 2017, the building was destroyed by fire, most probably caused by an electrical fault.

The nearest hospital with an A&E is St Peter's Hospital, Chertsey, 4.8 km (3.0 mi) from Weybridge. As of 2021, the town has two GP practices, both of which are housed in the Health Centre on Church Street.

== Education ==
=== Early schools ===
The first recorded school in Weybridge was a Dame School for 12 children, founded c. 1650 in Baker Street. A charity school for poor children was founded in Weybridge in 1732 by Elizabeth Hopton and was incorporated into a new Parochial School in 1813. A second small parochial school was founded on the Oatlands estate in 1862 and was enlarged in 1874 to accommodate 201 children.

=== Maintained schools ===
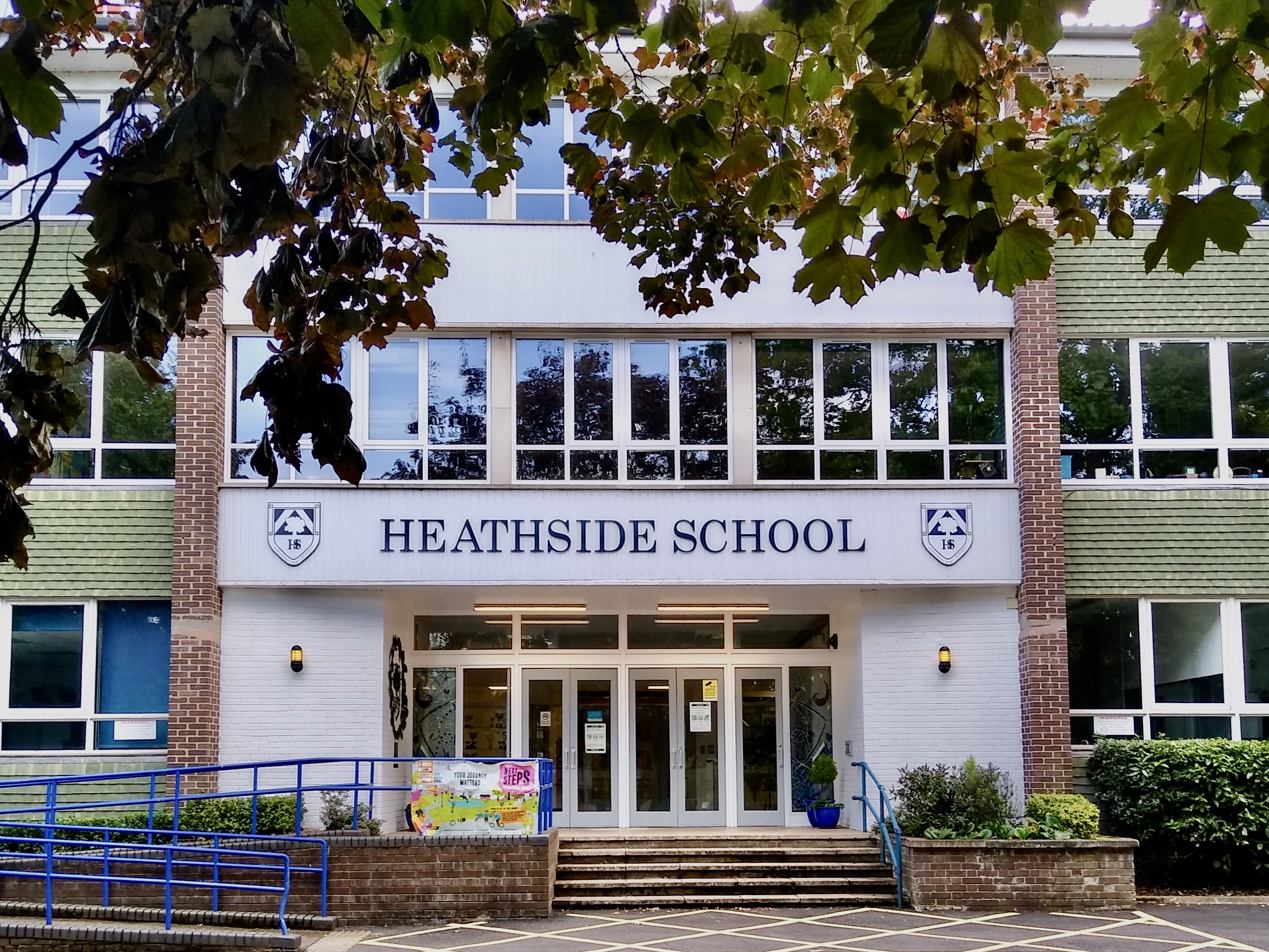
Heathside School, Brooklands Lane

There are several Primary Schools in Weybridge. St Charles Borromeo Catholic Primary School was founded in Heath Road in 1881. It educates around 210 pupils aged from 4 to 11. Cleves School, in Oatlands Avenue, became an academy in November 2010. St James Church of England Primary School is in Grotto Road.

Heathside School, in Brooklands Lane, is a co-educational secondary school for students aged 11 to 18. It opened in 1966.

=== Independent school ===
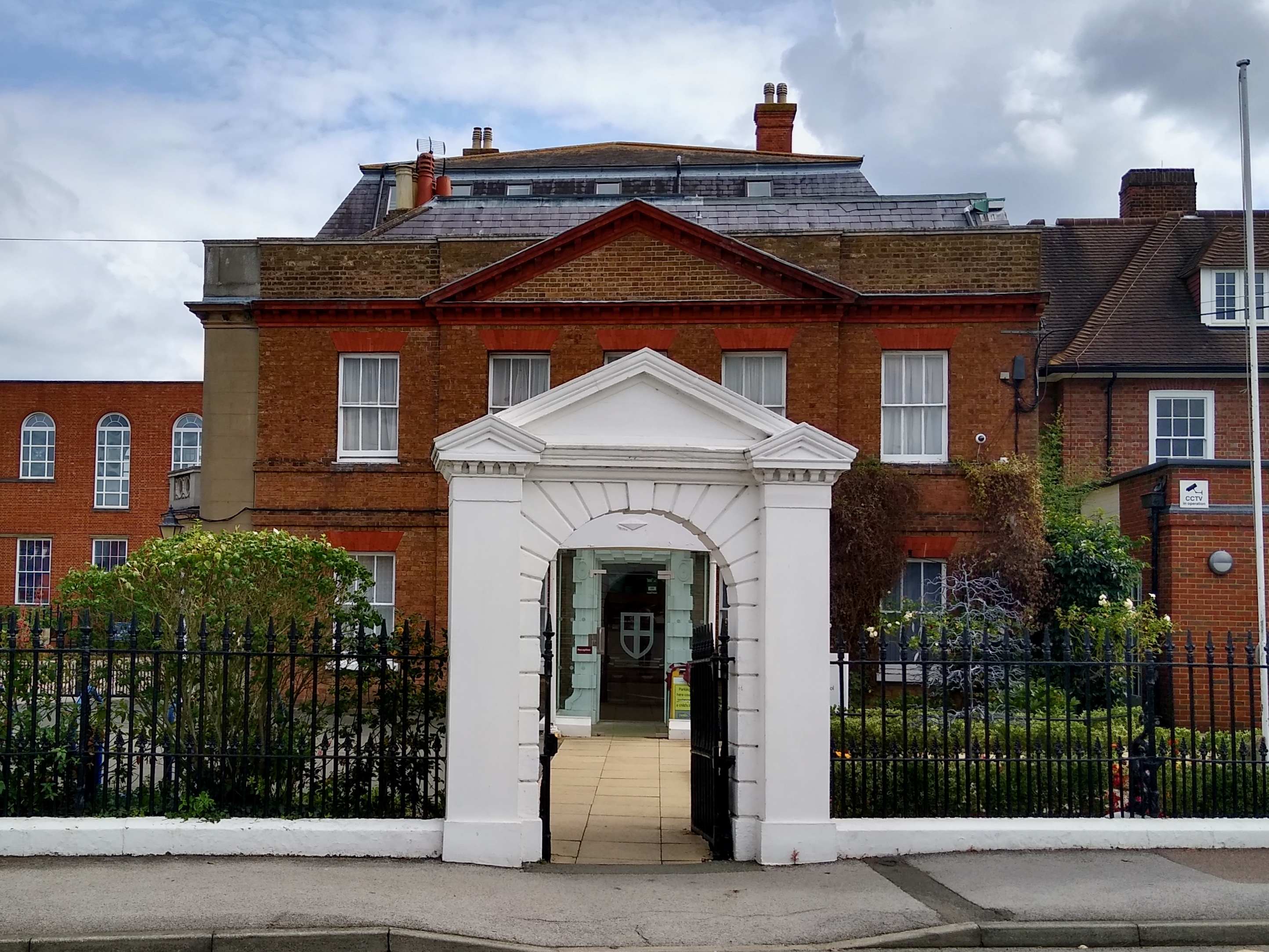
St George's College Junior School, Thames Street

St George's College Junior School is a coeducational Catholic school for pupils aged 3 to 11. It moved from the main school campus in Addlestone to Thames Street in 2000. The site, to the north of Weybridge town centre, had previously been occupied by a school for girls, founded in 1898 by the nuns of Les Dames de St Maur.

=== Further education ===
Brooklands College opened in 1951 as the Brooklands Technical College. Its Weybridge campus is built around the former Brooklands House, a Grade II-listed building, which was once the home of the Locke-King family. The mansion was originally constructed in 1860, but was rebuilt by the architect, Reginald Blomfield, in a Queen Anne style in 1891.

Brooklands College merged with Spelthorne College in Ashford in 2007. It now operates across two campuses and educates over 1,600 students. Higher education courses are offered in association with Oxford Brookes and Kingston Universities.

== Places of worship ==
=== Early church ===
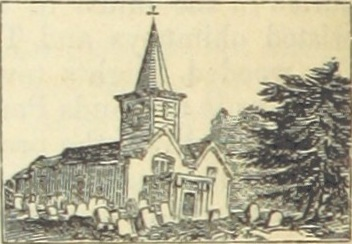
Weybridge Parish Church (published 1847)

There is no mention of a church at Weybridge in the Domesday Book and the first record of a place of worship is in 1175, in which a chapel in the town is listed as a dependent of Chertsey Abbey. During the Reformation, several valuable items, including chalices and a paten were seized from the Weybridge church by the King's commissioners. The font was buried under the floor of the building at around the same time, possibly to prevent it being confiscated.

Major renovations to Weybridge church were carried out in 1722, including the construction of a south aisle. The congregation increased in size in the first half of the 19th century, as the population of the town expanded. By the middle of the century, it was clear that a larger building was required and so the church was demolished in 1848 and replaced by the present St James'. A portion of a fresco from the old church was saved and is held by Elmbridge Museum.

=== St James' Church ===
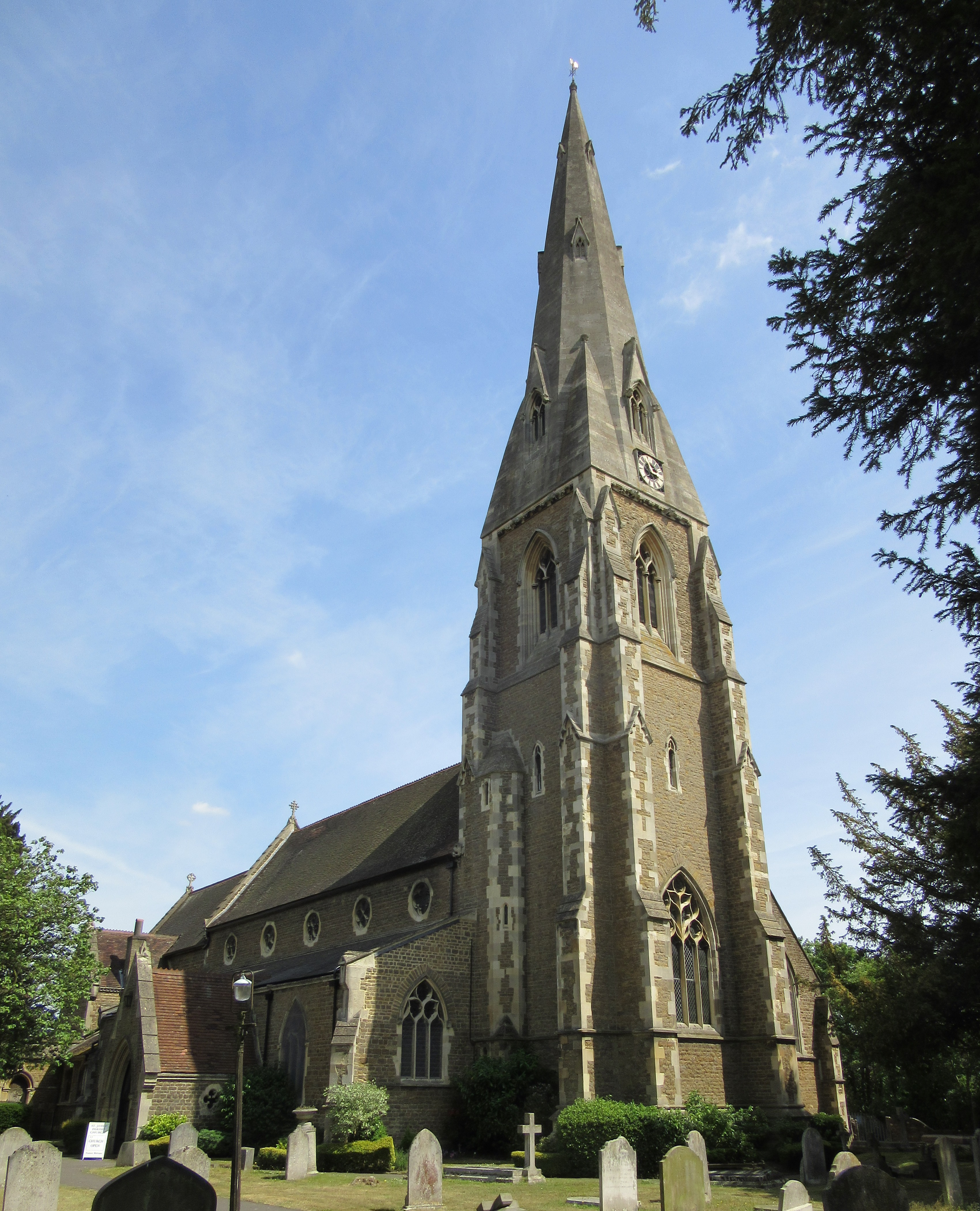
St James' Church

The Anglican parish church of St James was built in 1848 to replace the earlier church. It was designed by the architect John Loughborough Pearson in the Early English Gothic Revival style. It is constructed of coursed rubble stone with a plain tiled roof. The broach spire was completed in 1855 and the south aisle was added in 1864. The chancel is decorated in red and gold mosaics, containing more than 20 types of marble. In 1875, the church was given a ring of eight bells, cast by Taylor of Loughborough. They were re-hung on a new steel frame in 1989.

Several monuments were rescued from the medieval church and were reinstalled in St James'. The oldest is a sculpture of three skeletons, dating from around 1450, which appears to commemorate a man and two women. There are two brasses dating from the reign of Elizabeth I, which record the members of two prominent local families.

=== St Charles Borromeo Catholic Church ===
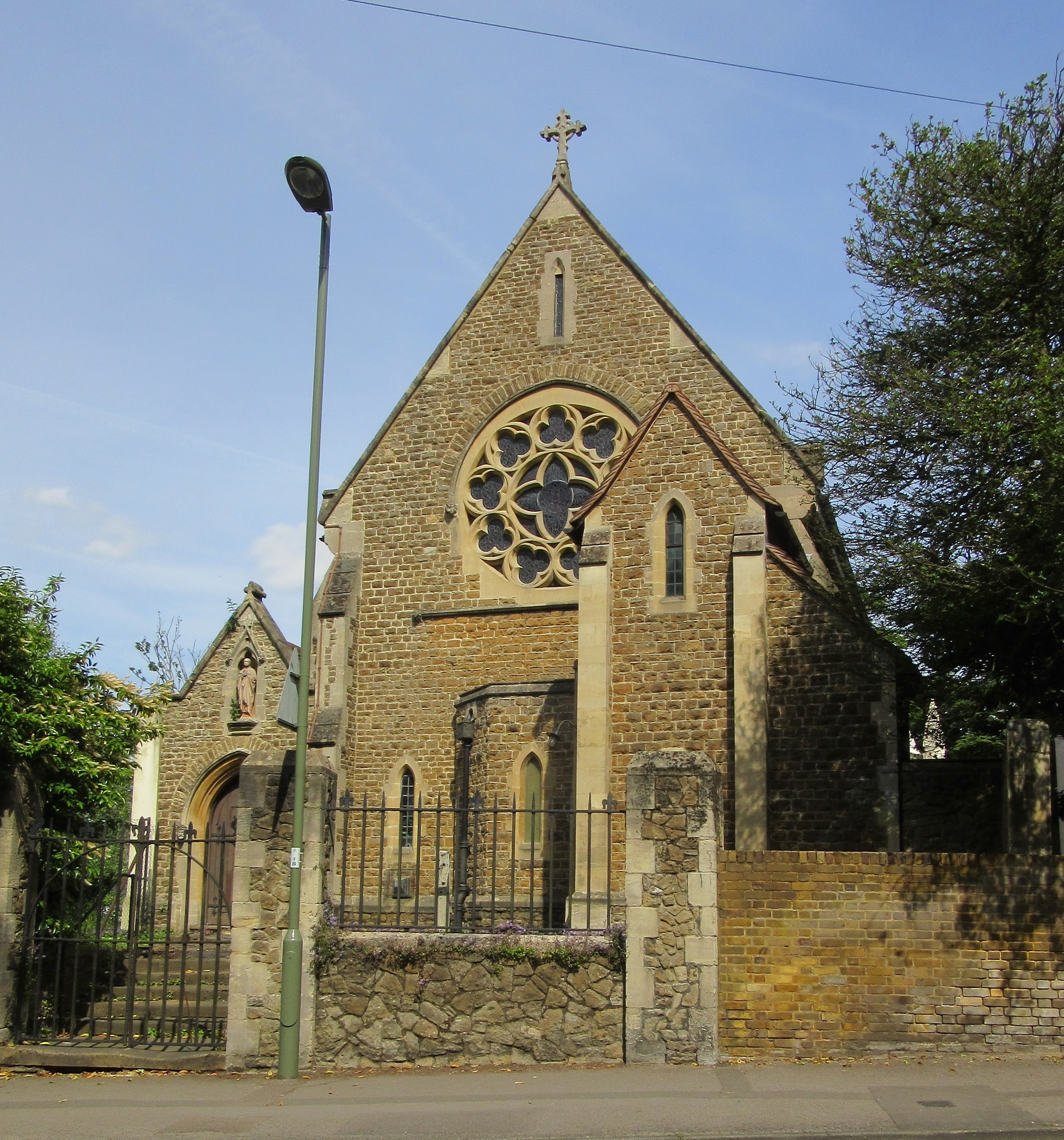
The former St Charles Borromeo Catholic Church is now the Korean Presbyterian Church.

A Catholic Chapel was built on Weybridge Heath in the 1830s for the private use of the Taylor Family and was dedicated to St Charles Borromeo in November 1835. The chapel is constructed from brick, plastered to resemble Bath Stone and has a central dome with towers to the east and west. Following his abdication in 1848, Louis Philippe, King of France, moved with his family to Claremont, Esher. He attended mass at the chapel until his death in 1850. He and ten other members of his family were buried in the crypt, but their bodies were subsequently returned to France for reinterment.

A church adjoining the chapel was designed by the architect, Alfred Edward Purdie, and built in 1880. It served as the local Catholic Church until the congregation moved to the newly constructed Christ the Prince of Peace Church in 1989. The church was sold to the World Mission Korean Presbyterian Church in 1993 and a restoration project was awarded funding by English Heritage in 2005.

=== Christ the Prince of Peace Catholic Church ===
Christ the Prince of Peace Catholic Church opened in Advent 1989, succeeding St Charles Borromeo and the demolished St Martin de Porres. The benches, statues and the crucifix over the altar were recovered from the old churches and installed in the new church.

=== Weybridge United Reformed Church ===
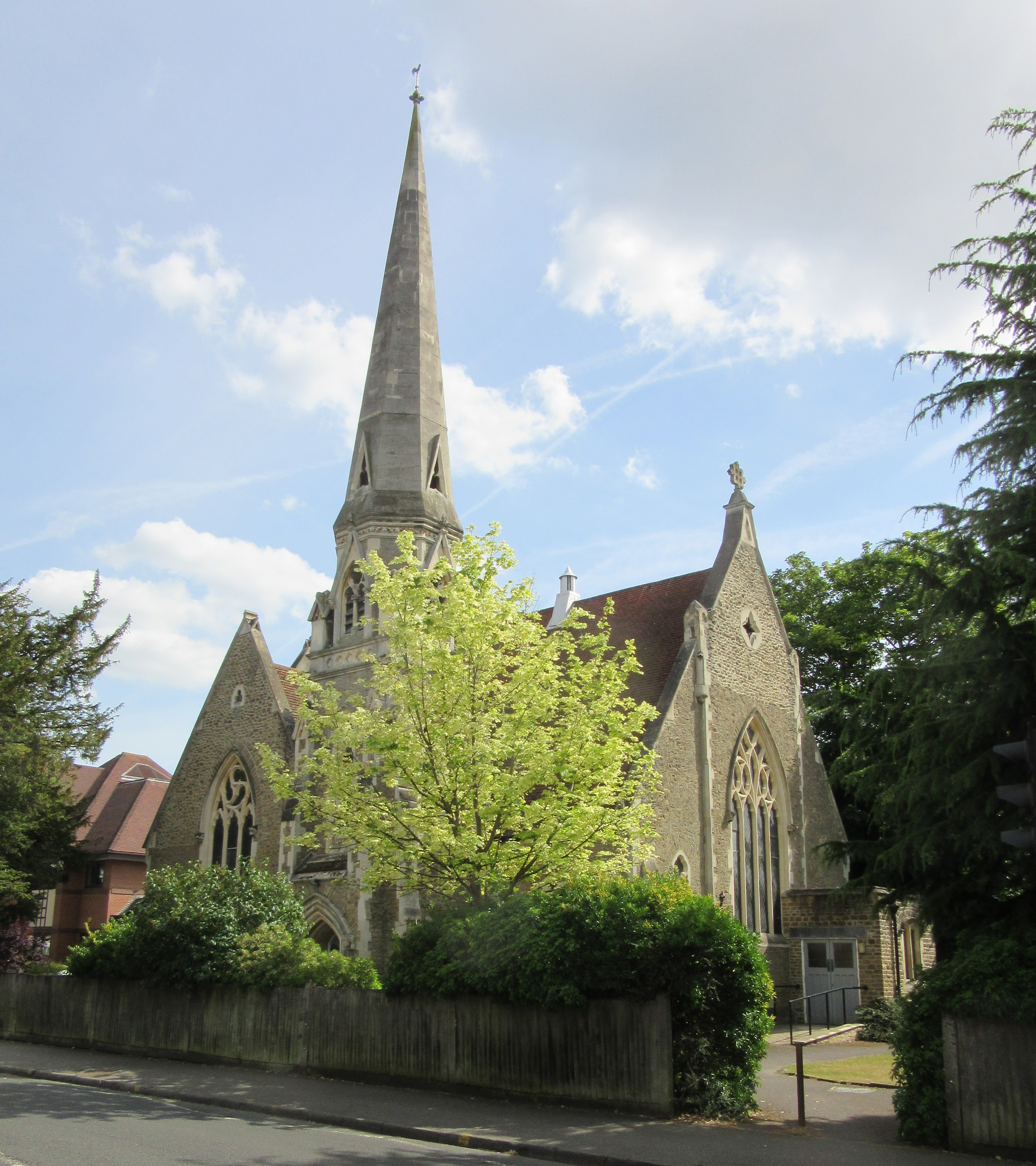
Weybridge United Reformed Church

The Nonconformist community in Weybridge traces its origins to 1855, when Congregational services were conducted in a hired cottage in Thames Street for a short period. Five years later, Benjamin Scott, the Chamberlain of the City of London began to hold open-air services in the town.

The foundation stone of Weybridge United Reformed Church was laid on 4 July 1864 by John Remington Mills. The church, designed in the mixed style by John Tarring, was opened the following year. The building is constructed of rubble masonry, dressed with ashlar, and has a square tower with a hexagonal spire. Architectural historian Nikolaus Pevsner described the appearance of the church as "ferocious".

=== St Mary Oatlands ===
St Mary Oatlands was founded as a chapel in the Parish of Walton-on-Thames in 1867, but two years later, became a church with its own parish. Extensions to the original structure include the tower, built in 1905, and the Chapel of the Resurrection, built in 1920.

=== Weybridge Methodist Church ===
Weybridge Methodist Church was designed by the architect, Josiah Gunton, and the foundation stone was laid in June 1900. The adjacent Hayfield Hall was built in 1937. The church was severely damaged by fire in 1977, but was reopened in 1980.

=== North West Surrey Synagogue ===
The first Jewish congregation in Weybridge began meeting in the late 1930s in Finnart House, a school for Jewish boys. North West Surrey Synagogue was founded there in 1968, but moved to new premises in Princes Road in 1981. Four years later, the congregation relocated to its current home, Horvath Close, named in honour of one of the founding members, Imre Horvath. In 2021, the synagogue is affiliated to the Movement for Reform Judaism.

== Culture ==
=== Art ===
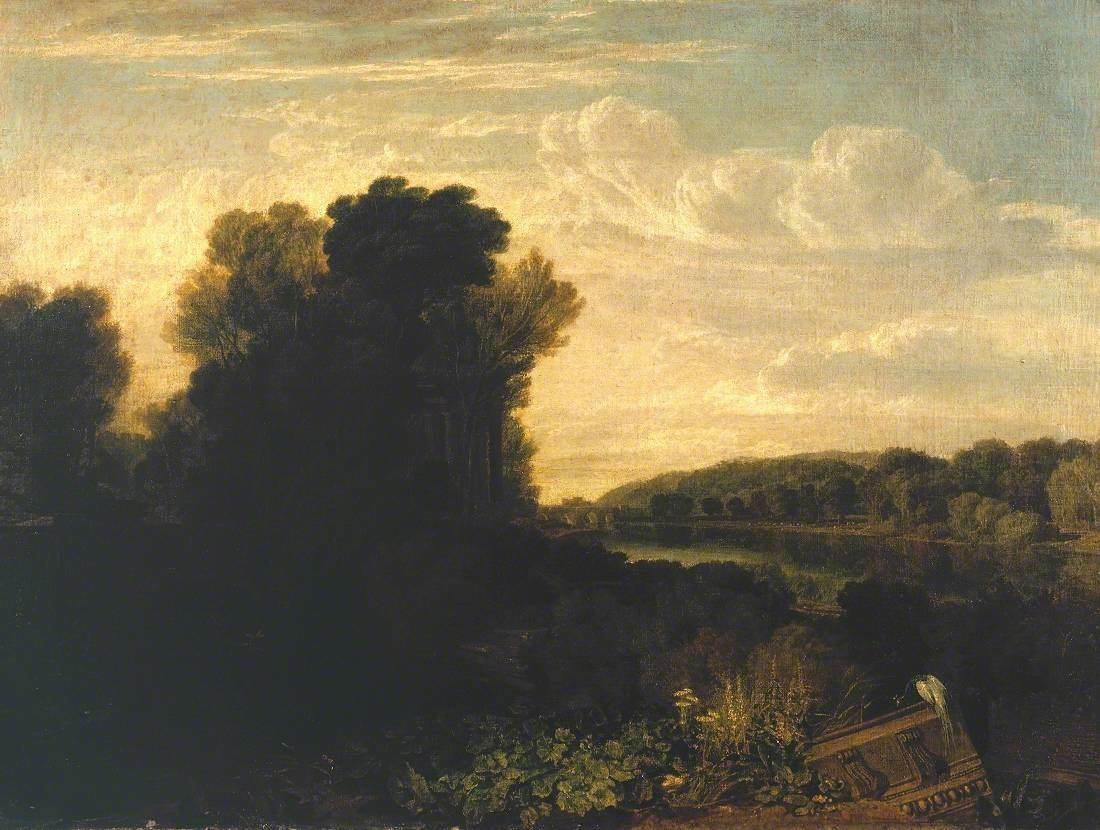
The Thames at Weybridge (1805–06) by J. M. W. Turner (1775–1851)

The Thames at Weybridge painted by J. M. W. Turner in 1805–6 is held by the Tate. The Elmbridge Museum collection includes works by Charles Claude Houssard (1884–1958), Edwin Lock (active 1929–1961), and Nancy Wallis. Guildford House Gallery holds two riverside views of Weybridge by Winifred Schofield (d. 2000). Brooklands Museum holds a number of artworks that reference the area's motor racing and aviation heritage.

=== Literature ===
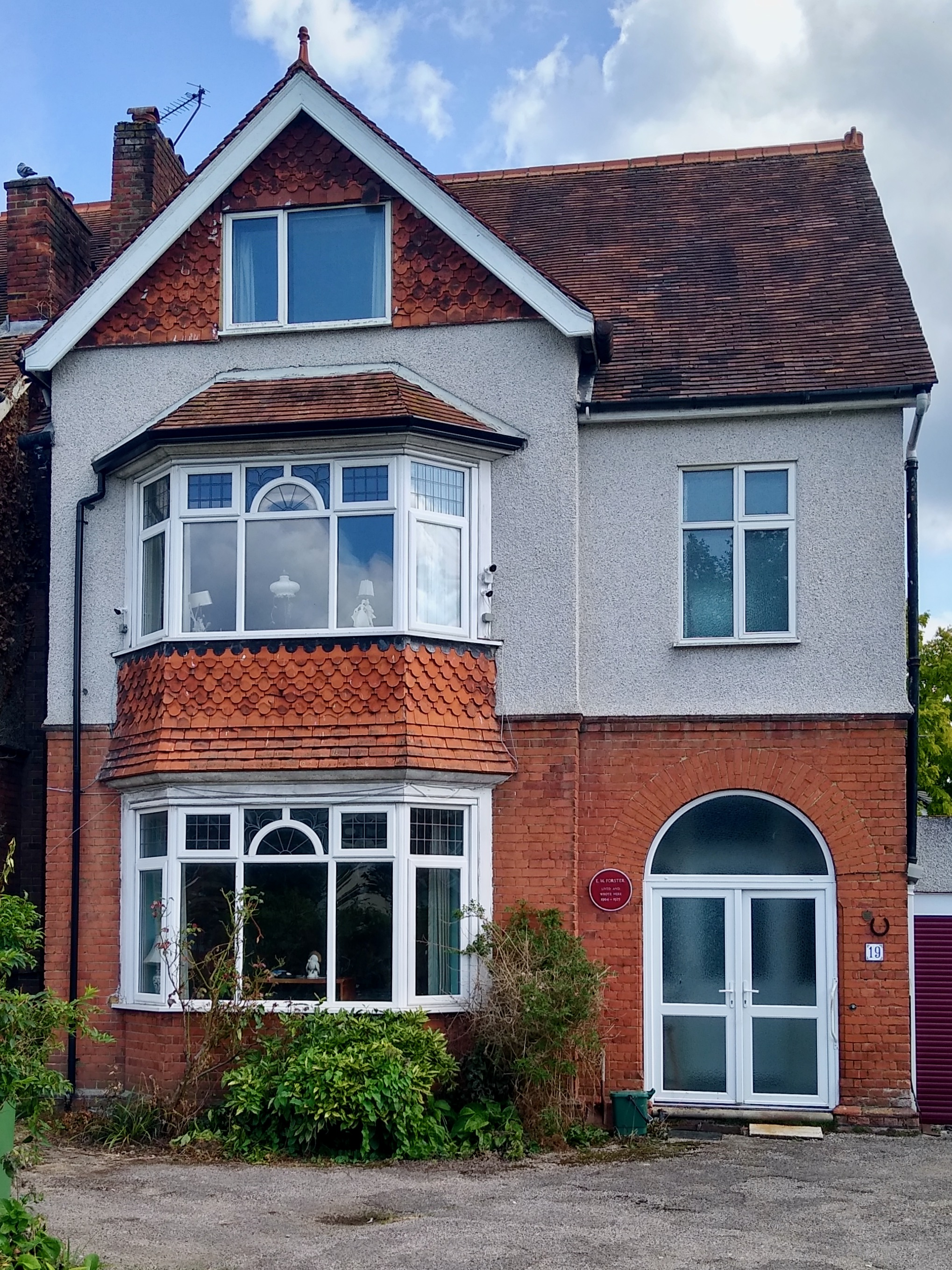
19 Monument Green, the former residence of E. M. Forster

Several authors have lived in Weybridge. The writer George Meredith moved to the town with his first wife in 1849. Whilst living at Weybridge he wrote The Shaving of Shagpat: An Arabian Entertainment, his first work of fiction, which was published in 1856. He moved to Box Hill in 1868. Following the Dreyfus affair, the French novelist Émile Zola (1840–1902) was exiled to England from July 1898 to June 1899, during which time he lived at the Oatlands Park Hotel. The novelist E. M. Forster (1879–1970) lived at 19 Monument Green from 1904 until 1912, during which he wrote all six of his novels. A plaque recording his residence in Weybridge was installed on the outside wall of his former home in the 1980s. The novelist Warwick Deeping lived on Brooklands Lane from 1918 until his death in 1950.

The town is mentioned in several works of literature. Chapter 12 of H. G. Wells' novel The War of the Worlds (1897) is entitled "What I saw of the destruction of Weybridge and Shepperton". During the chapter, an armoured Martian is disabled by an artillery shell and collapses into the River Thames. In John Wyndham's novel The Kraken Wakes (1953), the main characters are stopped in their attempt to reach Cornwall on a dinghy through a flooded England in the "Staines-Weybridge area". In Salman Rushdie's novel The Satanic Verses (1988), Weybridge is referred to by one of Saladin Chamcha's interrogators as his place of residence.

=== Music ===
The rock band, You Me at Six, was formed in Weybridge in 2004. Four members of the group attended Brooklands College. Amateur choirs rehearsing and performing regularly in the town include the Treble Clef Choir for ladies' voices and the Weybridge Male Voice Choir.

== Sport and leisure ==
=== Cricket ===
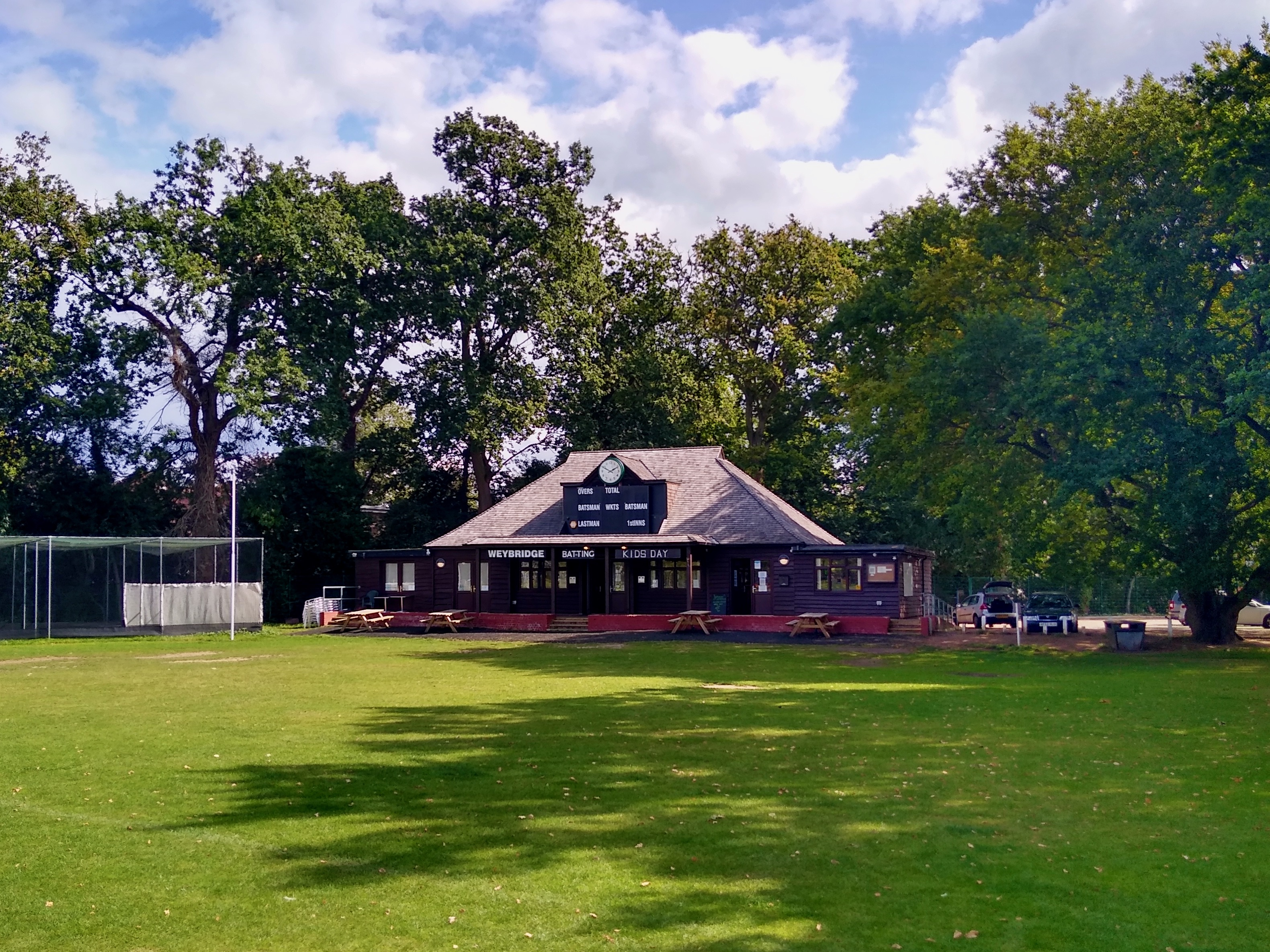
Weybridge Cricket Club pavilion

Weybridge Cricket Club was formed in 1924, by the merger of two existing clubs, the oldest of which was founded before 1870. Cricket is thought to have been played on Weybridge Green since at least 1814. (Note: In 1814, the landlord of the Stag and Hounds public house was given permission by the vestry to landscape a former gravel pit to create the Weybridge Cricket Green.) In 1921, the UDC improved the ground by levelling the surface and the surrounding banking.

Weybridge Vandals Cricket Club traces its origins to two clubs formed in the early 20th century. Brownacres Cricket Club was founded in 1938, but changed its name to University Vandalls CC in 1953. In 1975, it merged with the Olinda CC, which had been formed in 1924.

=== Golf ===
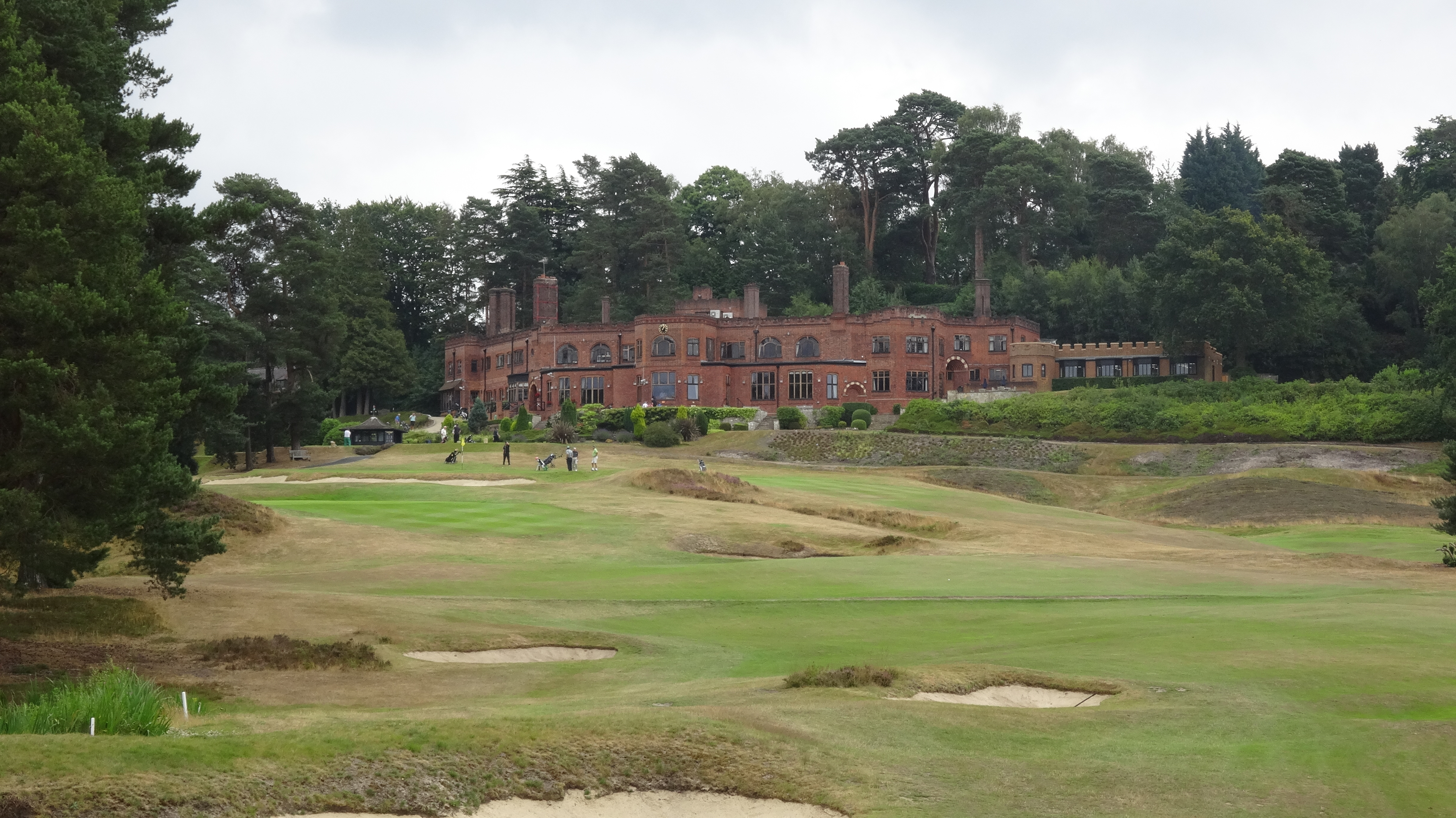
St George's Hill Golf Club and Clubhouse

St George's Hill Golf Course was designed by the architect Harry Colt and the first 18 holes opened in 1913. The course was constructed on land owned by W. G. Tarrant, who intended the course to complement the surrounding housing development. The original club house was burnt down in March 1920 and was replaced the same year. The future Edward VIII was president of the club from 1934 to 1935 and his brother the future George VI was also a member. The German Foreign Minister, Joachim von Ribbentrop, visited the club in 1937. A second 18-hole course, also designed by Colt, was opened in 1929, but was reduced to nine holes in 1946.

Silvermere Golf Course was designed by Neil Coles and Brian Huggett and opened in 1976. The 18-hole course surrounds Silvermere Lake, where Barnes Wallace tested prototypes of his bouncing bomb. Both the 17th and 18th holes require golfers to play the ball across the surface of the lake.

=== Rowing ===
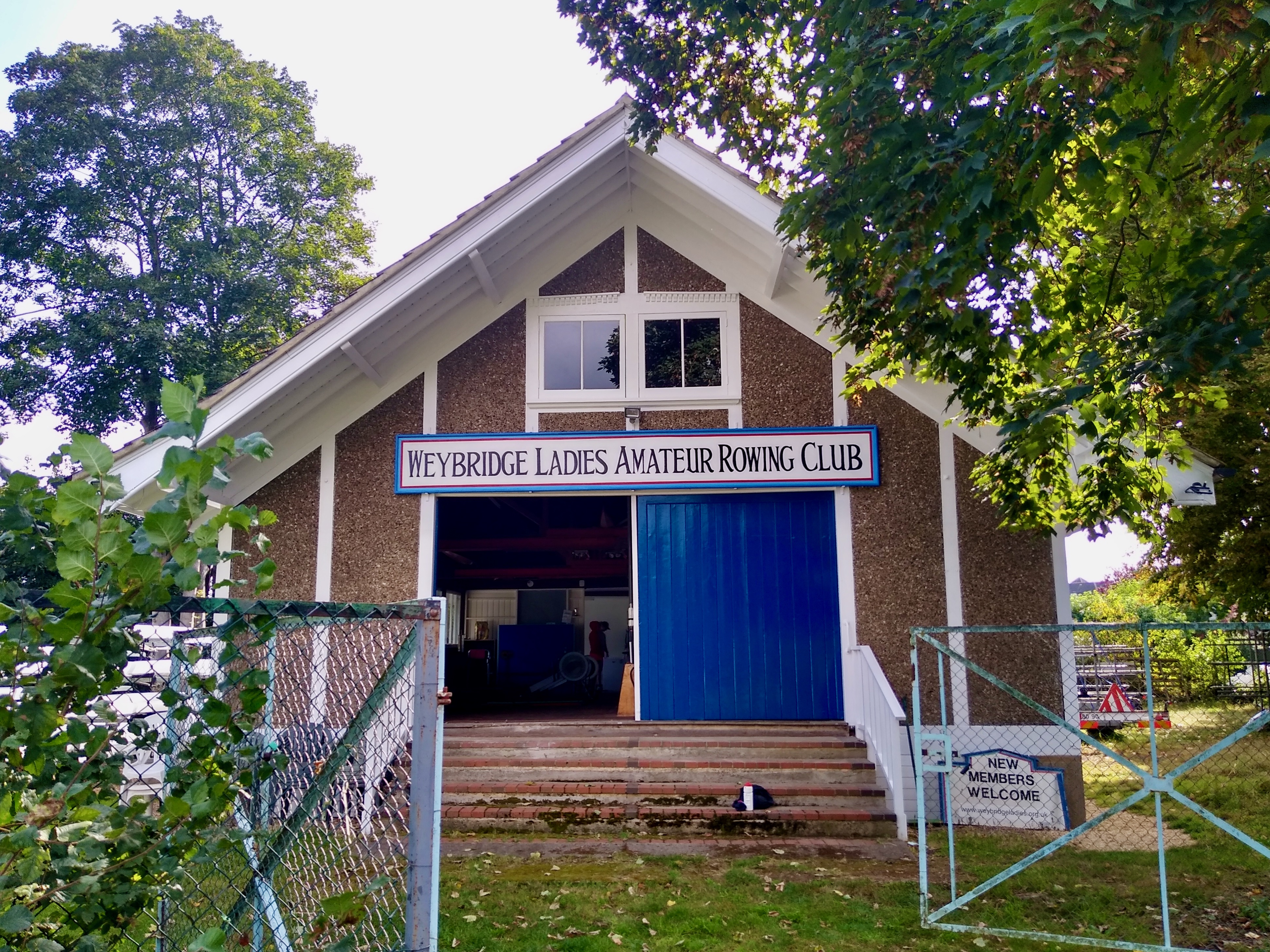
Weybridge Ladies Amateur Rowing Club boathouse

Weybridge Rowing Club was founded in 1881 and moved to its current premises, adjacent to Thames Lock, in 1910. Women were first admitted as members in 1910. Weybridge Ladies Amateur Rowing Club was founded by Amy Gentry in 1926. Weyfarers Rowing Club for recreational rowers was founded in September 2000.

The Weybridge Community Regatta, organised by Weybridge Rowing Club, takes place on the Desborough Cut each summer. The club has hosted the Weybridge Silver Sculls head since 1956. The race takes place on a 3,000 m (3,300 yd) course on the Thames. The Weybridge Veterans' Head is held each year in March and includes events for juniors as well as veterans.

=== Rugby ===
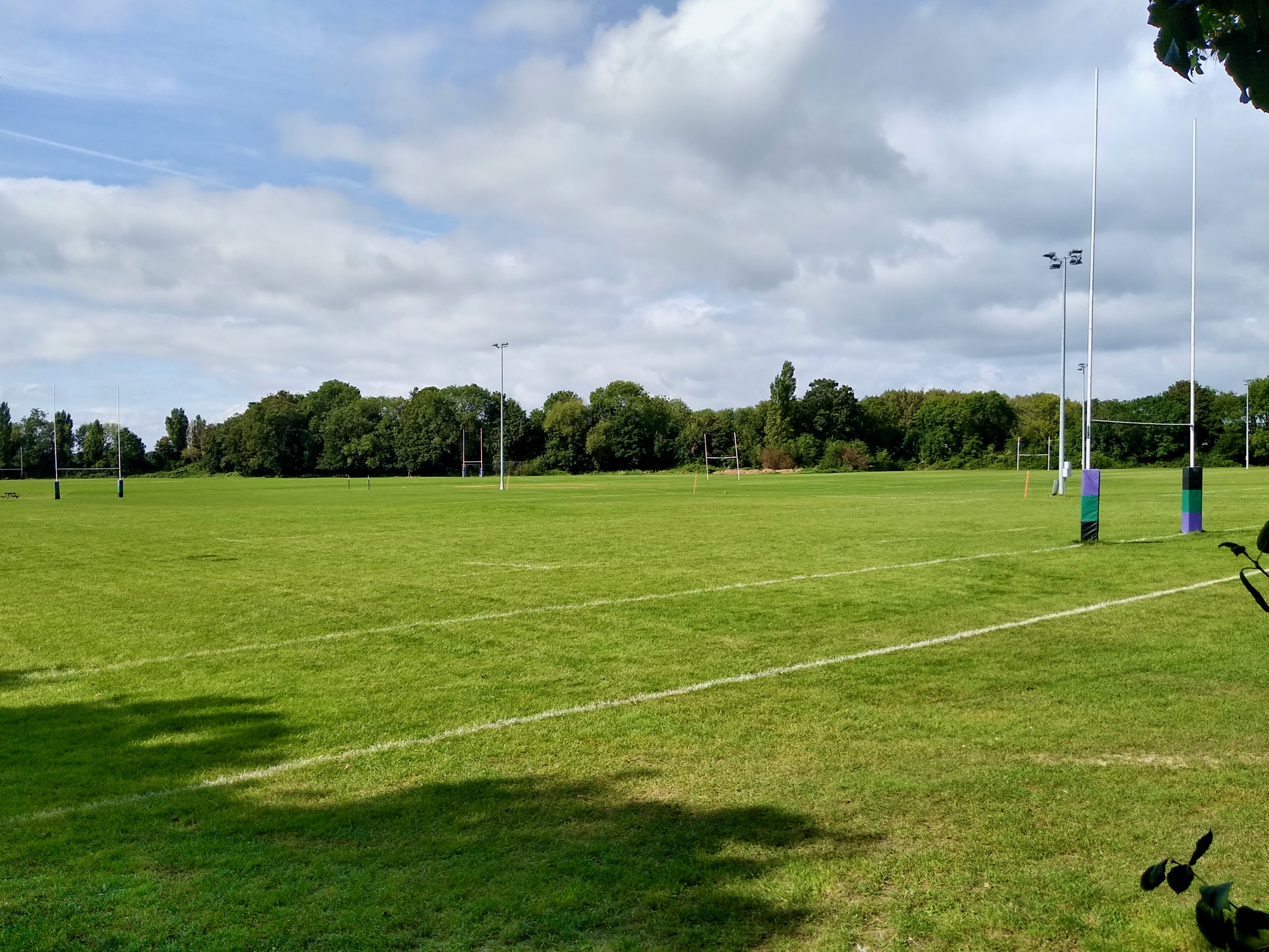
Weybridge Vandals rugby pitches

Weybridge Vandals RFC was founded in 1932 for members of the University of London. It was initially known as "London University Vandals RFC" and played its home matches at Motspur Park. A vulture taking off with wings raised was adopted as the club symbol. The club moved to the premises of a former private zoo on Desborough Island in 1932 and, in 2003, changed its name to Weybridge Vandals RFC to reflect the location of its home ground.

=== Shooting ===
Weybridge Rifle and Pistol Club was opened in 1901. Initially the range was at Brooklands Farm, but relocated in 1906 to allow for the construction of the racing circuit. In 2021, the club has a 100-yard outdoor range for .22 calibre rifles and a 25-yard outdoor air gun range.

=== Tennis ===
St George's Hill Lawn Tennis Club was opened in 1913. It covers 16 acres (6.5 ha) and has 33 courts, of which 13 are grass courts. It also offers four squash courts and facilities for badminton and table tennis.

Weybridge Lawn Tennis Club, in Walton Lane, offers five outdoor courts.

== Tourist attractions ==
=== Brooklands Museum ===
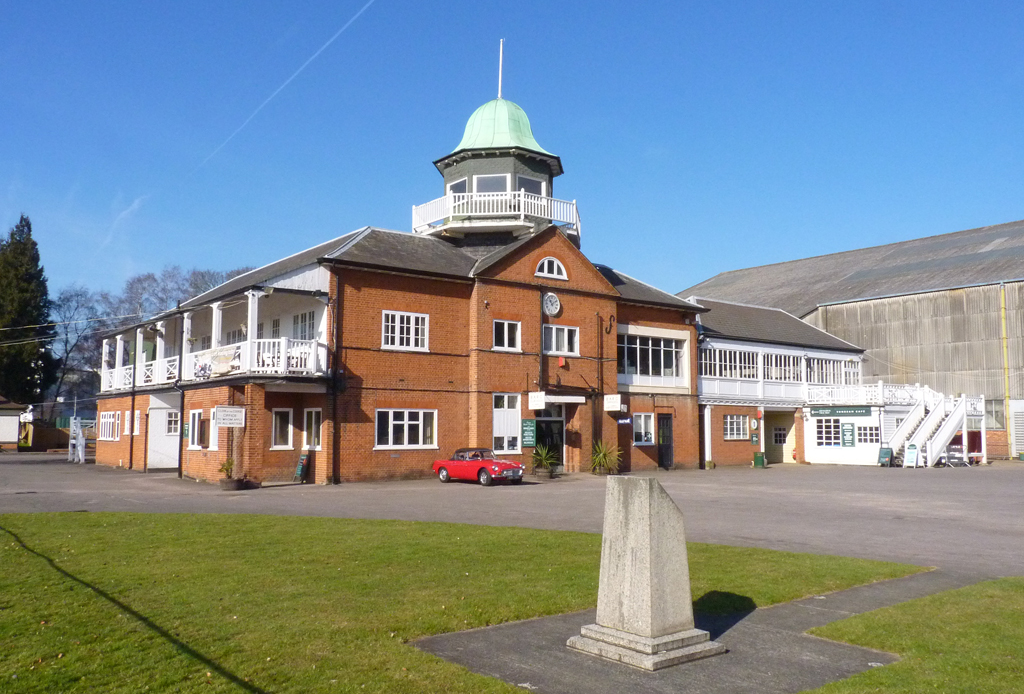
Aero Clubhouse, Brooklands Museum

As aircraft manufacture at Brooklands began to decline in the 1970s, BAC closed the factory buildings on the west side of the runway and the area was redeveloped for light industry, offices and retail units. The corporation also vacated a 40-acre (16 ha) site at the northern end of the former finishing straight, 30 acres of which became the Brooklands Museum. The museum, which opened in 1991, has preserved several historic buildings including the 1911 Ticket Office, the 1932 Aero Clubhouse and a 100 m (110 yd) section of track. A wide range of vintage aircraft, racing cars and motorcycles is on display, including Concorde G-BBDG, a Wellington Bomber (Note: The Wellington Bomber on display at Brooklands Museum ditched in Loch Ness during a training flight in 1940. It was recovered in 1985 and was subsequently restored at Brooklands.) and a 1927 Delage 15-S8 Grand Prix racing car.

=== London Bus Museum ===
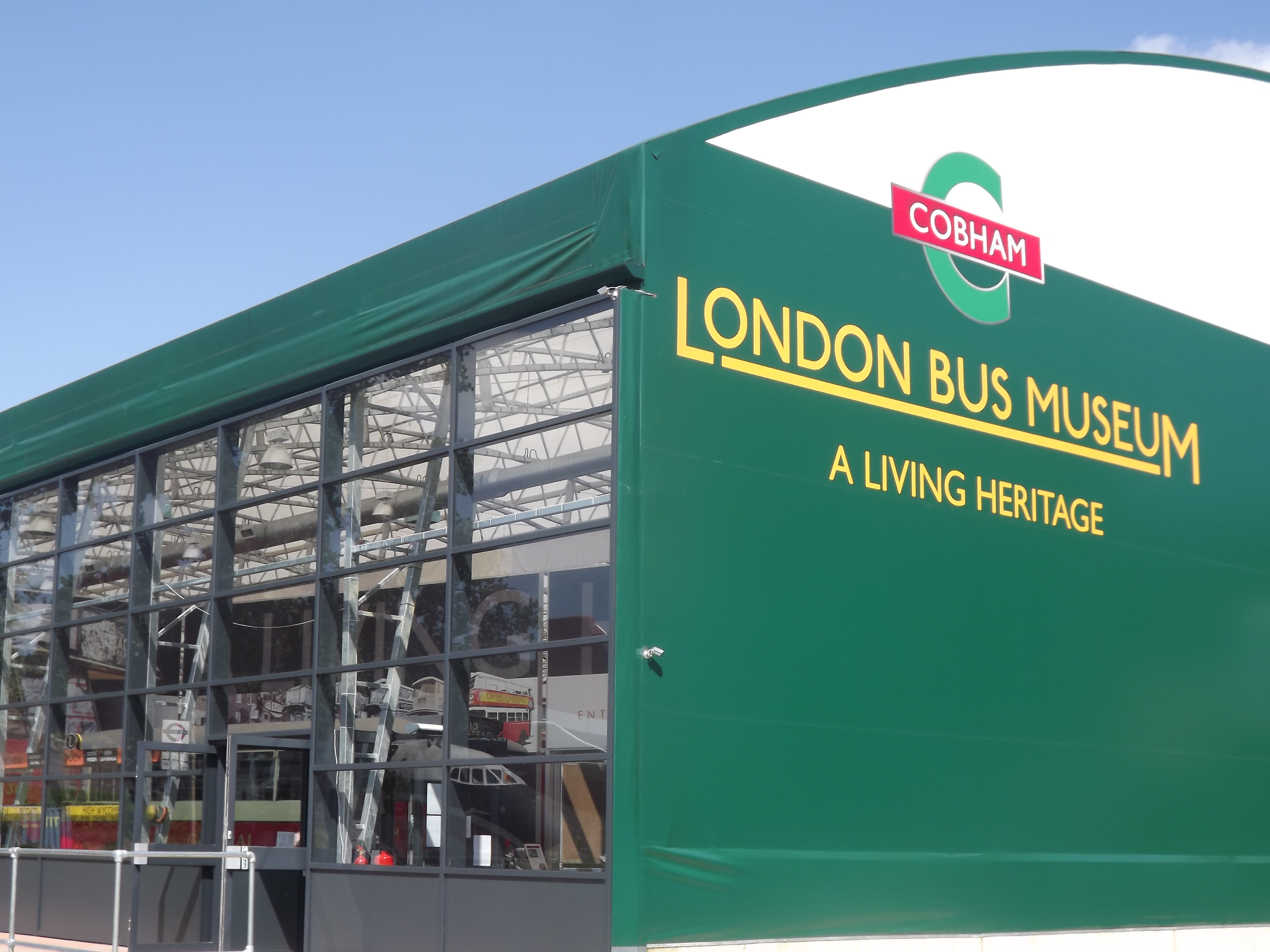
London Bus Museum

The London Bus Museum traces its origins to the mid-1960s, when the London Bus Preservation Group was formed by a number of private heritage vehicle owners. Eight years later, the group purchased a former factory in Cobham, Surrey, which was converted to a museum, opening in 1974. In 2011, the museum moved to a newly constructed building on the Brooklands Museum site. Around 30 buses dating from the 1820s to the 1970s are on public display at any one time, around two thirds of which are owned by the London Bus Preservation Trust and the remainder by private individuals. Entry to the museum is via a combined ticket with the Brooklands Museum.

=== Mercedes-Benz World ===
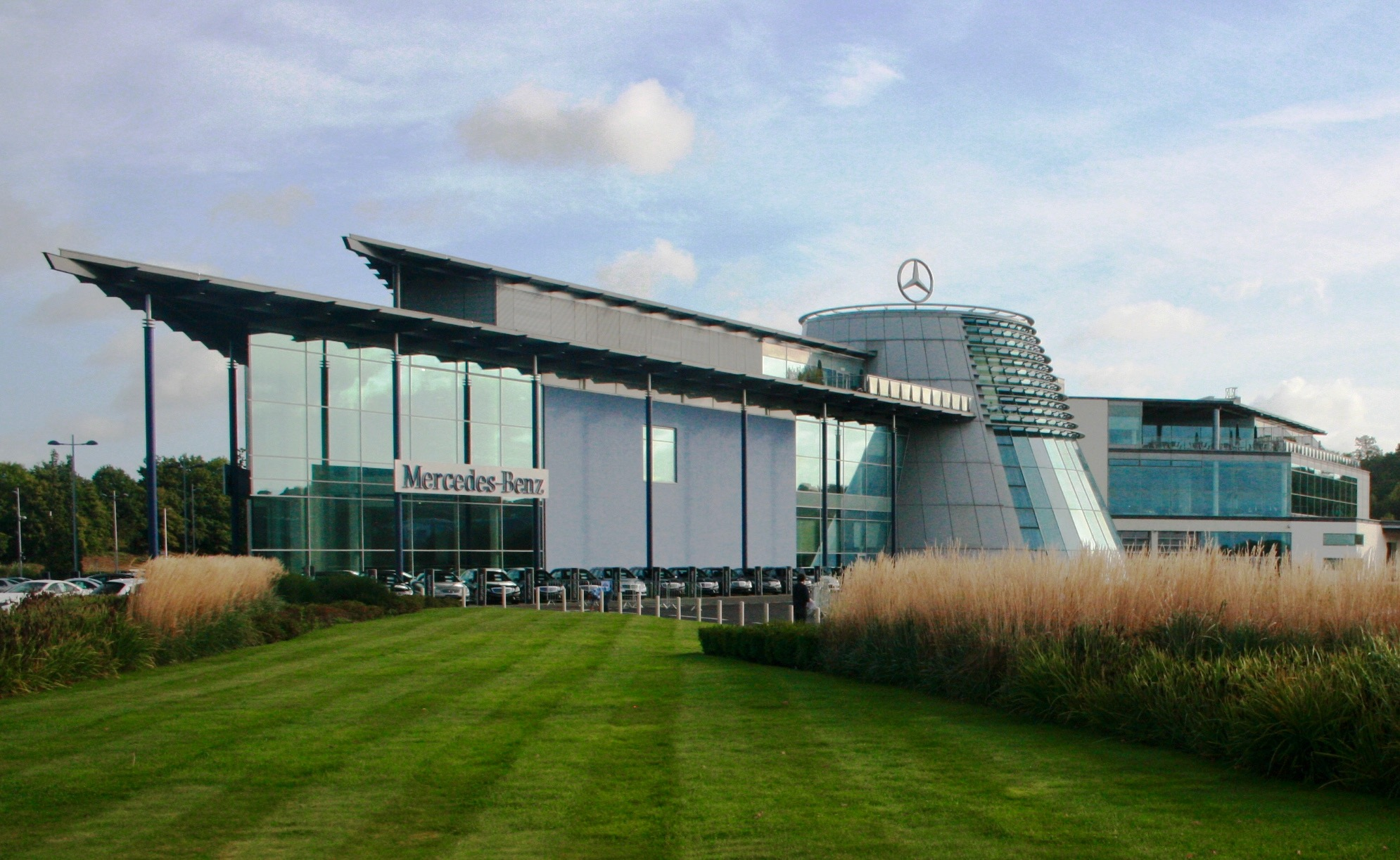
Mercedes-Benz World

The German car manufacturer, Daimler AG, purchased the former Brooklands runway and the adjacent strips of land in 2002. The northern half of the site was redeveloped into a tourist attraction, Mercedes-Benz World, which was opened in October 2006. The southern half was handed to Elmbridge Borough Council and became the Brooklands Community Park. As part of the work to construct the new attraction, the section of the motor racing circuit adjacent to the railway was restored and a new car park and entrance to the Brooklands Museum were provided. Among the exhibits at Mercedes-Benz World are a number of historic racing and road cars and the attraction offers racing simulators and driving experiences.

== Notable buildings and landmarks ==
=== Memorial to Gerrard Winstanley ===
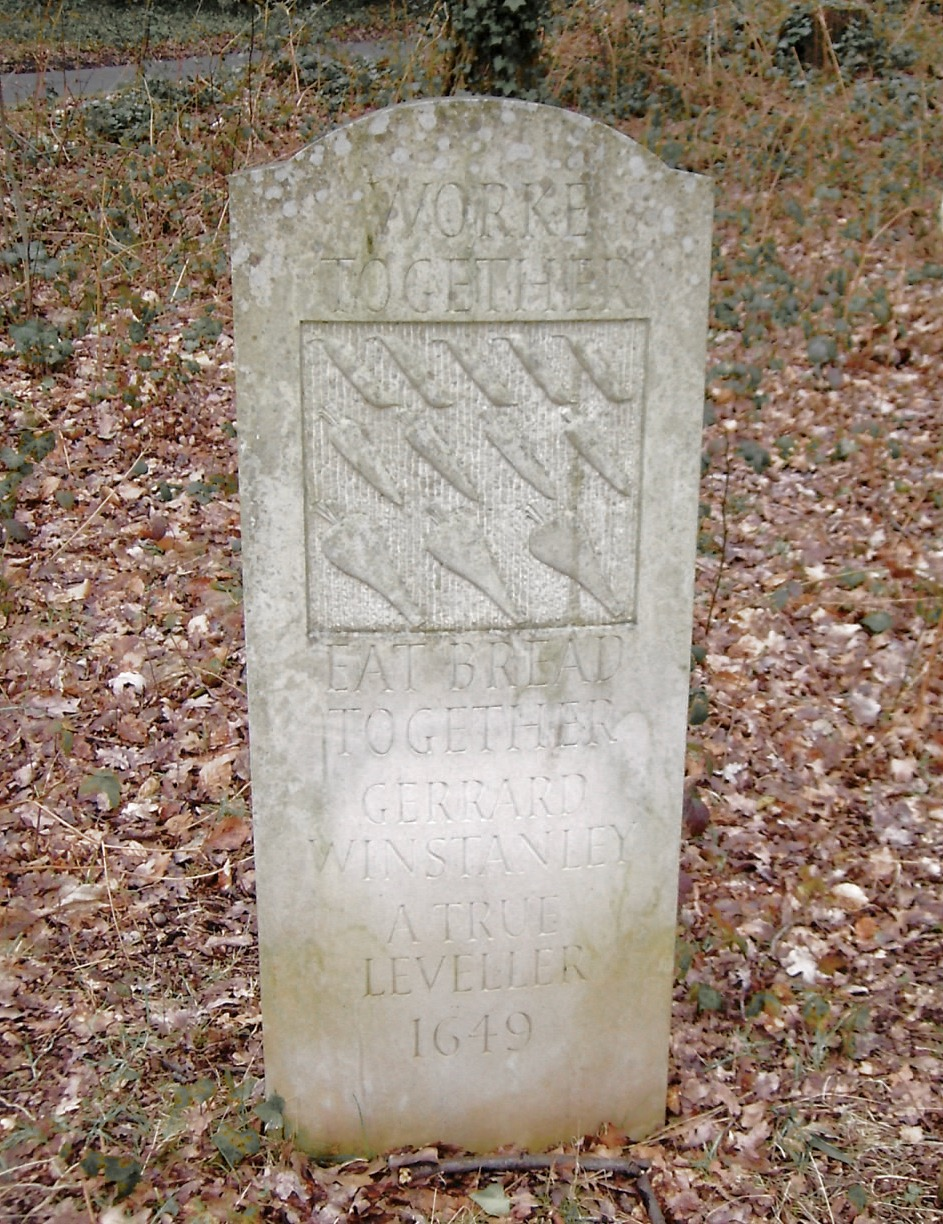
Memorial to Gerrard Winstanley

The memorial to Gerrard Winstanley, located close to the railway station, was unveiled in December 2000. It commemorates the radical leader of the Diggers or True Levellers, a group of 17th-century religious dissidents, who set up an encampment on St George's Hill. The group began to cultivate the common land on the hill in April 1649, encouraging others to join them and declaring their intention to reclaim enclosed land. The group published several pamphlets and their philosophy has been compared to agrarian socialism and modern anarchism. Following harassment from local landowners and threats of legal action, the Diggers relocated to Little Heath, Cobham that August, but had been driven from the land by April 1650.

=== Oatlands Park Hotel ===
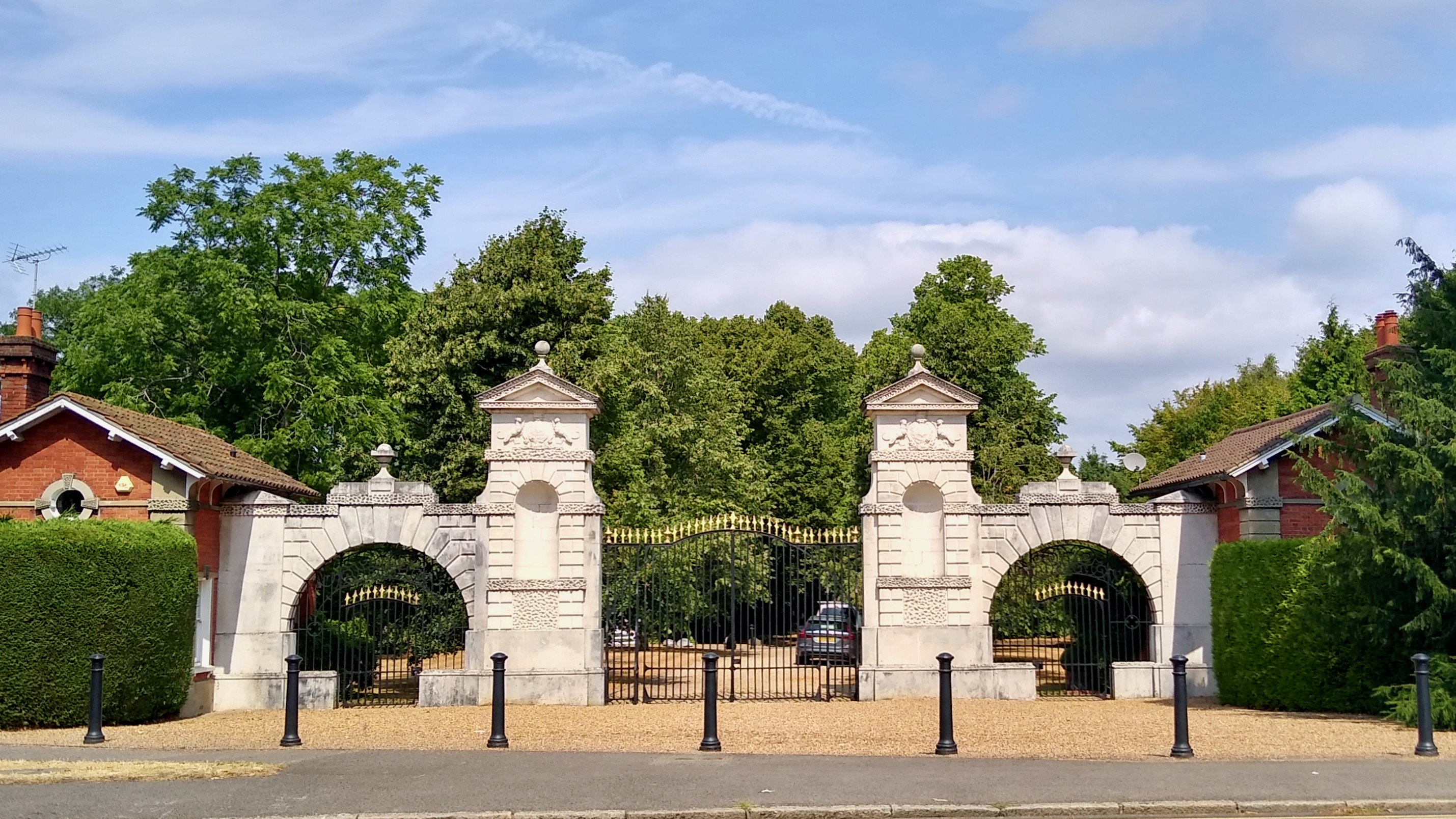
Entrance gates to Oatlands Park Hotel

Following the demolition of Oatlands Palace in the mid-17th century, the surrounding hunting park passed through a series of owners until it was inherited by Henry Clinton, 7th Earl of Lincoln in 1716. Clinton remodelled the estate, creating a new garden in 1725 and constructing a new house to the east of the town centre in 1725. The property was purchased by Prince Frederick, Duke of York and Albany in around 1790. Four years later, much of the house was destroyed by fire and a new mansion, Oatlands Park, was designed by Henry Holland on the same site. It was built in the Italianate style using yellow London stock bricks, but the original entrance gateway, designed in the mid-18th century by William Kent, was retained. (Note: The entrance gates were moved to their current site on Oatlands Drive in around 1858. As part of the relocation process, the Portland stone ashlar plinths were made taller and wrought iron scrollwork was added to the side gates in order to make the entrance appear grander. The red brick lodges are thought to have been built when the gateway was resited.)

The Duke of York sold Oatlands Park to Edward Hughes Ball Hughes in 1824, following the death of his wife four years earlier. Hughes was responsible for remodelling the house in 1827, but financial problems forced him to lease the estate to William Egerton, 1st Baron Egerton a year later. The land was sold in 1846 and, in 1856, Oatlands Park became a hotel, when the west wing was added by the architect, Thomas Henry Wyatt.

The 10 ha (25-acre) Broad Water, also known as Broadwater Lake, is located between the Oatlands Park Hotel and the River Thames. It is shown as a cruciform canal on a 1737 plan of the Oatlands estate by the cartographer, John Roque, and is thought to have been enlarged to its current form by 1770. Today, the 1.2 km-long (0.75 mi) lake runs in a shallow arc from west to north east and is fed by springs close to St George's Junior School. It was constructed as a trompe-l'œil and its east end appears to flow under Walton Bridge, which in fact spans the River Thames. A new footpath along the northern bank of the lake was opened in 2017.

=== Ship Hotel ===
Parts of the Ship Hotel on Monument Green are thought to date from the 16th century. Its original name, the Ship Inn, may derive from "shippin" meaning a cattle shed. In the mid-18th century, the inn was used for meetings of the manorial courts and during the Napoleonic Wars, it served as a recruiting centre for the army.

=== War memorial ===
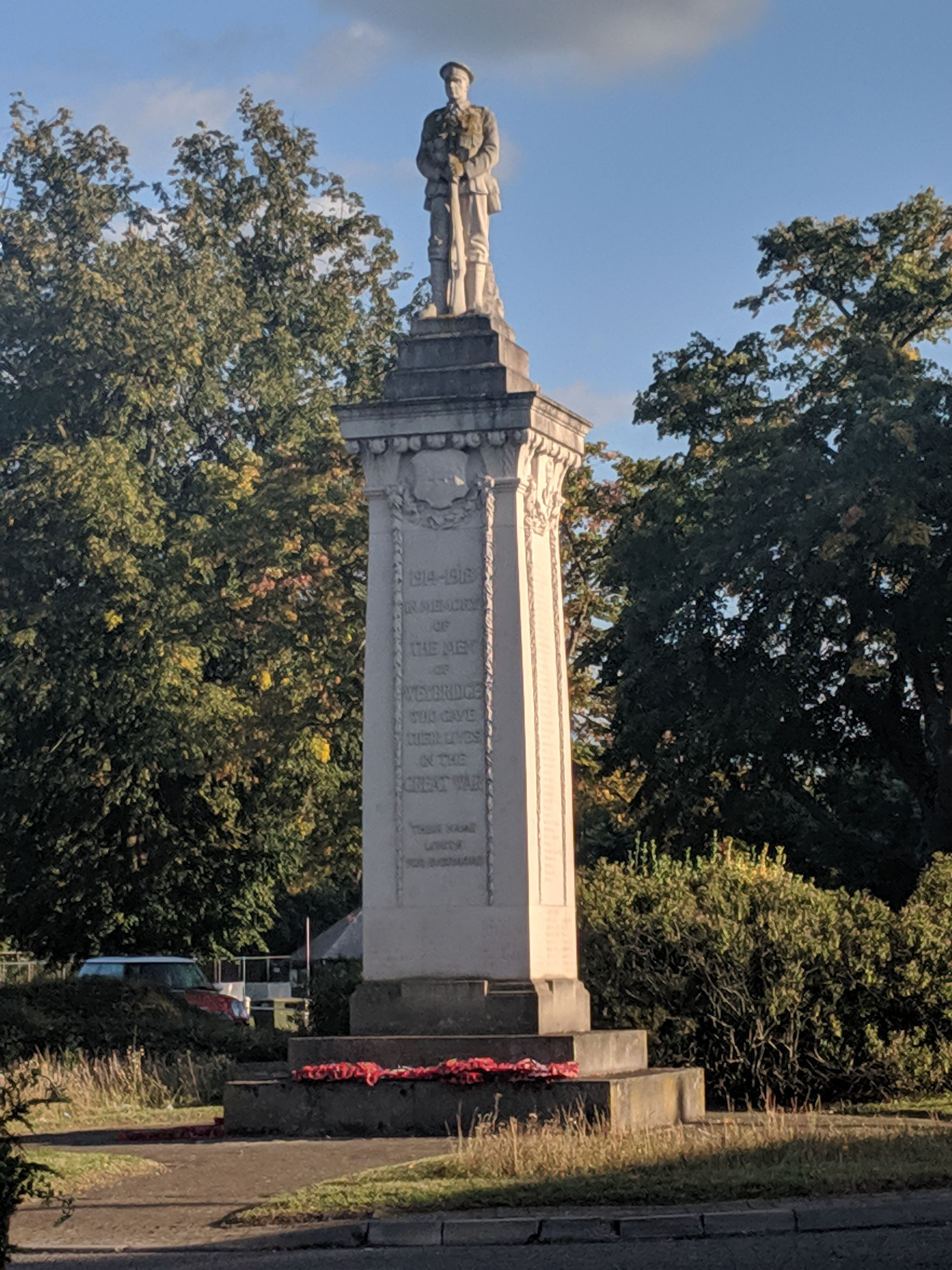
Weybridge War Memorial

The war memorial, designed by J. Hatchard Smith, was erected in 1923 at the south end of Monument Hill. It consists of a square column, on which a statue of a soldier is standing at ease. A total of 224 people who died in the First World War, Second World War and Korean War are commemorated.

=== Yool Memorial ===
The stone drinking fountain at the junction of Hanger Hill and Princes Road was commissioned from the Metropolitan Drinking Fountain and Cattle Trough Association in 1896. It commemorates Henry Yool, a local benefactor and former vice-chairman of Surrey County Council. Originally erected on Weybridge Hill, the memorial was moved to its current location in 1971.

=== York Column ===
The York Column on Monument Green originally stood at Seven Dials in central London. The sundial pillar was commissioned by Thomas Neale in the 1690s to form the centrepiece of his housing development near Covent Garden. The monument was dismantled in 1777 and the stones were purchased by the architect, James Paine, who lived in Addlestone. In 1822 the column was erected on Monument Green in Weybridge as a memorial to the Duchess of York, who had lived at Oatlands House and who had died two years previously. The badly weathered dialstone was not reinstalled on the monument and can be seen adjacent to Weybridge Library.

== Parks and open spaces ==
=== Brooklands Community Park ===
The 24 ha (59-acre) Brooklands Community Park was opened in 2006 on land donated by Daimler AG to Elmbridge Borough Council. The formal recreation areas, which include a children's playground, multi-use games area, skatepark and an off-road cycle course, total approximately 2 ha (4.9 acres). The remainder of the park is naturalised dry-acid grassland, which provides a habitat for plants including hoary cinquefoil and yellow rattle, as well as butterfly species such as the small copper and common blue. Brooklands Parkrun takes place at the Community Park on Saturday mornings.

=== Churchfields recreation ground ===
Churchfields recreation ground was opened by Weybridge Council in 1908, on land donated by John Lyle. (Note: John Lyle was the son of sugar trader Abram Lyle.)

=== Monument Green ===
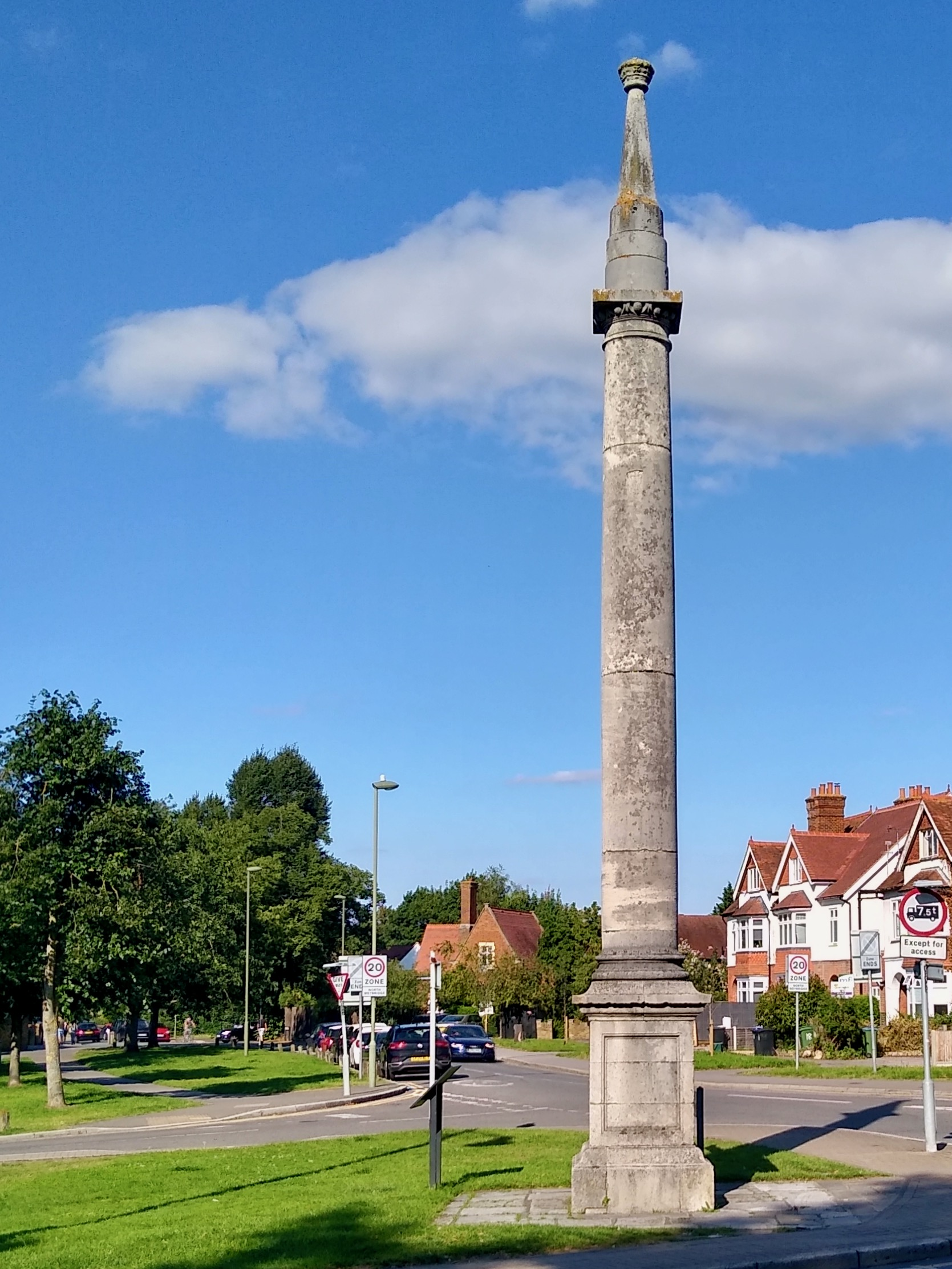
The York Column on Monument Green

Monument Green is an area of common land at the north end of the High Street, surrounding the junction between Thames Street and Monument Hill. In the 18th century, it was known as the "Bull Ring" and bull-baiting is thought to have taken place there. In the early 19th century, the village pump was located on the western side, in front of the Ship Hotel. The York Column was erected in the centre of the green in 1822. Most of the houses in the surrounding area were constructed in the late 19th and early 20th centuries.

=== Weybridge Heath ===
Weybridge Heath, to the south of the town centre, was reserved for the use of local residents under the Inclosure Act 1800. Some 16.6 ha (41 acres) are owned by Elmbridge Borough Council.

=== Whittet's Ait ===
Whittet's Ait is an island between the River Wey and River Wey Navigation in the north of Weybridge. It is named after the owner of the former oil seed mill, which was sited next to Thames Lock. Elmbridge Borough Council acquired the publicly accessible open land on the ait in 2000, to protect it for recreational use.

== Notable residents ==
- Thomas Hopsonn (1643–1717) – Vice-admiral, moved to Weybridge in 1702. He built Vigo House and is buried in St James' Church. (Note: Vigo House was named after the 1702 Battle of Vigo Bay, part of the War of the Spanish Succession. Hopsonn led a successful attack on the French fleet and was knighted on his return to Britain. Vigo House was demolished in the 1920s to make way for the relocation of Weybridge Hospital.)
- David Colyear, 1st Earl of Portmore (c. 1656-1730) – army officer and Governor of Gibraltar, lived at Portmore Park
- Fanny Kemble (1809–1893) – author, actor and anti-slavery campaigner, lived at Eastlands, Brooklands Road
- Benjamin Scott (1814–1892) – Chamberlain of the City of London, lived at Heath House (now named Lorimar House), founded the Congregational chapel (now Weybridge United Reformed Church)
- George Fergusson Wilson (1822–1902) – industrial chemist, lived at Weybridge from 1863 until his death
- Lionel Smith Beale (1828–1906) – physician and microscopist, lived in Weybridge from 1885 to 1904
- Elizabeth Dawes (1864–1954) – classical scholar and teacher, lived and taught in Weybridge from 1889 until her death
- George May, 1st Baron May (1871–1946) – financial expert and civil servant, lived at Eyot House
- Madge Syers (1881-1917) - figure skater, retired to Weybridge where she died
- Frank Finlay (1926–2016) – actor, lived at Weybridge at time of his death.
- Colin Davis (1927–2013) – conductor, was born in the town.
- Bernard Cribbins (1928-2022) - actor, lived in Weybridge latter half of his life.
- John Fozard (1928–1996) – aeronautical engineer and designer of the Hawker Siddeley Harrier, lived at St George's Hill
- John Lennon (1940–1980) – musician, lived at Kenwood, St George's Hill from 1964 to 1968
- Cliff Richard (b. 1940) - singer, had his main home for some years in Weybridge, which he shared with his manager Bill Latham and the latter's mother.
- Ringo Starr (b. 1940) – musician, lived at St George's Hill from 1965 to 1968
- Mike Yarwood (1941–2023) - impressionist, lived at Weybridge when retired in 2007.
- Jacqueline Bisset (b. 1944) - actress, born at Weybridge
- Gilbert O'Sullivan (b. 1946) - singer-songwriter, lived at Weybridge in 1973
- Theo Paphitis (b. 1959) – businessman, entrepreneur and TV personality
- Bernie Nolan (1960–2013) – singer of group The Nolans and actress, lived in Weybridge.

== See also ==
- Grade II* listed buildings in Elmbridge
- Geology of Surrey

== Bibliography ==
- Anonymous (1912). The Official Guide to Weybridge (PDF). Cheltenham: Ed. J. Burrow & Co. Archived (PDF) from the original on 22 October 2020.
- Anonymous (1983). A Brief History of Oatlands Village. Weybridge: Weybridge & Walton Local History Society.
- Archer Stonebanks, John (1980). The Thames at Walton and Weybridge. Weybridge: Walton & Weybridge Local History Society.
- Barker, D.M.; Barker, J.L. (1993). A window on Weybridge. Addlestone: Ian Allan. ISBN 0-95-186583-8.
- Barton, Morag, ed. (1985). Brooklands. Weybridge: Brooklands Museum.
- Blyth, Alan (1972). Colin Davis. London: Ian Allan. OCLC 675416.
- Bradley, E.N. (1979). A short history of Weybridge Hospital. Weybridge: Friends of Weybridge Hospital.
- Brayley, John; Britton, John (1841). A topographical history of Surrey. Vol. 2. Dorking: Robert Best Ede.
- Burton, Nigel (2011). Weybridge Rowing Club: 1880s to 1990s. Thatcham: Dolman Scott Ltd. ISBN 978-1-90-555385-3.
- Campbell, Heather M, ed. (2009). The Britannica Guide to Political Science and Social Movements That Changed the Modern World. New York: The Rosen Publishing Group. ISBN 978-1-61-530062-4.
- Cleal, Edward E.; Crippen, T. G. (1908). The Story of Congregationalism in Surrey. London: James Clarke & Co.
- Cole, Henry (1847). Felix Summerly's pleasure excursions: Walton and Weybridge on the South-Western Railway. Railway Chronicle Office.
- Crocker, Glenys (1999). Surrey's Industrial Past (PDF). Guildford: Surrey Industrial History Group. ISBN 978-0-95-239188-3. Archived (PDF) from the original on 9 August 2020.
- Crook, Paul (2000). Surrey Home Guard. Midhurst: Middleton Press. ISBN 1-901-70657-5.
- Dewey, Henry; Bromehead, C. E. N. (1915). The Geology of the Country around Windsor and Chertsey. London: British Geological Survey. Archived from the original on 6 September 2021.
- Douglas Smith, John (2003). Weybridge Station. Weybridge Station: Walton & Weybridge Local History Society.
- Fisher, Stuart (2013). British River Navigations. London: Adlard Coles Nautical. ISBN 978-1-47-290084-5.
- Gover, J.E.B; Mawer, A.; Stenton, F.M. (1969). The place-names of Surrey. Cambridge: Cambridge University Press.
- Greenwood, G.B., ed. (1983). Walton-on-Thames and Weybridge: A dictionary of local History (4th ed.). Weybridge: Walton & Weybridge Local History Society.
- Hadfield, Charles (1969). The canals of south and south east England. Newton Abbott: David & Charles. ISBN 978-0-71-534693-8.
- Jackson, Robert (2007). Britain's Greatest Aircraft. Barnsley: Pen and Sword. ISBN 978-1-84415-600-9.
- John, Richard (2010). Robert Adam: The search for a modern classicism. Mulgrave: Images Publishing. ISBN 978-1-92-074454-0.
- Johnson, Howard (1981). Wings over Brooklands: The Story of the Birthplace of British Aviation. London: Whittet Books. ISBN 0-905483-40-5.
- Kempster, Helen (1997). The history of St James' Church, Weybridge. Weybridge: St James' Church.
- Knowles, Gordon (2005). Surrey and the Motor. Guildford: Surrey Industrial History Group. ISBN 0-9538122-3-5.
- Kümin, Beat A (1996). The shaping of a community : the rise and reformation of the English parish, c. 1400-1560. Aldershot: Scholar. ISBN 978-1-85-928164-2.
- Lansdell, H.W. (1970). The home fires burning: Weybridge Volunteer Brigade. Weybridge: Walton & Weybridge Local History Society.
- Malden, H.E., ed. (1911). A History of the County of Surrey. Vol. 3. London: Victoria County History. Archived from the original on 28 January 2021.
- Middleton-Stewart, Geraldine (2001). Surrey Police: A pictorial history 1851-2001. Guildford: Surrey Police.
- Mitchell, Vic; Smith, Keith (1986). Waterloo to Woking. Midhurst: Middleton Press. ISBN 0-906520-38-X.
- Mitchell, Vic; Smith, Keith (1989). Branch lines around Ascot. Midhurst: Middleton Press. ISBN 0-906520-64-9.
- Nairn, Ian; Pevsner, Nikolaus (1971) [1962]. The Buildings of England: Surrey (2nd ed.). Harmondsworth: Penguin Books. ISBN 0-300-09675-5.
- Rushdie, Salman (1989). The Satanic Verses. New York: Viking. ISBN 978-0-67-082537-0.
- Swenarton, Mavis (2001). The history of St George's Hill. Weybridge: Walton & Weybridge Local History Society.
- Tarplee, Peter (1998). A Guide to the Industrial History of the Borough of Elmbridge. Guildford: Surrey Industrial History Group. ISBN 978-0-95-239186-9.
- Thacker, Fred S. (1914). The Thames Highway. Vol. I: General History. London: Dyer’s Buildings.
- Thacker, Fred S. (1920). The Thames Highway. Vol. II: Locks and Weirs. London: Dyer’s Buildings.
- Venables, David (2007). Brooklands: The official centenary history. Yeovil: Haynes Publishing. ISBN 978-1-84-425329-6.
- Vine, P.A.L. (1996). London's lost route to the sea: An historical account of the inland navigations which linked the Thames to the English Channel (5th ed.). Midhurst: Middleton Press. ISBN 1-873793-782.
- Wells, H.G. (1898). War of the Worlds. New York and London: Harper & Brothers. Archived from the original on 18 July 2021.
- Watson, Nigel (2008). The Family Album: A Portrait of St George's College Weybridge. Third Millennium. ISBN 978-1-90-394294-9.
- White, Neil (1999). Weybridge Past. Chichester: Phillimore. ISBN 1-86077-086-X.
- Wyndham, John (2008) [1953]. The Kraken Wakes. London: Penguin. ISBN 978-0-14-103299-3.
