= Weybridge United Reformed Church =

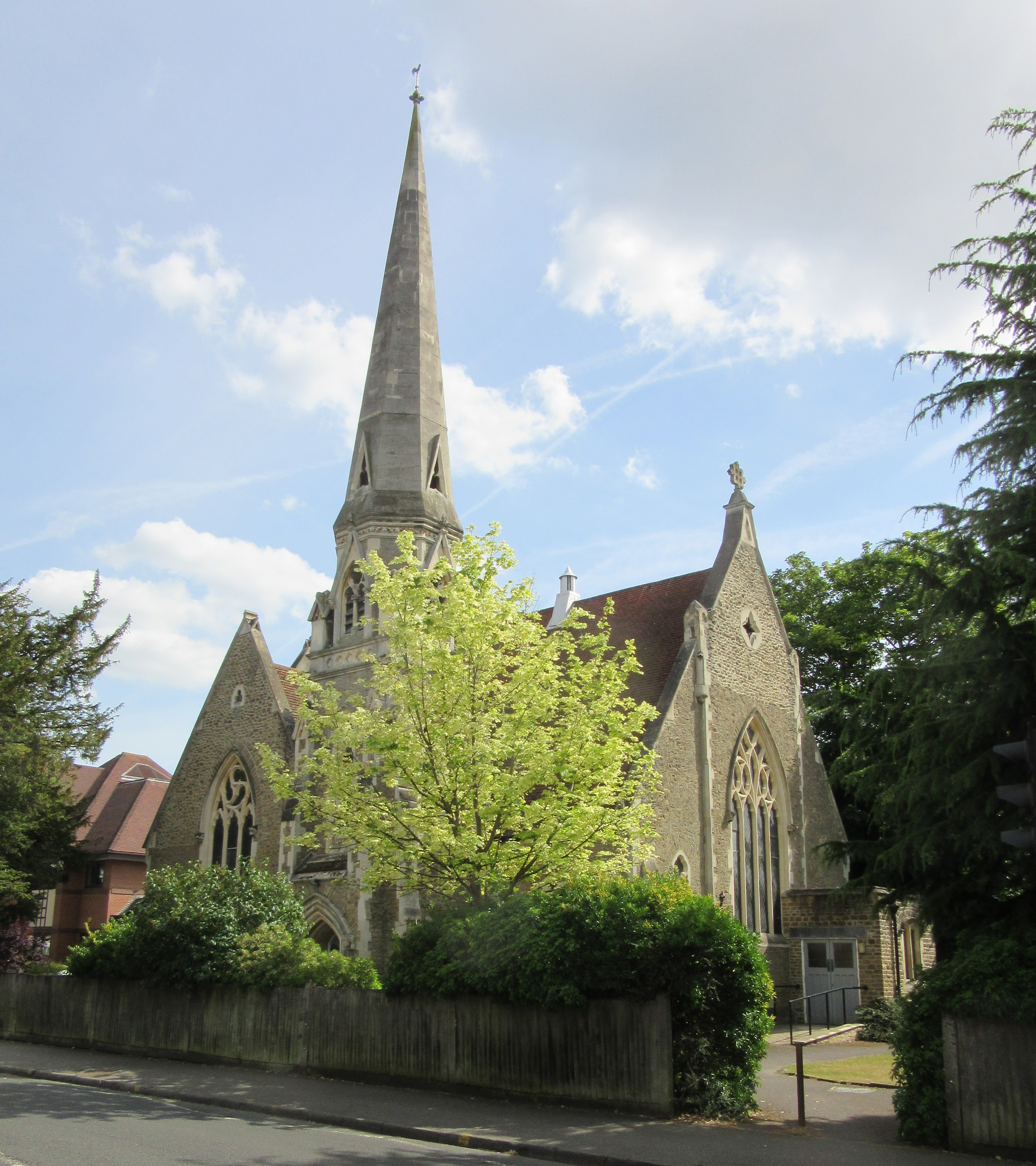
- The church from the northwest

- Location within Surrey
- 51°22′05″N 00°26′47″W
- OS grid reference: TQ 08244 64369
- Location: Queens Road, Weybridge, Surrey KT13 9UX
- Country: England
- Denomination: United Reformed Church
- Previous denomination: Congregational
- Website: https://stjohnsmtc.org.uk//

History
- Status: Church
- Founded: 4 July 1864
- Founder(s): Benjamin Scott, François Baron

Architecture
- Functional status: Opened 2026( Worship place for St Johns Mar Thoma church). Previously Closed 2022 on merger of URC Weybridge with URC Walton-on-Thames congregation
- Heritage designation: Grade II
- Designated: 24 October 1974
- Architect: John Tarring
- Style: Decorated Gothic Revival
- Groundbreaking: 4 July 1864
- Completed: 17 May 1865
- Construction cost: £2,100

Specifications
- Capacity: 350
- Materials: Rubble, ashlar

The Weybridge United Reformed Church (formerly Weybridge Congregational Church) situated at Queen's Road (the A 317 Road), Weybridge, near to its junction with York Road, is a Victorian Grade II Listed church building (or former church building) that is now used by the St.John's Mar Thoma church congregation, formerly being unused for worship.

It was the United Reformed church serving the town of Weybridge in the English county of Surrey, until 2022. In 2022, the Weybridge congregation of the United Reformed Church merged with the Walton-on-Thames congregation of the United Reformed Church (formerly the St Andrew's Presbyterian Church), thereby forming a single United Reformed Church in Walton and Weybride. The merged congregation now worships in the St Andrew's buildings at Hersham Road, Walton-on-Thames, a distance of 2.2 miles from the Weybridge building. The merged congregation has adopted the name St Andrew's United Reformed Church Walton and Weybridge.

The Decorated Gothic Revival church at Queen's Road, Weybridge, a cruciform building with a tall spire, was designed in 1864 by John Tarring and opened the following year. Congregational services had commenced in the town in 1860 at the initiative of resident Benjamin Scott; the rapidly rising number of worshippers outgrew the rooms in which meetings were held, and Scott himself bought the land on which the church now stands and helped to finance its construction. The Weybridge Congregational Church and the Walton (St Andrew's) Presbyterian Church both joined the United Reformed Church denomination upon its formation in 1972, but for almost fifty years they remained as two distinct local churches within the wider United Reformed Church, until their merger in 2022. Historic England has listed the Weybridage building at Grade II for its architectural and historical importance.

== History ==
The first Congregational church in this part of Surrey was founded in Hersham in 1843, and a chapel was completed the following year. Reverend A.E. Lord, its first minister, was ordained in the same year and served at Hersham until 1881. He also travelled to other parts of Surrey to preach, and in 1855 he conducted services for several weeks in a hired cottage in Weybridge. He was forced to leave these premises, though, and the cause faltered.

Five years later the Chamberlain of the City of London, Benjamin Scott moved to Weybridge. He started to hold open-air meetings of a Nonconformist character in the town on Sunday evenings, when no services were held in the town's Church of England parish church. "Much interest was excited" in this work, and a local resident allowed the billiard-room of his house to be converted into a meeting room which could be used for Congregational services on evenings during the week. These continued until 1862. Scott then modified a room in his own house and converted it into a meeting place for services on Sunday evenings, which began in January 1863 under his leadership; these in turn became so popular that a larger room capable of holding 200 worshippers was used from April of that year. Scott also became the first chairman of the Surrey Congregational Union, which administered and looked after Congregational churches throughout the county; its first meeting was held at his home in June 1863.

By 1864, when a Sunday school was formed, it was decided that a permanent church should be built. François Baron, a convert to Congregationalism who had been active in Sunday school work and lecturing for about 20 years, had moved to Weybridge in 1863 and together with Scott was involved in the founding of the new church. Scott bought land on Queens Road, (Note: At the junction of York Road, which was given as the street address when the church was registered for marriages.) and the foundation stone was laid on 4 July 1864 by John Remington Mills. The architect John Tarring was commissioned to design the church, which was completed the following year. The first service was held on 17 May 1865, and Baron was ordained the same day and became the first minister of Weybridge Congregational Church. Construction of the church, which had a capacity of 350 worshippers, cost £2,100 (equivalent to £231,000 in 2025). Benjamin Scott contributed £500 and donated the organ, valued at £400.

A school building was opened in 1871, followed by a church hall in the Oatlands area in 1891. Baron moved to the Congregational church in Mortlake in 1890, where he ministered until his death in August 1899. Another minister was elected immediately. For several years at the end of the 19th century, the Congregational church at Cobham was administered from Weybridge. The same arrangement was made for the chapel at Byfleet between its opening in 1902 and the appointment of a minister covering both churches two years later.

The church itself was altered in 1886 with the addition of a gallery, and in 1965 (to commemorate the 100th anniversary) by substantially altering the interior layout. A new pulpit was built, a lectern was added and the organ case was moved.

Weybridge United Reformed Church took this name in 1972 when it became part of the newly formed denomination along with most Congregational churches in England and Wales and the Presbyterian Church of England. Other denominations have since joined. There are approximately 1,500 United Reformed congregations in the United Kingdom.

== Architecture and heritage ==
Weybridge United Reformed Church was built in the Decorated Gothic Revival ("14th-century") style. It is cruciform in layout and has a centrally placed tower topped with a spire. The main material is rubble masonry dressed with ashlar; the roof, which has a steep pitch, is laid with tiles. The tower is square on its lower stage but has a hexagonal bell-stage below the spire, which is also hexagonal. There is a three/four-bay nave to the west and a chancel to the east; the north and south sides of the church have transepts. The windows are lancets. Architectural historian Nikolaus Pevsner described the appearance of the building as "ferocious".

Memorials to several important figures in the life of the church are placed around the interior. Benjamin Scott is commemorated by a brass plaque, and François Baron's memorial is next to the main entrance. Samuel Woods, who along with Scott was one of the church's first deacons, has a memorial in the south transept. Other deacons, organists and members of the church are represented by memorial plaques and other fixtures. There are also several carved heads inside and on the exterior: three are known to represent John Greenwood, Henry Barrowe and John Penry, three martyrs who were executed in 1593.

Under the name United Reform Church, Weybridge United Reformed Church was listed at Grade II on 24 October 1974. Such buildings are defined as "nationally important and of special interest". As of February 2001, it was one of 462 Grade II listed buildings, with 28 at the two rarer, higher grades, in its Borough (District).

== Administration ==
Weybridge United Reformed Church is registered for worship under the Places of Worship Registration Act 1855. (Note: Its number on the register is 16826. The church also had two halls which were separately registered for worship between 1935 and 1986.) Under the name Weybridge Congregational Chapel it was registered for the solemnisation of marriages in accordance with the Marriage Act 1836 on 14 September 1866. It belongs to the Wessex Synod of its church, one of the denomination's 13 regional associations, which contains about 120 churches: those in Berkshire, Buckinghamshire, Dorset, Hampshire, Oxfordshire, Surrey, Wiltshire, the Isle of Wight and the Channel Islands.

A service was held at 10.30am every Sunday. Church services of the merged church are now held at Queen's Road, Walton at 10.30 am each Sunday. The Queen's Road church at Weybridge supported Guide and Scout groups and other associated groups.

== Merger with the Walton-on-Thames Congregation ==
On 1 January 2022, the Walton-on-Thames congregation (Presbyterian until 1972, but United Reformed from 1972 onwards) and the Weybridge congregation (Congregational until 1972, but United reformed form 1972 onwards) merged to form a single United Reformed Church in Walton and Weybridge.

A final Act of Worship was held in the Queen's Road, Weybridge building during August 2022 and thereafter the congregation meets only at the premises in Hersham Road, Walton-on-Thames.

On 26 June 2026, the St Johns Mar Thoma church purchased the premises from the URC.

== See also ==
- List of places of worship in Elmbridge

== Bibliography ==
- Cleal, Edward E.; Crippen, T. G. (1908). The story of Congregationalism in Surrey. London: James Clarke & Co.
- Nairn, Ian; Pevsner, Nikolaus (1971) [1962]. The Buildings of England: Surrey (2nd ed.). Harmondsworth: Penguin Books. ISBN 0-300-09675-5.
- Stell, Christopher (2002). Nonconformist Chapels and Meeting-houses in Eastern England. Swindon: English Heritage. ISBN 1-873592-50-7.
