= Festival Theatre =

Festival Theatre may refer to:

- Baltic House Festival Theatre, Russia
- Chichester Festival Theatre, UK
- Pitlochry Festival Theatre, UK
- Edinburgh Festival Theatre, UK
- Festival Theatre, Malvern, UK
- Festival Theatre, Paignton, UK
- Festival Theatre, Stratford, Canada
- Festival Theaterformen, Germany
- Festival Theatre, part of the Adelaide Festival Centre, South Australia
