= Paignton =

Seaside town in Devon, England

Coordinates: 50°26′7″N 3°33′45″W

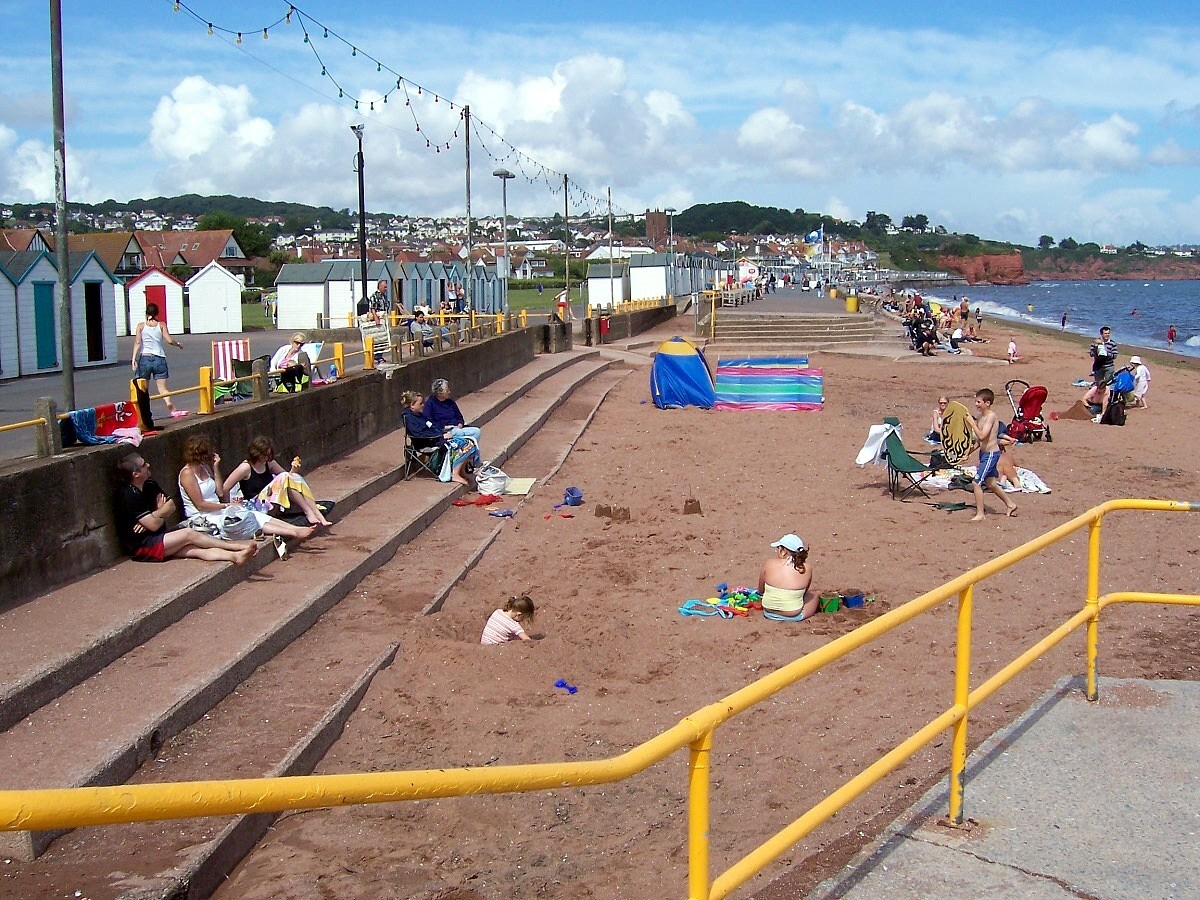
- View along Preston Sands beach

- Location within Devon
- Population: 67,520 (Built up area, 2021)
- OS grid reference: SX8960
- Unitary authority: Torbay
- Ceremonial county: Devon
- Region: South West
- Country: England
- Sovereign state: United Kingdom
- Post town: PAIGNTON
- Postcode district: TQ3, TQ4
- Dialling code: 01803
- Police: Devon and Cornwall
- Fire: Devon and Somerset
- Ambulance: South Western
- UK Parliament: Torbay South Devon

Paignton (/ˈpeɪntən/ PAYN-tən) is a seaside town on the coast of Tor Bay in Devon, England. Together with Torquay and Brixham it forms the borough of Torbay, which was created in 1968. The Torbay area is a holiday destination known as the English Riviera. Paignton has origins as a Celtic settlement and was first mentioned in 1086. It grew as a small fishing village and a new harbour was built in 1847. A railway line was opened to passengers in 1859, creating links to Torquay and London. As its population increased it merged with the villages of Goodrington and Preston. Paignton is around 25 miles (40 km) north east of Plymouth and 20 miles (32 km) south of Exeter.

== History ==
A Roman burial was discovered in 1993 on the Hookhills estate by a householder digging a patio. At first thought to be Neolithic, it was later radiocarbon dated to be between 230 and 390 CE. The burial is of a young woman aged between 15 and 25 years. The burial included oysters and her teeth and bone reveal a diet rich in carbohydrates and proteins. Despite living near the sea marine food accounted for only 10% of her diet. The skeleton is the most complete yet found in Devon and is on display in the Torquay Museum.

Paignton is mentioned in Domesday Book of 1086 as Peintone in the ancient hundred of Kerswell. Formerly written Peynton, Payngton and Paington, the name is derived from Pæga, an Anglo-Saxon personal name, -ing meaning "the people of" and tun an enclosure, estate or homestead, the original Anglo-Saxon settlement. Originally the beach was backed by low sand dunes with marshes behind on the flat land between the sea and the hills behind. The settlement grew up on the dry ground at the foot of the hills, as did a separate hamlet in the shelter of Roundham Head, which was a fishing settlement. The first church was probably built using wood in the eighth century.

In late Saxon times the manor was owned by Leofric, the Bishop of Exeter. Later bishops built the Bishop's Palace adjoining the parish church, some remains of which, including the Coverdale Tower, are still standing. Winner Street owes its name to a corruption of the word Wynerde, referring to vineyards or at least to traders in wine in the medieval period. The bishops secured a charter from Edward I in 1294 giving the right to hold a weekly market and an annual fair, making Paignton a market town. The market declined following the English Reformation in the 16th century.

Paignton then remained a small fishing and farming village (noted for grapes, cabbages and cider) until the 19th century, when in 1837 the Paington Harbour Act led to the construction of a new harbour. Around the same time the modern spelling, Paignton, first appeared. The historic part of Paignton is centred on Church Street, Winner Street and Palace Avenue, which contain fine examples of Victorian architecture. Kirkham House is a late medieval stone house, which is open to the public at certain times of the year. The Coverdale Tower adjacent to Paignton Parish Church is named after Bishop Miles Coverdale, who published an English translation of the Bible in 1536. Coverdale was Bishop of Exeter between 1551 and 1553 and is reputed to have lived in the tower, although this is doubted by modern historians.

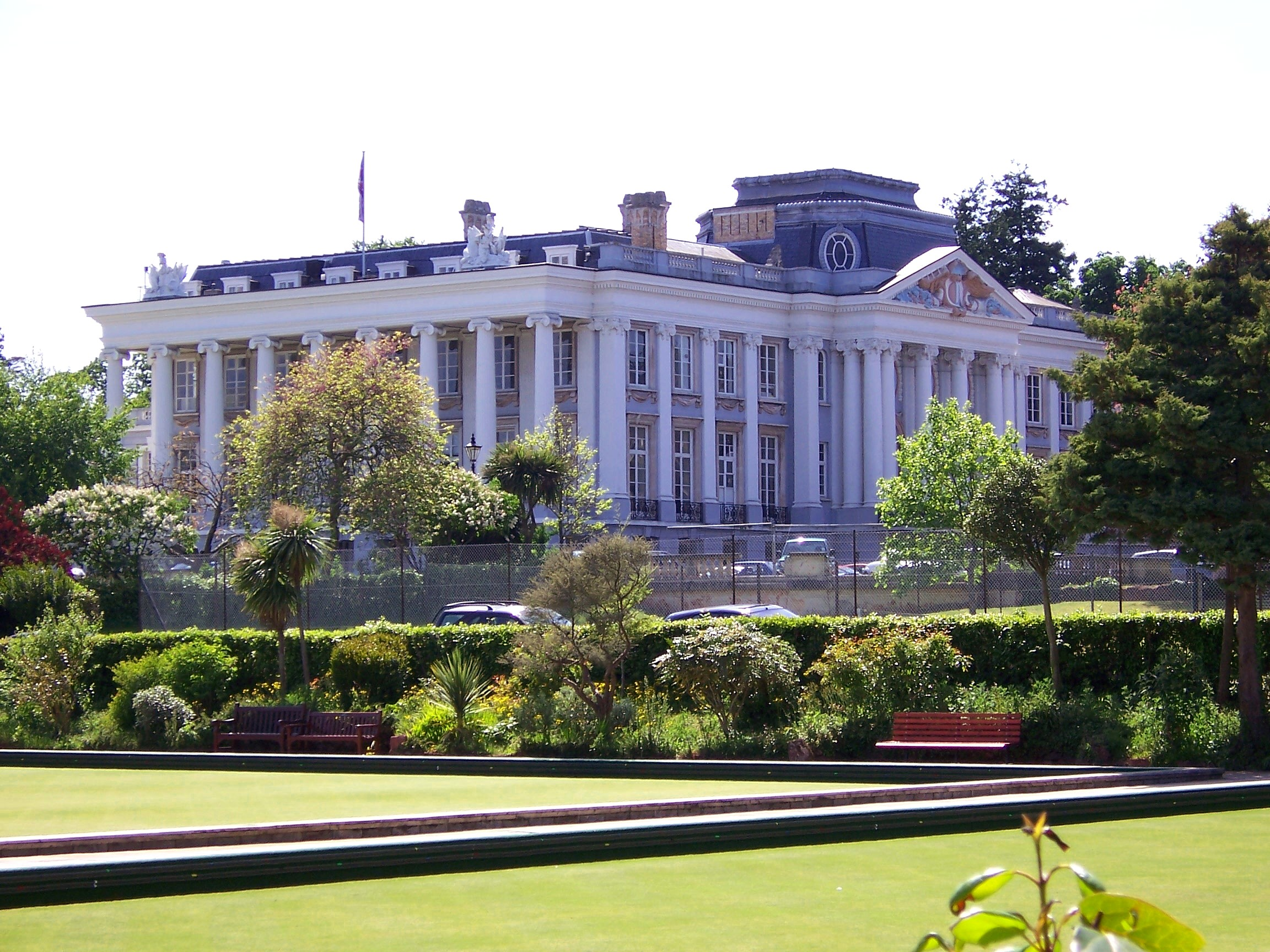
Oldway Mansion was built for Isaac Merritt Singer

The railway line to Paignton was built by the Dartmouth and Torbay Railway and opened to passengers on 2 August 1859, providing Torquay and Paignton with a link to London.

The Paignton Pudding, first made in the 13th century, is the origin of the nickname pudden eaters for the people of Paignton. The puddings were made infrequently and were of great size. When thousands turned up hoping to obtain a piece of a huge pudding that had been baked to celebrate the arrival of the railway in 1859 chaos occurred and the event became notorious. A Paignton Pudding was baked in 1995 to celebrate the 700th anniversary of the town's market charter and another in 2006 to mark the 200th anniversary of the birth of the engineer Isambard Kingdom Brunel.

Oldway Mansion is a large house with gardens constructed in the 1870s for Isaac Merritt Singer, who had amassed a considerable fortune with his improvements to the sewing machine. The building was occupied by Torbay Council until an agreement was signed in September 2012 to develop the site into a hotel and retirement apartments. Other Singer legacies in Paignton include the Palace Hotel and the Inn on the Green, which were built as homes for Singer's sons Washington and Mortimer.

Torquay Tramways were extended into Paignton in 1911 but the network was closed in 1934.

== Governance ==
There is only one tier of local government covering Paignton, being the unitary authority of Torbay, which covers a larger area than just Paignton, also including Brixham and Torquay. Torbay Council is based at Torquay Town Hall.

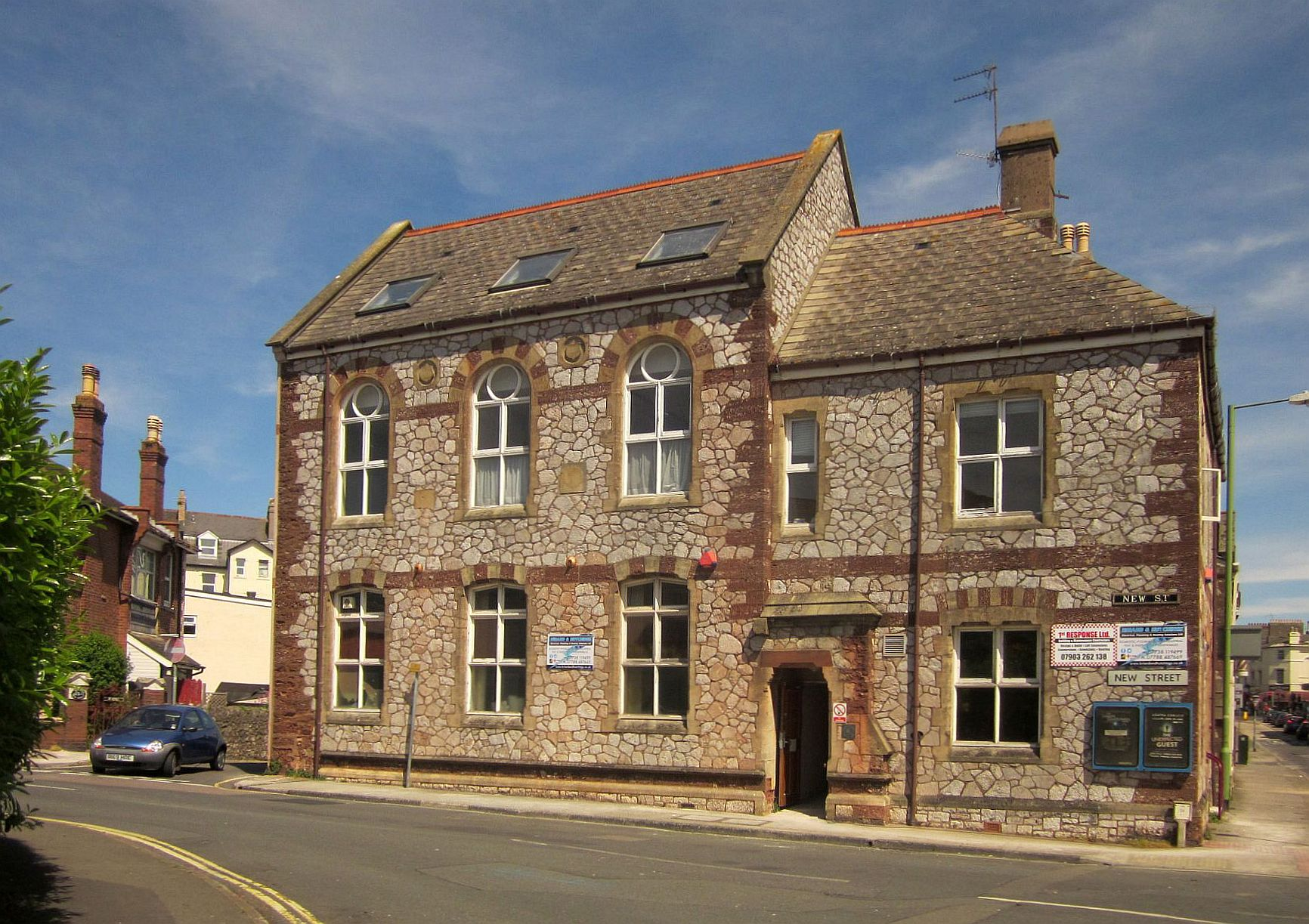
Old Town Hall, New Street, built 1870.

Paignton was an ancient parish. The parish included the hamlets of Goodrington and Preston, which were gradually absorbed into Paignton's urban area as it grew. Until 1863 the parish was administered by its vestry in the same way as most rural areas. Paignton was made a local government district in 1863, governed by a local board. The local board built itself what is now the Old Town Hall, Paignton, at the corner of New Street and Totnes Road, being completed in 1870.

Local boards were reconstituted as urban district councils in 1894. In 1946, the council bought Oldway Mansion to serve as its headquarters, having outgrown the old Town Hall.

In 1968 the urban districts of Paignton and Brixham, the municipal borough of Torquay and the parish of Churston Ferrers were all abolished. A county borough called Torbay was created to cover the whole area (with some adjustments of the boundaries to neighbouring parishes at the same time). As a county borough, Torbay was administratively independent from Devon County Council. Six years later, in 1974, local government was reformed again, with Torbay becoming a non-metropolitan district and Devon County Council providing county-level services to the area again. Torbay regained its independence from the county council in 1998 when it was made a unitary authority. Torbay remains part of the ceremonial county of Devon for the purposes of lieutenancy.

Most of Paignton is in the Torbay constituency. At the 2015 general election, Kevin Foster became the Conservative MP with a majority of 3,286. He retained it with a majority of 14,283 in 2017. Some areas in the southern and western parts of the town are in the South Devon constituency. In 2015, Sarah Wollaston retained the seat for the Conservative Party with a majority of 18,385, reduced to 13,477 in 2017. Wollaston resigned from the Conservative Party in February 2019, moving between various political parties and sitting as an independent MP, before standing for the Liberal Democrats at the December 2019 general election. She was defeated by the Conservative candidate, Anthony Mangnall, with a majority of 12,724.

At the 2024 General Election, Kevin Foster was replaced by Liberal Democrat Steve Darling and Anthony Mangall by Liberal Democrat Caroline Voaden.

== Economy ==
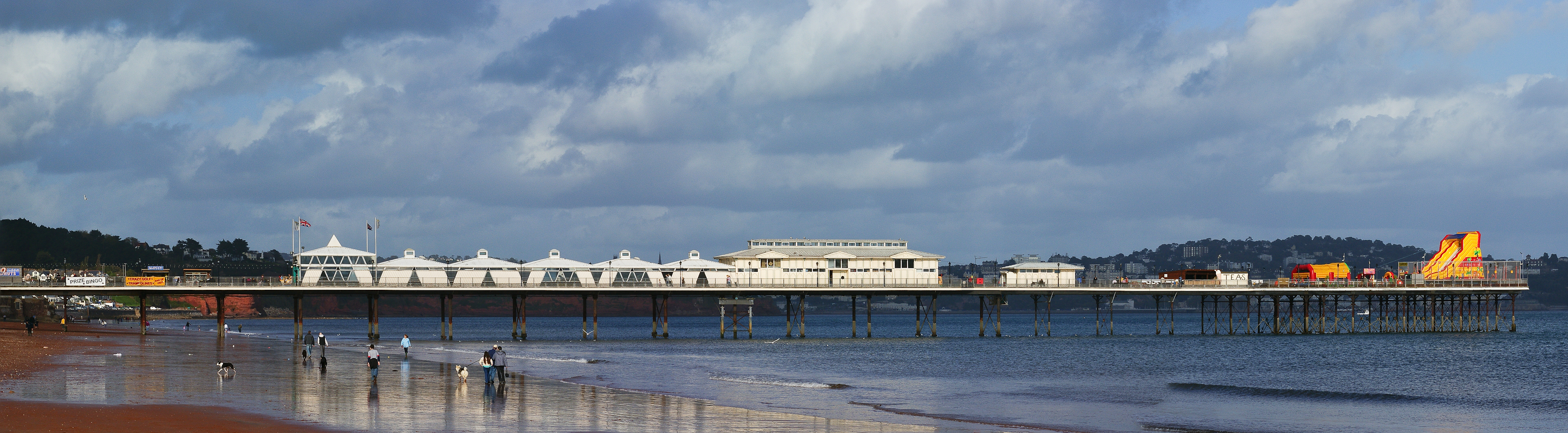
Paignton Pier (1879) and beach

Paignton's economy relies extensively on tourism and the town is marketed as a location for family holidays. The main seafront area is dominated by Paignton Pier, a 780-foot (240 m) long structure opened in 1879. It was designed by George Soudon Bridgman, the local architect who also designed the original Oldway Mansion.

The Festival Theatre, opened in 1967, was once a seafront theatre capable of staging large summer shows. In 1999 it was converted into a multiscreen cinema. The English Riviera Air show (formerly known as the "Torbay Air show"), launched in 2016, is held over the Bay in front of Paignton Sands in early June annually. The Paignton Festival (formerly known as the "Torbay Carnival") is over 100 years old and is held annually in late July. It features a Carnival Procession together with various entertainments and charity stalls on The Green.

Regatta Week during early August is the peak holiday season. During this period there is a funfair on Paignton Green, along with a large fireworks display. Later in August is Children's Week, which includes a wide range of events and competitions. Paignton has a variety of holiday accommodation, complemented by numerous pubs, nightclubs and restaurants.

Tourist attractions include Paignton Zoo and the Dartmouth Steam Railway, which operates steam trains from Paignton to Kingswear, from where a ferry can be taken across the River Dart to Dartmouth. The line was sold in 1972 without cessation of services by British Rail in the aftermath of the cutbacks of the Beeching era in the 1960s, and is operated today as a heritage railway line. The 630 mile South West Coast Path National Trail runs along the coast.

Suttons Seeds, a supplier of seeds, bulbs and horticultural products, is based in Paignton.

== Places of interest ==
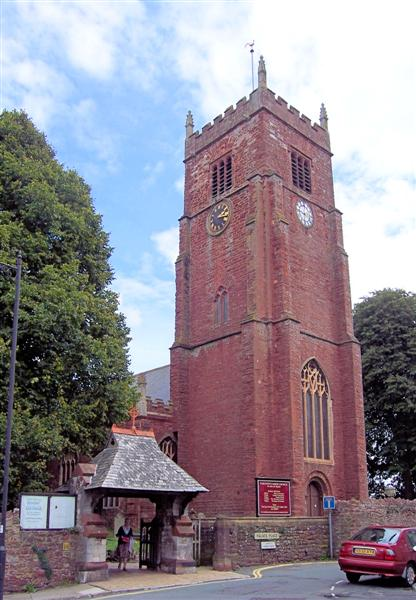
St John the Baptist, The oldest of the five Parish Churches in Paignton. The tower was built c. 1327 and 1438

The Paignton Picture House (now closed) is believed to have been Europe's oldest purpose-built cinema and was built in 1907. Seat 2 Row 2 of the circle was the favourite seat of Torquay-born crime novelist Agatha Christie, who lived in neighbouring Galmpton. The cinemas and theatres in her books are all said to be based on the Paignton Picture House. It was also used as a location for the 1984 Donald Sutherland film Ordeal by Innocence and the 1981 film The French Lieutenant's Woman (which was filmed mainly at Lyme Regis in Dorset).

The Royal Bijou Theatre is now demolished, but a blue plaque marking its former location can be found next to the Thomas Cook travel agency in Hyde Road. The theatre was the venue for the premiere of The Pirates of Penzance by Gilbert and Sullivan on 30 December 1879. The performance was given at short notice to secure the British copyright on the work after problems had arisen with unauthorised performances of HMS Pinafore in the USA. The Palace Theatre in Palace Avenue has been the main theatre in the town since the conversion of the Festival Theatre to a cinema in 1998.

The department store Rossiters was a centrepiece of the town until its closure in January 2009. The store is said to have been the inspiration for the sitcom Are You Being Served? In 2010, it reopened as a discount store.

From 1889 to 1897 the mathematician Oliver Heaviside lived in Palace Avenue, in the building now occupied by Barclays Bank. A commemorative blue plaque can be seen on the wall. Heaviside is buried in Paignton Cemetery.

== Beaches ==
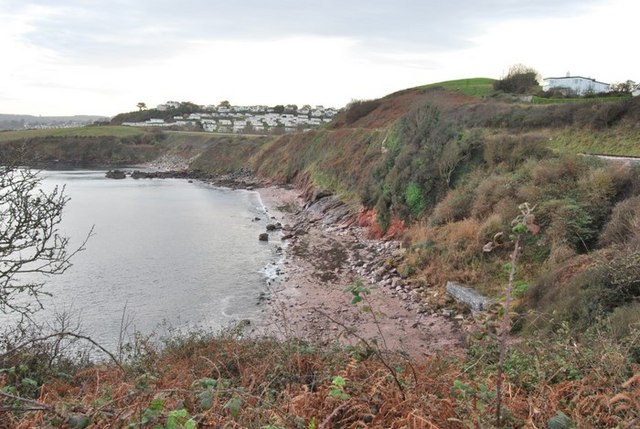
Saltern Cove is a Site of Special Scientific Interest.

Paignton beach and the nearby Preston Sands, which are continuous at low tide, are used for water sports including kite surfing and dinghy sailing. Both are sandy and gently shelving and have no strong currents, making them popular with swimmers and families. Both have green spaces immediately inland. Paignton Green has a pirate-themed Adventure Golf course and the Paignton Geoplay Park, a children's play area, which has the area's geology as its theme, inspired by the UNESCO Global Geopark of which Paignton is a part.

Immediately to the east of Paignton Harbour is Fairy Cove, which has no facilities, but features good exposures of the Torbay Breccia, a red sandstone with pieces of rock which washed into it when the area was a desert. Also within the former Urban District of Paignton lies Goodrington which has another popular beach backed by Young's Park, with its boating lake, and a large outdoor waterpark, Splashdown Quaywest. Beyond Goodrington are Waterside and Saltern Coves, which have no facilities and are accessed through fields, followed by Broadsands, on the Brixham border.

The reed beds found behind Broadsands beach are a haunt of the rare cirl bunting. Hollicombe beach, situated at Paignton's northern boundary with Torquay, features a geological stratotype at its northern end, known as the "Corbyn's Head Member" Elberry Cove is used by jetski enthusiasts, while Saltern Cove is a Site of Special Scientific Interest due to its distinctive geology and its marine biology.

== Transport ==
=== Railway ===
Paignton railway station is situated close to the town centre and is a short walk from the beach along Torbay Road. Train services are provided mainly by Great Western Railway; these consist of approximately half-hourly services to Torquay, Newton Abbot, Exeter and Exmouth along the Riviera Line, with some longer distance services to Taunton, Bristol, Cardiff and London Paddington. CrossCountry provides two services per day currently to Manchester Piccadilly station via Bristol.

==== Heritage ====
Queen's Park station, for services on the Dartmouth Steam Railway, is adjacent to the main railway station on the beachside of the level crossing. A service of steam trains is provided from February to December, although it is daily only between April and October.

The other railway station in Paignton is Goodrington Sands (opened in 1928), which is now part of the Dartmouth Steam Railway.

=== Buses and coaches ===
The bus and coach station faces the main entrance to the railway station. Bus services are provided by Stagecoach South West, Torbay Minibuses, Country Bus (Newton Abbot) and the Dartmouth Steam Railway & Riverboat Company. Principal services lead to Totnes and Plymouth; Torquay and Newton Abbot; Torquay, Teignmouth and Dawlish Warren; Brixham; and Kingswear, for the ferry to Dartmouth. A range of long-distance coach services is operated by National Express.

=== Ferries ===
Ferry services are provided seasonally by Paignton Pleasure Cruises and We Ferry to Torquay and Brixham from Paignton Harbour.

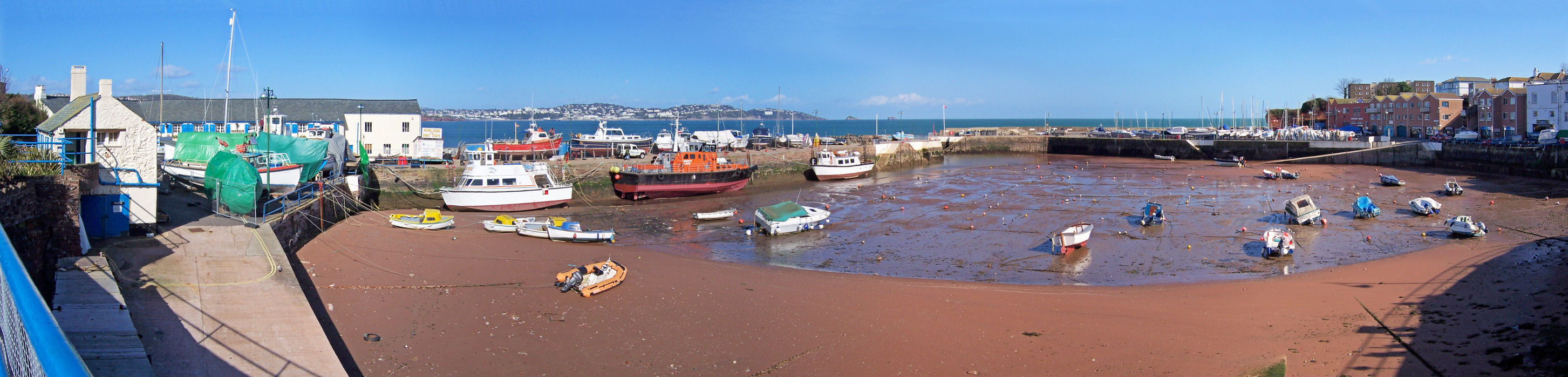
Paignton Harbour, with Torquay in the background

== People ==
Notable people born in Paignton include:

- John Gosling (The Kinks musician)
- Matthew Hockley

== See also ==
- List of towns and cities in Devon by population
- List of schools in Torbay
- Kirkham House
- Paignton Academy
- Redcliffe Hotel
- Torbay Inn
