= Akeley, Buckinghamshire =

Village in Buckinghamshire, England

Coordinates: 52.033°N 0.970°W

Akeley
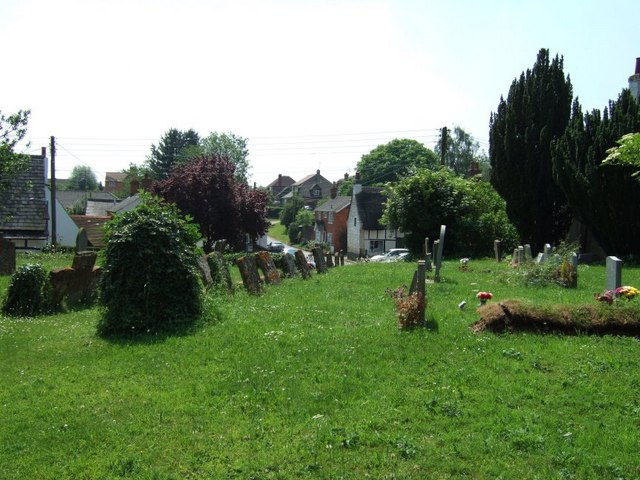
- Akeley from the churchyard in 2006

- Location within Buckinghamshire
- Population: 514 (2011)
- OS grid reference: SP7037
- Civil parish: Akeley
- Unitary authority: Buckinghamshire
- Ceremonial county: Buckinghamshire
- Region: South East
- Country: England
- Sovereign state: United Kingdom
- Post town: BUCKINGHAM
- Postcode district: MK18
- Dialling code: 01280
- Police: Thames Valley
- Fire: Buckinghamshire
- Ambulance: South Central
- UK Parliament: Buckingham and Bletchley
- Website: Akeley Parish Council

Akeley is a village and civil parish in north-west Buckinghamshire, England. The village is on the A413 road, between Lillingstone Dayrell and Maids Moreton, and around 2.5 miles (4 km) north of Buckingham. The 2011 Census recorded the population of the parish as 514, down from 545 at the 2001 Census.

== Village background ==
The village name is derived from the Old English for "Oak Field". The Domesday Book of 1086 recorded it as Achelei.

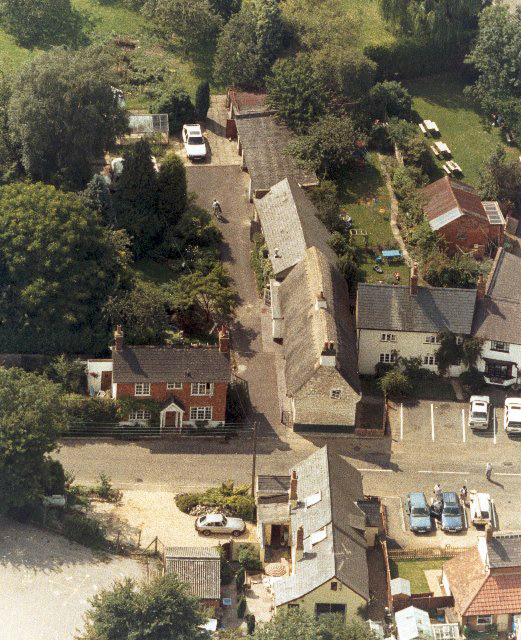
The Square, Akeley – aerial view taken in 1996 soon after the renovation of Verendale, the thatched cottage at the centre of the picture. The brick cottage is The Old School House and the building in the foreground is The Old School. The Bull & Butcher pub in The Square is part seen far right.

The village was controlled by the Cluniac priory of nearby Newton Longville on behalf of the priory of Saint Faith in Longueville in northern France. The parish church of St. James the Apostle was built in Akeley in 1154. It was rebuilt to designs by the Gothic Revival architect John Tarring in 1854 and restored in 1901. By the mid 20th century St. James' had fallen into disrepair and in 1982 it was demolished. Akeley presently does not have its own parish church; it is part of the North Buckingham ecclesiastical parish.

Akeley once had a medieval deer park, and a school where poor children were taught to make lace.

== Amenities ==
The village has a small primary school St James Church of England School, and outside the village the large Cognita run private Akeley Wood School.

The village has a pub (Bull & Butcher) and opened a new village hall in 2006.

Akeley hosts an annual horticultural show, which has been run since 1976.

== Stockholt ==
The ancient hamlet of Stockholt once lay within the parish boundary. It has been amalgamated with the modern village.

== Sources ==
- Page, William, ed. (1927). Victoria County History: A History of the County of Buckingham, Volume 4. pp. 144–147.
- Pevsner, Nikolaus (1973) [1960]. The Buildings of England: Buckinghamshire. Harmondsworth: Penguin Books. p. 46. ISBN 0-14-071019-1.
