= Torbay Inn =

Historic public house in Paignton, Devon

The Torbay Inn
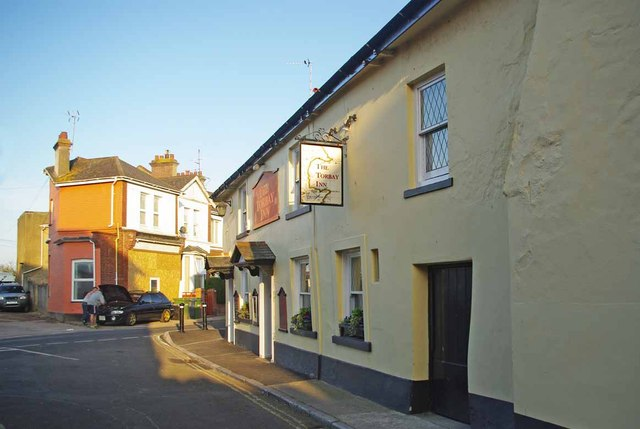

- Location within Devon

General information
- Type: Public House
- Location: 34 Fisher Street, Paignton, England
- Coordinates: 50.430957°N 3.568549°W
- Named for: Torbay

Design and construction
- Designations: Grade II Listed Building

The Torbay Inn is a historic public house in the town of Paignton, Devon. It is the town's oldest public house, dating to the early 17th century. It has been a Grade II listed building since 1975.
