= Kirkham House =

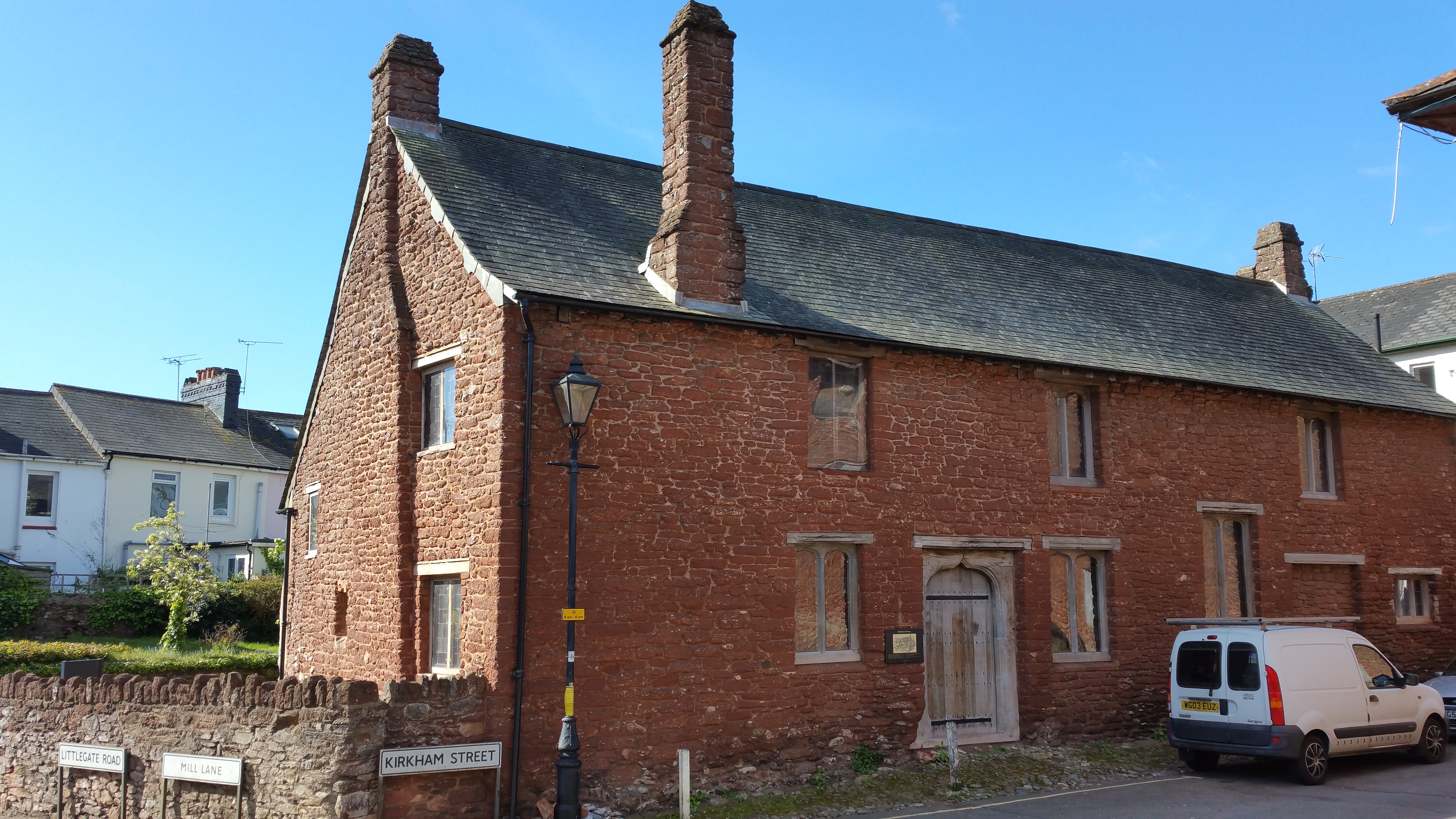
- Northern aspect of Kirkham House

- Location of Kirkham House in Devon
- 50.43816°N 3.57036°W
- Location: Paignton, Devon

Site notes
- Governing body: English Heritage

Listed Building – Grade II*

Kirkham House is a late medieval stone house in Paignton, Devon, England. It is believed to be a 14th- or 15th-century building. The house was designated a Grade II* listed building on 13 March 1951.

== History ==
There is no documentary evidence of who built Kirkham House or when. The design suggests that it is of 14th- or 15th-century origin, and it has been called "The Priest's House", suggesting the residence of a church official, or a priest of the Kirkham Chantry. The house may have been built as the residence of a prosperous local merchant. Mrs Ada Frances Jennings bequeathed the house to the nation in 1960, together with a sum of money for its repair. The stone and plasterwork have been extensively renovated, but many of the original oak beams and carvings can still be seen. The building contains reproduction furniture and tapestries in the medieval style.

== Structure ==
The building is a single-depth cottage with three rooms, and is made of breccia with a slate roof. The ground floor of the house consists of a parlour and a large vaulted hall that would have been used for entertaining guests, while the first floor has a gallery and three bedchambers. The kitchen was an outbuilding that exists today only as a few ruined walls, and there is a small garden adjacent to the house. It also includes a cast-iron pump outside the kitchen area.

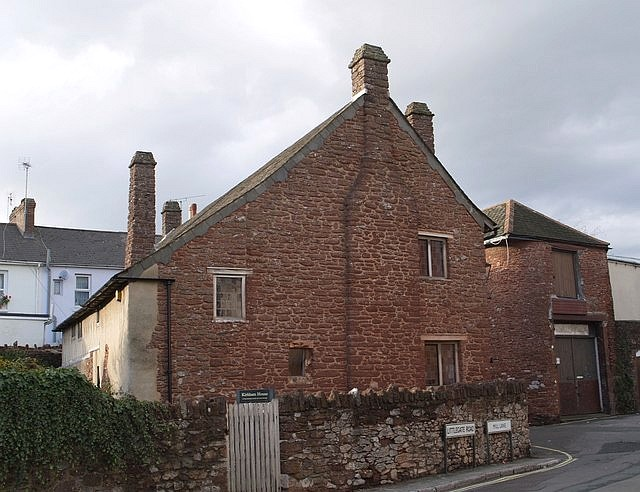
Exterior of Kirkham House, eastern aspect

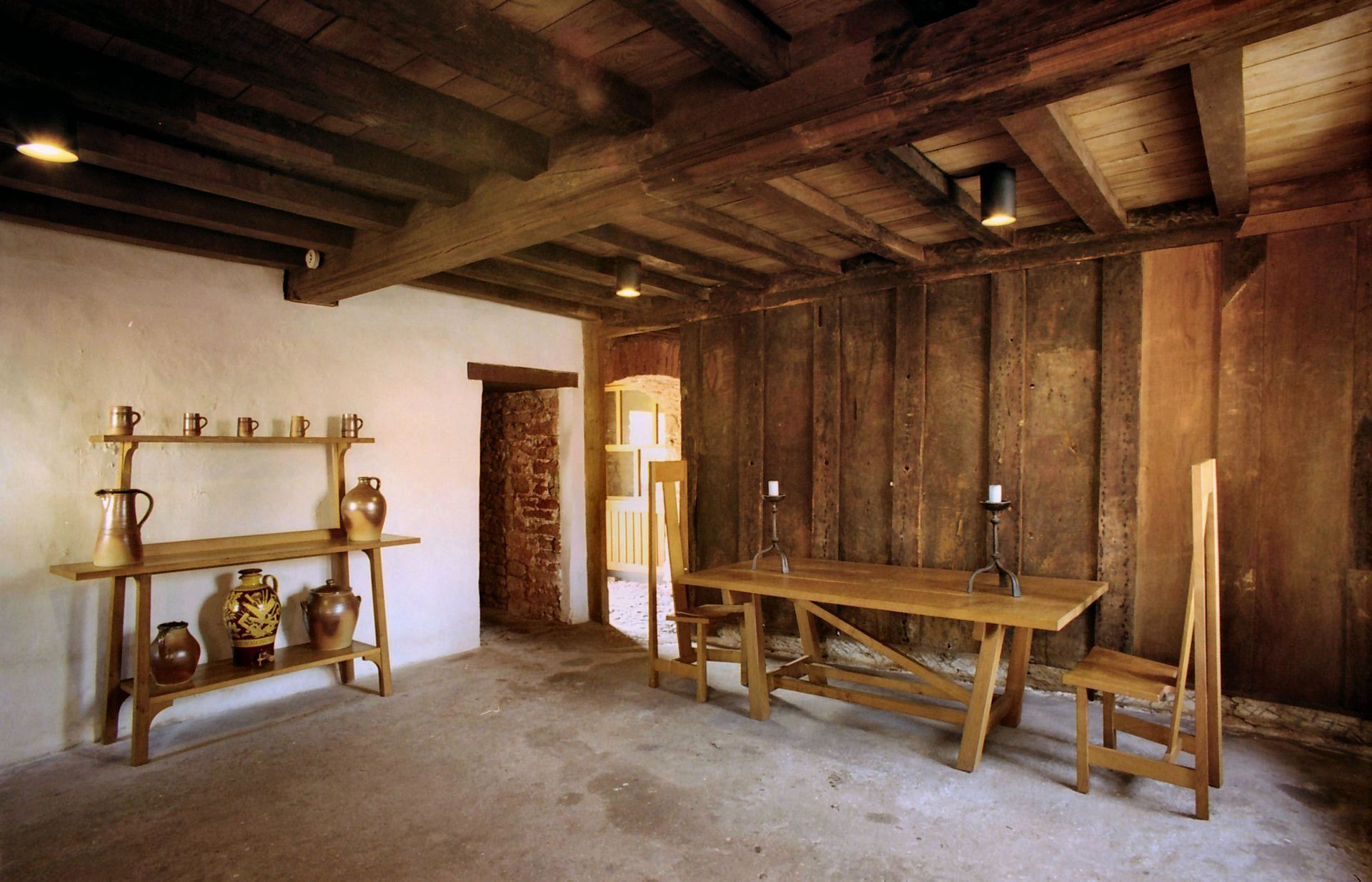
Parlour of Kirkham House

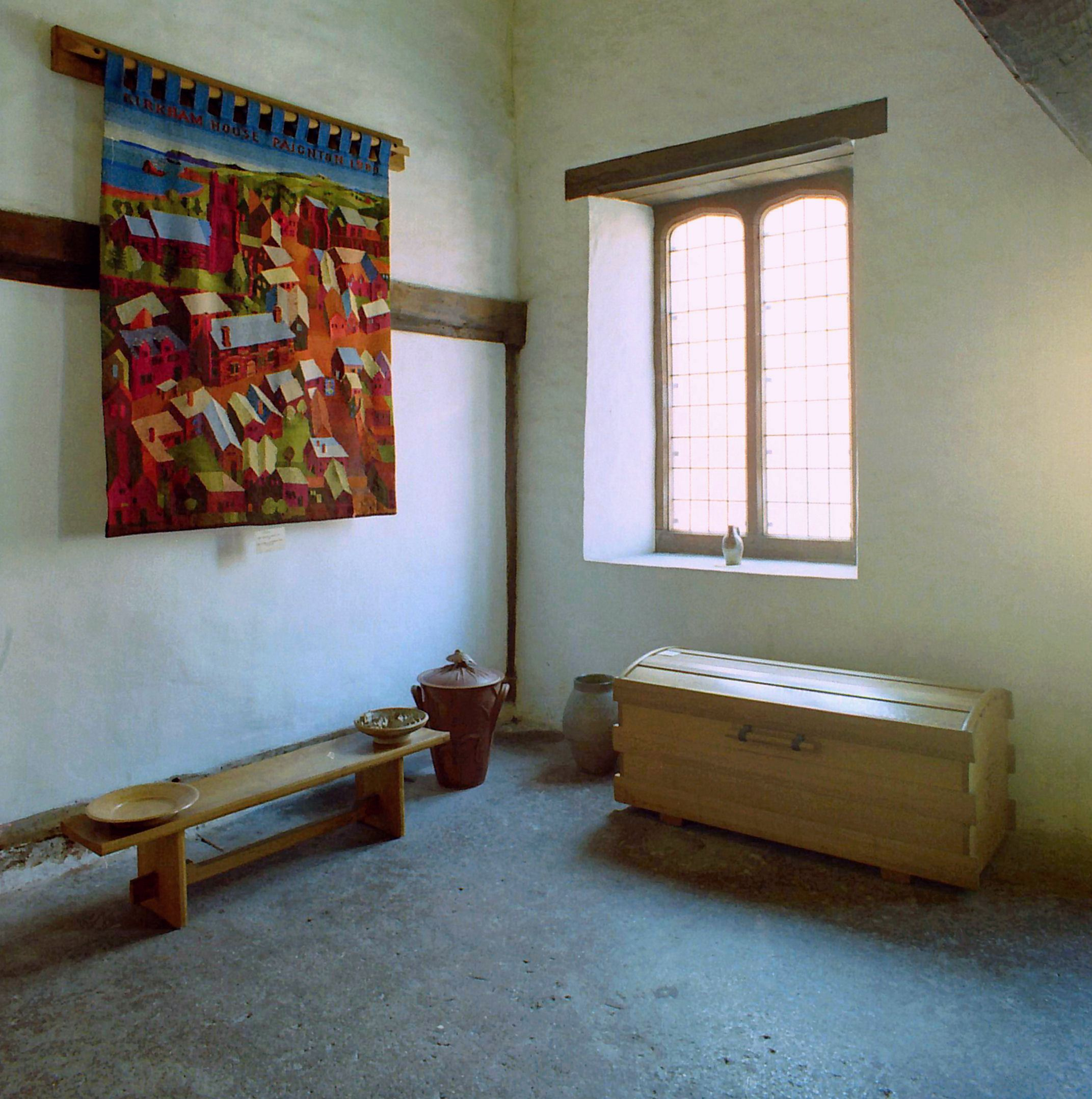
Hall of Kirkham House

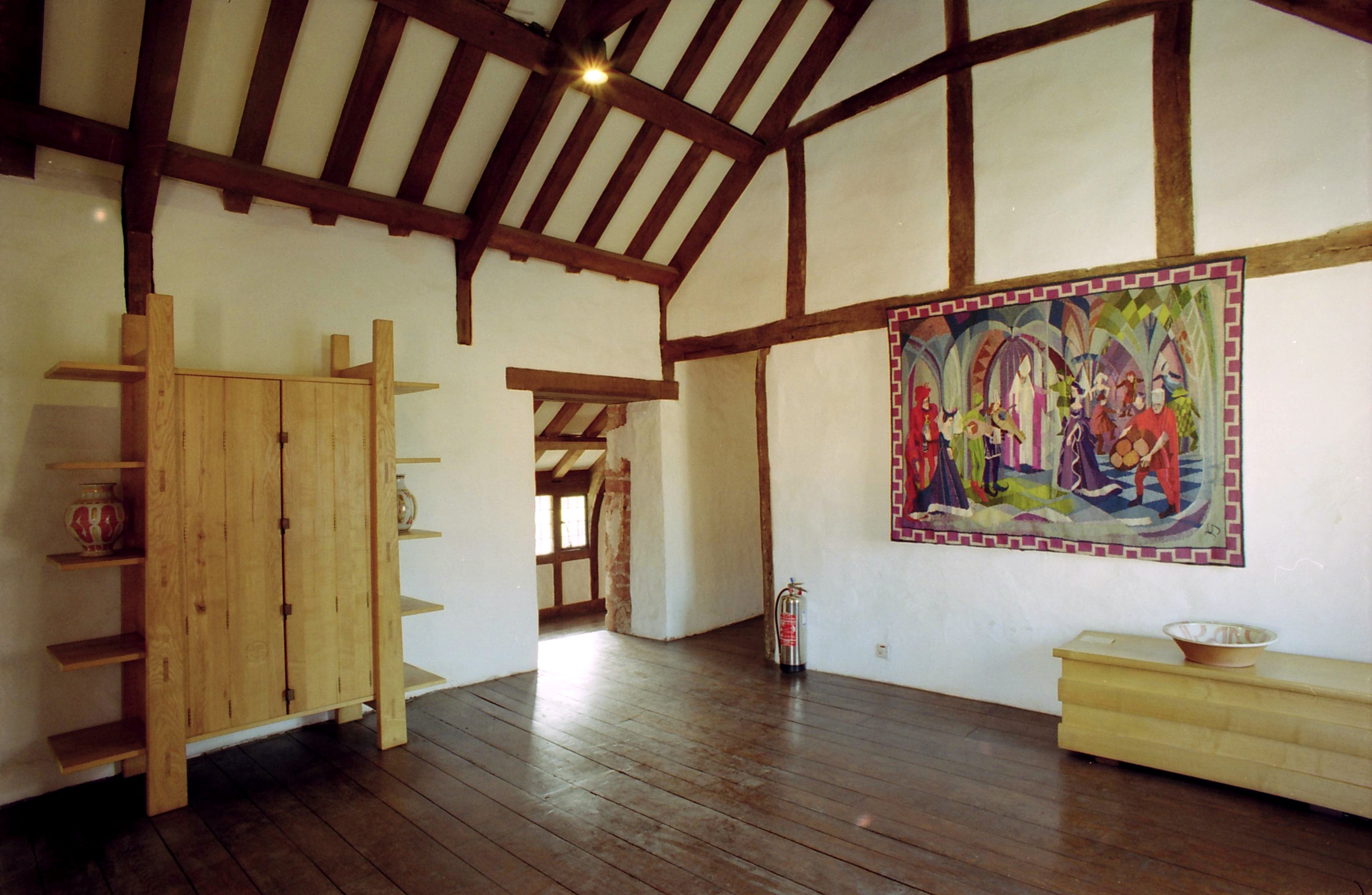
First floor bedchamber, named the Best Chamber

== Visiting ==
Kirkham House is managed by English Heritage, and it is open to the public at certain times of year. The building is located off Cecil Road at Ordnance Survey map reference SX885610.

== See also ==
- Oldway Mansion
