= Redcliffe Hotel =

Historic hotel in Paignton, Devon

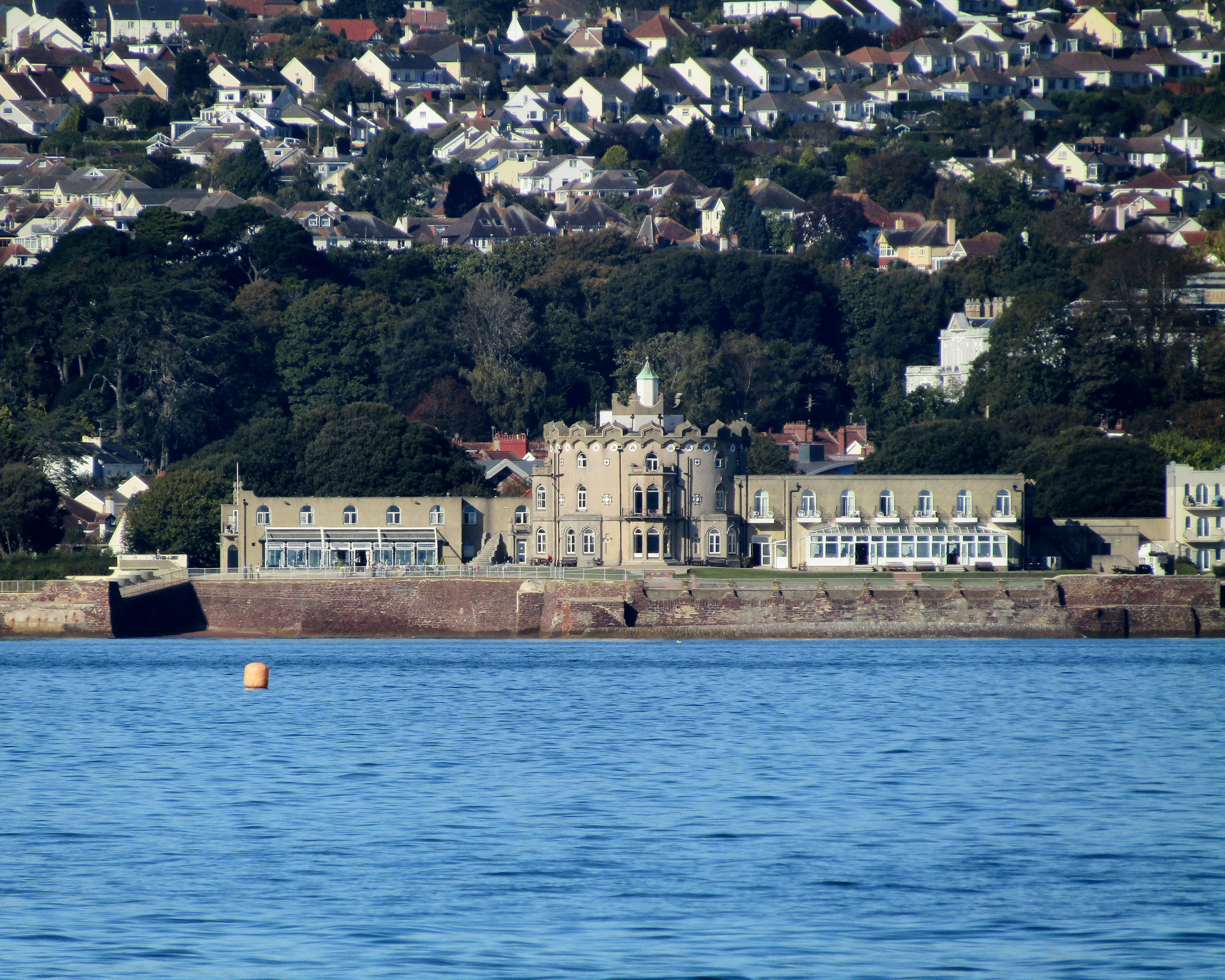
- The hotel from the sea

- Location within Devon
- Former names: Redcliff Tower

General information
- Status: Open
- Location: 4 Marine Drive, Paignton, England
- Coordinates: 50.441021°N 3.557707°W

Design and construction
- Designations: Grade II Listed Building

Website
- redcliffehotel.co.uk

The Redcliffe Hotel formerly known as Hotel Redcliffe and Redcliff Tower is a hotel situated beside the sea between Paignton Beach and Preston Sands in Paignton, Devon, England. It is a Grade II Listed Building and was first listed in 1951.
