= 1–4 Hyde Park Gate =

Mansion block in London, England

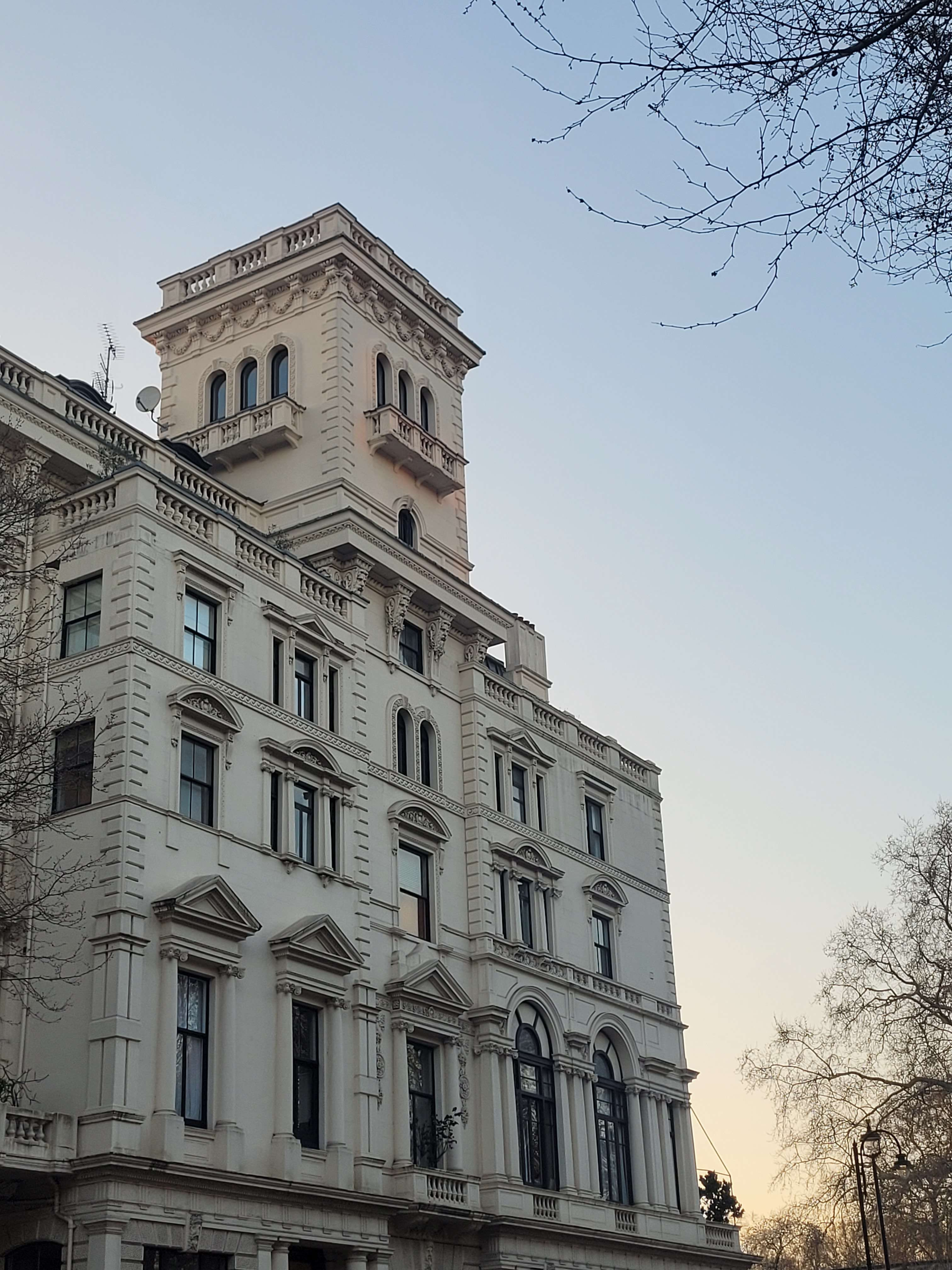
- The tower overlooking Queen's Gate
- Interactive map of the 1–4 Hyde Park Gate area

General information
- Type: Residential
- Architectural style: Italianate
- Location: London, England
- Coordinates: 51°30′04″N 0°10′51″W
- Completed: 1860

Design and construction
- Architect: John Tarring

Listed Building – Grade II
- Official name: 1-4 AND 4A, HYDE PARK GATE SW7
- Designated: 13 December 2000
- Reference no.: 1080596

1–4 Hyde Park Gate is a Victorian Grade II listed mansion block that stands overlooking Kensington Gardens in London.

== History and description ==
The building was built between 1857 and 1860 on the Harrington Estate. Despite originally intended to be designed by Charles James Richardson the job was instead given to John Tarring, whose design provided larger mansions, the tower facing Queen's Gate reaching 30m.

The buildings are rendered in a stucco Italianate style. Building News described the buildings as they neared their completion as an exemplary set of houses, publishing that they "may be fairly classed with the best specimens of domestic architecture around London, both in respect to their artistic treatment, and workmanship."

== See also ==
- Queen's Gate
- Equestrian Statue of Robert Napier
