= Equestrian statue of Robert Napier =

Equestrian statue in Kensington, London

Coordinates: 51.5013°N 0.1803°W

Field Marshal Lord Napier of Magdala
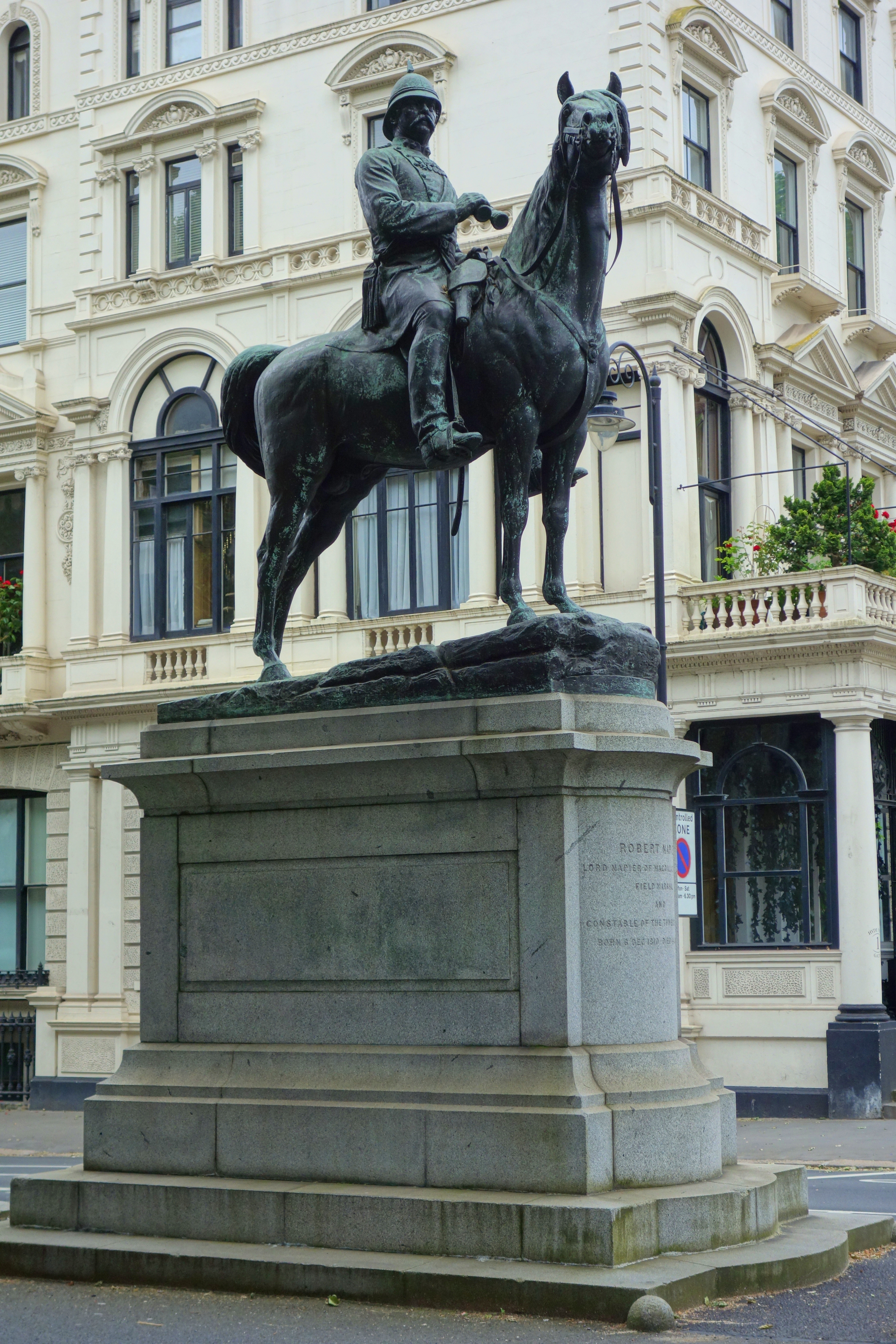
- Equestrian statue of Robert Napier, in London, 1–4 Hyde Park Gate visible behind
- Artist: Joseph Edgar Boehm
- Completion date: 1891
- Subject: Robert Napier, 1st Baron Napier of Magdala
- Location: London

Listed Building – Grade II
- Official name: Statue of Field Marshal Lord Napier
- Designated: 15 April 1969
- Reference no.: 1224311

The Equestrian statue of Robert Napier is a Grade II listed statue at the northern end of Queen's Gate in Kensington.

Lord Napier was of a military background and served in India and China. His most significant act, for which he would receive his baronetcy, was leading the British expedition to Abyssinia in 1867–1868. Here he would capture Magdala with the aim of freeing European hostages taken by Tewodros II.

The statue was designed by Joseph Edward Boehm and depicts Napier in tropical uniform holding binoculars. Completed in 1891, it was originally placed in Waterloo Place but in 1921 was moved to be replaced by an equestrian statue of Edward VII, which itself had a lengthy process in deciding a location for. The statue is a replica of one erected in Kolkata.

In 2004, the local council and English Heritage gave permission to a local student of the Royal College of Art to cover the statue in red duct tape, despite the permission granted from such bodies the artwork would spark controversy.
