= John Tarring =

British architect (1806–1875)

Tarring designed the Congregational Memorial Hall which opened in 1875.

John Tarring FRIBA (1806–1875) was an English Victorian ecclesiastical architect active in the mid-nineteenth century. Based in London, he designed many Gothic Revival churches for Nonconformist clients.

== Life ==
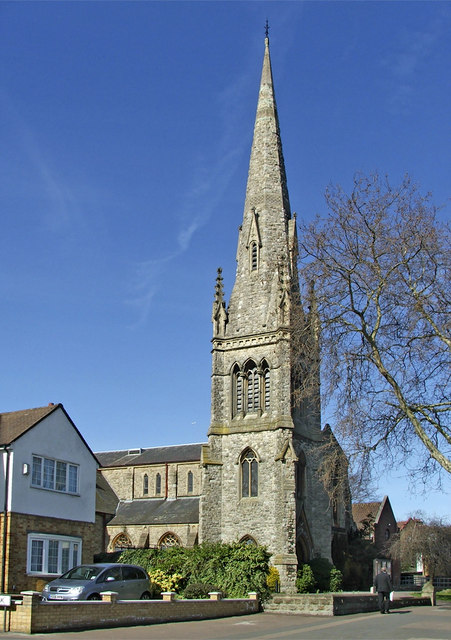
Christ Church, Chase Side, Enfield (1874-7)

Tarring was born at Holbeton, near Plymouth, and worked there as a carpenter or plasterer until moving to London in 1828. He studied at Brown's academy in Wells Street, and obtained a Royal Academy medal for a measured drawing. He became a member of the Royal Institute of British Architects in 1845.

Tarring worked principally in London. His firm was variously known as "John Tarring, Esq.," "Tarring & Jones," and "J. Tarring & Son." His son Frederick William Tarring (1847–1925) succeeded him in the business.

Known as the "Gilbert Scott of the Dissenters", he was the first architect to design a spire for a nonconformist church in London, and is thought to have influenced the Baptists and Congregationalists to begin building churches in the Gothic style. Most of his commissions were nonconformist churches, although he had one remodelling commission of an Anglican chapel.

In 1856 he rebuilt George Whitefield's chapel in Tottenham Court Road. The site had recently been bought by the London Congregational Building Society, following the destruction of the existing chapel by fire. Tarring's building had a dome 126 feet (38 m) high. It was closed in 1889 due to subsidence, and later demolished.

Tarring designed at least one church building in Ireland, Trinity Presbyterian Church, Cork, (1861) in a Gothic style with a distinctive spire. The interior has a gallery to the rear with a pipe organ installed there in 1904 and seats for a choir, typical of Roman Catholic churches of the locality, although it may have been intended originally to provide free seating for those unable to afford pew rents; the rest of the interior with a central pulpit, no central aisle and no pillars may reflect Tarring's work on non conformist churches and chapels in the South of England.

Apart from his ecclesiastical work, he restored Combermere Abbey, Cheshire, and Thornton Hall, Buckinghamshire, and designed private residences. At Queen's Gate, Hyde Park, London, in 1860, he built a large mansion block in an Italianate style.

He returned to Devon, and died at Torquay on 27 December 1875. He is buried at Kensal Green Cemetery, London.

== List of works ==
=== Ecclesiastical ===
- Westminster Chapel, Buckingham Gate (1841). Erected by the Metropolitan Chapel Fund Association. Demolished and replaced by the present building by W.F. Poulton in 1865.
- Horbury Congregational Chapel, Kensington Park Road, Notting Hill Gate (1848–9). Closed in 1935 and renamed Kensington Temple, owned first by the Church of the Foursquare Gospel and then by the Elim Pentecostal Church.
- Bethnal Green Meeting House, formerly Pott Street Chapel (1849).
- Congregational Church, Grafton Square, Clapham (1851–2). Demolished.
- St James' Parish church, Akeley, Buckinghamshire (1854; demolished 1982).
- Vines Congregational Church, Rochester, Kent (1854).
- Whitefield's Chapel, Tottenham Court Road (1856).
- Chelsea Congregational Church, Markham Square, Chelsea (1858–60). With a spire 138 feet (42 m) tall. It was designed to accommodate 1,150 adult worshippers, and had schoolrooms attached.
- Trinity Presbyterian Church, Summer Hill, Cork City, Ireland (1860–5).
- Free Church, Market Place, St Ives, Huntingdonshire (1863).
- Weybridge United Reformed Church, Queens Road, Weybridge, Surrey (1864)
- Methodist church, Lady Margaret Road, Hampstead, London (1864–7); now the Roman Catholic Church of Our Lady Help of Christians.
- Lansdowne Crescent Methodist Church, Great Malvern, Worcestershire (1865).
- Victoria Road Church, Leicester (1866)
- United Reformed Church, High Street, Lewisham (1867).
- Ealing Broadway Methodist Church, Ealing (1868). Designed in collaboration with Charles Jones. Now a Polish Roman Catholic church.
- Wesleyan Methodist Church, Mostyn Road, Brixton (1868). Demolished and replaced in the 1980s.
- Southernhay Congregational (now United Reformed) Church, Exeter, Devon (1868). Only the tower and spire of Tarring's church survive; the rest is modern.
- Congregational church, Stamford Hill, London, with adjoining lecture hall (1869–71). Church demolished 1969, lecture hall used for services from then on.
- Congregational Memorial Hall, Farringdon Street, London (1872). Demolished 1969.
- Christ Church, Chase Side, Enfield (1874-7). Congregationalist.

=== Secular ===
- Combermere Abbey, Cheshire (restoration).
- Thornton Hall (now Thornton College), Buckinghamshire. Restoration and additions, including a new wing, and a new front to the main building. Tarring's work at Thornton, for the Hon. Richard Cavendish, was begun in 1851.
- Tromer Lodge, Downe, Kent. Alterations, including the addition of a tower, for the Rev. Robert Ainslie.
- Mansion Block, Queen's Gate, Hyde Park, London, in an Italianate style (1860).
- City Bank, Ludgate Hill, London (1875).
- Old Town Hall, Paignton, Devon (1870).

== Sources ==
- Cherry, Bridget; Pevsner, Nikolaus (1990) [1983]. London 2: South. The Buildings of England. London: Penguin Books.

Attribution

This article incorporates text from a publication now in the public domain: Lee, Sidney, ed. (1898). "Tarring, John". Dictionary of National Biography. Vol. 55. London: Smith, Elder & Co.
