= Benjamin Scott =

Chamberlain of the City of London

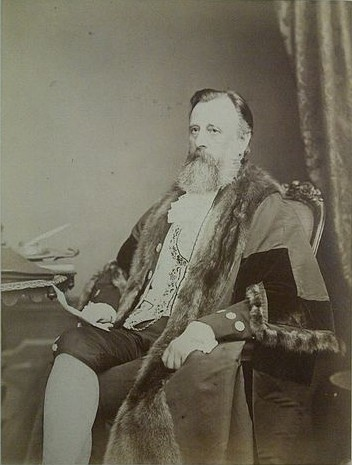
- Born: 15 April 1814; Islington, England
- Died: 17 January 1892 (aged 77); Notting Hill, England
- Burial place: Weybridge, Surrey
- Occupation: Chamberlain of the City of London
- Years active: 1858-1892
- Spouse: Kate Glegg (m. 1842–1892)

Benjamin Scott FRAS (15 April 1814 – 17 January 1892) served as the Chamberlain of the City of London, from 1858 until his death. As well as an enduring figure in the life of the city, he was a committed social activist of the age, collaborating with prominent campaigners such as Josephine Butler and W. T. Stead.

== Early life ==
He was born 15 April 1814 in Islington, the son of Benjamin Whinnell Scott, Chief clerk to the Chamberlain of London, and his wife Susan (née Saunders). He was also the grandson of the banker John Scott. Whilst just a teenager he entered the Chamberlain's office as a junior clerk. In 1841 upon the death of his father, he succeeded him as Chief clerk, and remained in the service of the City of London Corporation in that capacity during the chamberlainships of Sir James Shaw, Sir William Heygate and Anthony Brown.

== Chamberlain of the City ==
On the death of Brown early in 1853, Scott received a requisition as a liveryman of the Wheelwrights' Company, to stand for Chamberlain; the office was in the gift of the liverymen of the various livery companies. For nearly a century the post had been filled from the ranks of aldermen who had been Lord Mayor of London. Scott had for his opponent Alderman Sir John Key, who had been twice Lord Mayor (in 1830 and 1831). After a four days' poll, costing the candidates £10,000, Key was elected by a small majority (224 votes). At the end of 1853, after continuing friction produced by the contest, Scott resigned his appointments under the corporation and a year later became secretary of the new Bank of London, which he had taken part in establishing. In July 1858, on the death of Sir John Key, he again became a candidate for the office of Chamberlain and was elected without opposition. A shrewd financier, Scott enabled the corporation to weather Black Friday of the panic of 1866 without loss.

During over thirty years in the post Scott extended the Honorary Freedom of the City of London to many notable figures of the period, with an impressive ceremony held at Guildhall, and culminating in a speech and grand banquet hosted by the Lord Mayor in their honour. During his tenure these recipients included personalities such as: Richard Cobden (1861); George Peabody (1862); H.R.H. Albert Edward, Prince of Wales (1863); Giuseppe Garibaldi (1864); Ferdinand de Lesseps (1870); Angela Burdett-Coutts (1872); Ulysses S. Grant (1877); Benjamin Disraeli (1878); Rowland Hill (1879); General Sir Frederick Roberts (1880); William Gladstone (1881); The Earl of Shaftesbury (1884); H.R.H. Prince Albert Victor (1885); and Henry Morton Stanley (1887); among many others.

== Purity campaign ==
Along with Josephine Butler, W. T. Stead and the Salvation Army, Scott sought support to raise the age of consent, which was 12 years in the UK for most of the century. In 1879 with Alfred Stace Dyer, a prominent Quaker and publisher, he had set up the London Committee for Suppressing the Traffic in British Girls for Purposes of Continental Prostitution, and served as its chairman. The committee sought a rise in "social purity" and an end to the double standard between sexes, and had the support of Butler and other campaigners who were against the Contagious Diseases Acts.

Dyer and Scott were both members of the Gospel Purity Association that in April 1885 achieved a prosecution against a brothel run by a notorious London madam named Mary Jeffries; she was defended by Montagu Williams, persuaded to plead guilty, and the resulting sentence was a fine rather than closure. The following month saw a change of tactics, the case having shown prostitution had support in high places. Scott met with Bramwell Booth and Stead at Salvation Army Headquarters, in an effort to get Stead to publish a child prostitution story in the Pall Mall Gazette, for which he was the editor. The outcome was the sensational Eliza Armstrong case, the publication of The Maiden Tribute of Modern Babylon in July, and Stead's resulting sentence of imprisonment. On 18 November, Scott gave a speech alongside Millicent Fawcett at the Exeter Hall in solidarity with Stead. The year's campaign culminated in the passing of the Criminal Law Amendment Act; Scott published an account of his own efforts in a report to the London Committee entitled Six Years' Labour and Sorrow.

== Weybridge & family ==
He married Kate Glegg (1812–1892), daughter of the late Captain Thomas Glegg of the 17th Light Dragoons and his wife Sophia, on 2 August 1842 at Byfleet in Surrey, with whom he had four children. The family moved to the small town of Weybridge in 1854, having had a large house built for them close to the railway station.

Scott was heavily involved with local matters and purchased at his own expense the plot of land to build a Congregational church for the town, inspired by the idea of evening services for the working classes. The construction of the church was completed in 1865 and still stands today as the Weybridge United Reformed Church. Scott's local collaborator François Baron was ordained as the church's first minister. Scott continued to foster local societies and champion local causes; a schoolroom was built behind the church and for a time free weekly lectures were given at his residence Heath House. In 1863, the Surrey Congregational Union had been established and Scott appointed its first chairman. The family retained strong connections to Weybridge and the Surrey area for at least another two generations.

== Interests ==
Scott was a liveryman with the Worshipful Company of Glovers and the Worshipful Company of Wheelwrights. He served for the Wheelwrights as both clerk and master, as did his brother James Renat Scott FSA, following in the footsteps of their father Benjamin Whinnell Scott who had been clerk of the company for over twenty years.

He was a nonconformist, social reformer and temperance advocate. He worked for the abolition of church rates, the promotion of ragged schools, state education and the preservation of open spaces, in particular the city corporation's purchase of Epping Forest. Towards the endowment of the nonconformist church in Southwark in memory of the Pilgrim Fathers, he had contributed £2,000.

In his spare time Scott lectured to working-class audiences and in December 1851 was the chief promoter of the Working Men's Educational Union, becoming its secretary and assisted by his friend François Baron. The union headquartered itself at 25 King William Street (now William IV Street), just off Trafalgar Square.

He was also a fellow of the Royal Astronomical Society and had an observatory constructed in his house in Weybridge.

== Death ==
Benjamin Scott died on 17 January 1892, it was understood as a result of the influenza pandemic which he had contracted from his wife, who had died just three days earlier. The couple were removed from their home in Stanley Crescent, Notting Hill, and taken for burial in the cemetery at Weybridge. He had continued in his official duties until within a short time of his death.

W. T. Stead described him thus: "...he was heart and soul in the work of moral reform. He was a Liberal of the old school, a true descendant of the men of the Commonwealth, whose ideas he shared and whose faith he cherished... For fifty years, and more, his influence in the administration of London has been reasonable and full of intelligence and justice. He was the grand old man of the municipal life of this country, and there is no one to whom we can compare him left among us".

== Works ==
For the Union he wrote and published:

- The Contents and Teachings of the Catacombs at Rome, being a vindication of Pure and Primitive Christianity (1853).
- The Progress of Locomotion, being two lectures on the advances made in Artificial Locomotion in Great Britain (1854).
- Practical Hints to Unpractised Lecturers to the Working Classes (1858).

Following the Overend & Gurney banking crash he published:

- A Statistical Vindication of the City of London; or Fallacies Exploded and Figures Explained (1867).

His other publications include:

- A Sabbath Wreath. A Thanksgiving Memorial etc. (1856).
- The Revival in Ulster; its Moral and Social Results (1859).
- An Hour with the Pilgrim Fathers and their Precursors. a lecture (1859).
- Lays of the Pilgrim Fathers; compiled in aid of the fund for completing the Memorial Church of the Pilgrim Fathers, in Southwark (1861).
- "What Hath God Wrought!" or, the Ameliorated Condition of the World in Answer to Three Years' Prayer. an address etc. (1863).
- The Pilgrim Fathers; neither Puritans nor Persecutors; a lecture delivered at The Friends' Institute, London (1866).
- Suggestions for a Chamber of Commerce for the City of London (1867).
- Church Finance; a plea for pure Voluntaryism, the only Scriptural and Efficient Source of Church Sustentation etc. (1869).
- Spiritual Life and Power in the Churches; How Shall they be Obtained? a paper read before the Surrey Congregational Union (1873).
- Is London more Immoral than Paris or Brussels? The Question Answered in a letter to a Belgian Gentleman (1881).
- The Municipal Government of London (1882).
- London's Roll of Fame: Being Complimentary Notes and Addresses from the City of London, on Presentation of the Honorary Freedom of that City, and on other occasions... 1757-1884 (in 2 vols, 1884).
- Six Years' Labour and Sorrow (1885)
- State Regulated Vice as it Existed Anciently in London; a paper read before the... British, Continental and General Federation for the Abolition of Government Regulation of Vice (1886).
- A State Iniquity; its Rise, Extension and Overthrow. A Concise History of the System of State Regulated and Licensed Vice (1890).

== See also ==
- City of London Corporation
- Criminal Law Amendment Act 1885
- Freedom of the City of London
- Social purity movement
- Weybridge United Reformed Church
