= Richard Clark (Chamberlain of London) =

English attorney

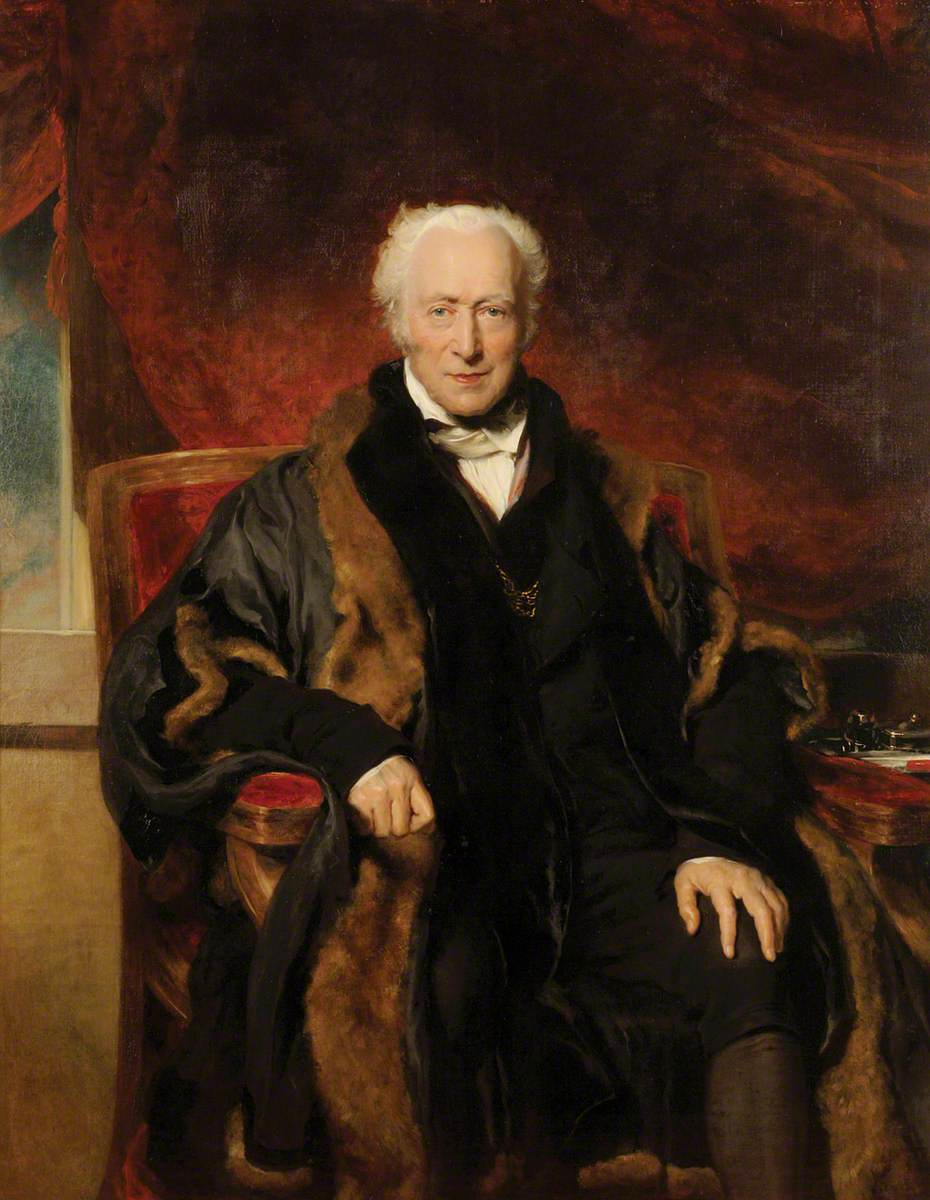
- Clark by Thomas Lawrence
- Born: 1739; St Botolph without Aldgate, England
- Died: 16 January 1831 (aged 91–92); Chertsey, England
- Occupation: Attorney

Richard Clark (1739 – 16 January 1831) was an English attorney who served as the Chamberlain of London and Lord Mayor of London.

== Biography ==
Clark was born in the parish of St Botolph without Aldgate in March 1789. He was admitted an attorney, and obtained a considerable practice in his profession. In 1776 he was elected the alderman of the Broad Street ward on the resignation of Alderman Hopkins, and in the following year served the office of sheriff. At the bye election in September 1781, occasioned by the death of Alderman Hayley, he contested the vacant seat for the city but was defeated by Sir Watkin Lewes, the lord mayor, by 2,685 to 2,387. In 1784 Clark was elected lord mayor, and on 19 May 1785 was appointed president of Christ’s Hospital. On the death of John Wilkes he was elected Chamberlain of London, 2 January 1798. In the same year he resigned his posts of alderman and president of Christ's Hospital, and was appointed president of Bridewell Hospital.

He was fond of mixing in literary society, and in 1785 was elected a fellow of the Society of Antiquaries. At the age of fifteen he was introduced by Sir John Hawkins to Samuel Johnson, whose suppers at the Mitre Tavern in Fleet Street he used frequently to attend. He was also a member of the Essex Head Club, for which he had been proposed by Johnson himself. In 1776 Clarke married Margaret, the daughter of John Pistor, a woollendraper in Aldersgate, by whom he left two sons. In 1774 he purchased the Porch House in Guildford Street, Chertsey, famous as the last residence of Abraham Cowley. Here Clark lived during the latter days of his life. He died at Chertsey on 16 January 1831, in his ninety-second year, having held the post of chamberlain for thirty-three years. His bust, executed by Sievier in 1829, and his portrait, painted by Sir Thomas Lawrence are in the possession of the corporation at Guildhall.

== See also ==
- List of lord mayors of London
