= Old Town Hall, Paignton =

Municipal building in Paignton, Devon, England

Old Town Hall
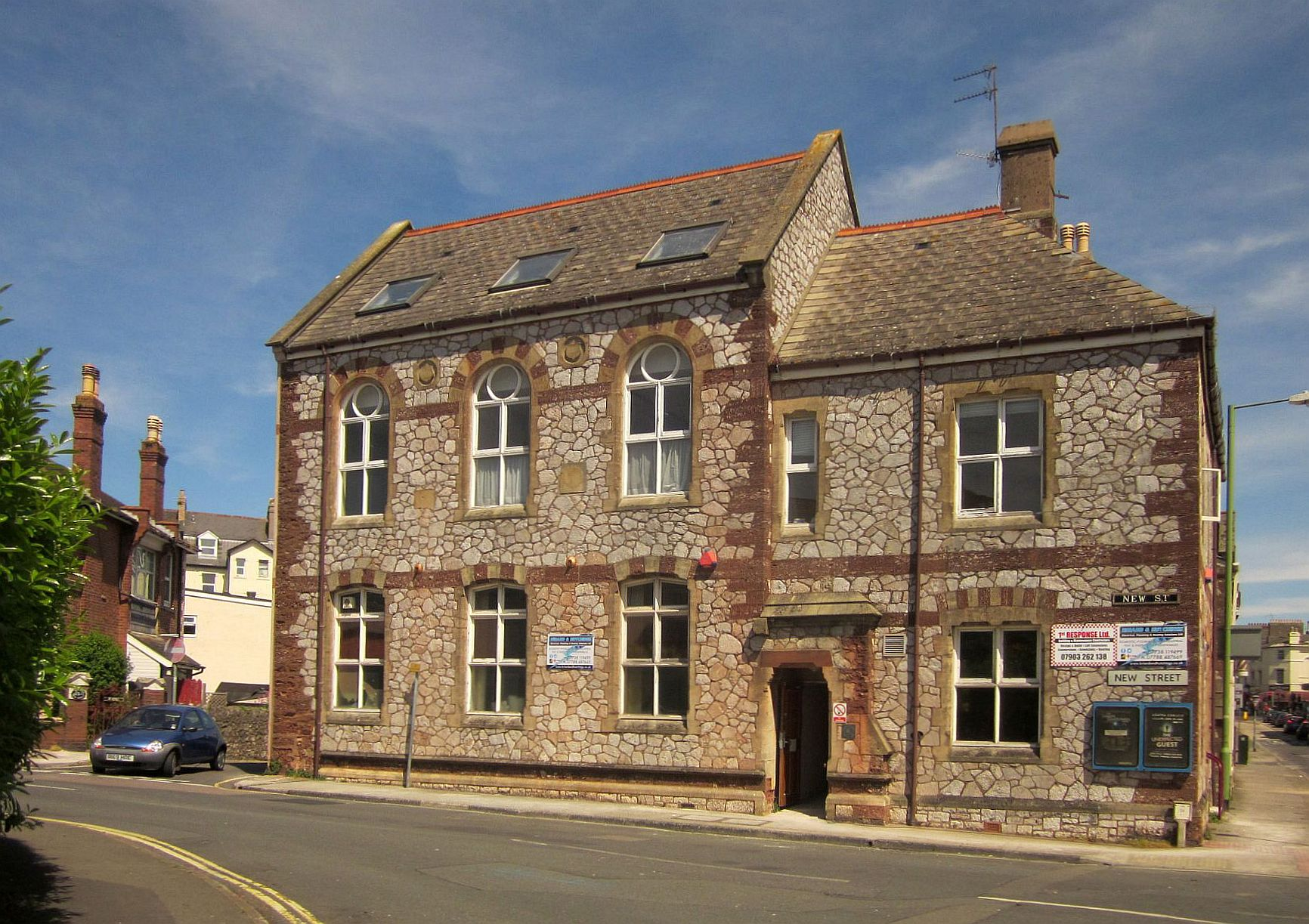
- The building in 2014

- Shown in Devon
- 50.4347°N 3.5687°W
- Location: New Street, Paignton

History
- Built: 1870

Site notes
- Architect: John Tarring
- Architectural style: Italianate style

The Old Town Hall is a former municipal building in New Street in Paignton, a town in Devon, in England. It served as the offices of Paignton Urban District Council until 1946, but was later converted for residential use.

== History ==
Following significant population growth, largely associated with its status as a seaside resort, a local board was formed in Paignton in 1863. In 1867, the local decided to commission a building to serve as a public office, police station, sessions house and assembly room. The site selected was on the north side of New Street. The new building was designed by John Tarring in the Italianate style, built in stone and was completed in 1870. As well as being the location for weekly petty session hearings, the town hall also served as the meeting place for the local masonic lodge.

After the local board was succeeded by Paignton Urban District Council in 1894, the town hall became the offices and meeting place of the new council. During the Second World War, it operated as the local sub-station for the purposes of controlling air raid precautions against German bombing. The town hall continued to serve as the council headquarters for over half a century, but ceased to be the local seat of government when the council relocated to Oldway Mansion in 1946.

As well as being used for municipal purposes it also served as a public events venue: the rock band, the Gods, performed there in November 1967. The town hall was kept in public ownership, serving as the local register office and being used for the provision of local services, including council rent and rates collection, by the urban district council until 1968, and then by Torbay Council thereafter. It remained in public ownership until 2008, when it was deemed surplus to requirements, and sold to a developer for conversion into housing.

== Architecture ==
The building is constructed of grey limestone and red sandstone, with yellow sandstone dressings. The left-hand section of three bays is slightly projected forward from the right-hand section of two bays. The left-hand section, which is also taller than the right-hand section, is fenestrated with segmental-headed windows with multi-coloured sandstone voussoirs on the ground floor, and with round-headed windows with voussoirs on the first floor. The first bay in the right-hand section contains a doorway on the ground floor and a narrow casement window with an architrave on the first floor, while the second bay is fenestrated by a segmental headed casement window with voussoirs on the ground floor and by a square headed casement window with an architrave on the first floor. An attic storey lit by Velux windows has been inserted to create extra space. Internally, the principal room is the former council chamber on the ground floor, behind the segmental-headed windows. Torbay Council has described the building as being part of an "eccentric terrace".
