= Palace Theatre, Paignton =

Theatre in Devon, England

Coordinates: 50°26′06″N 3°34′15″W

Palace Theatre
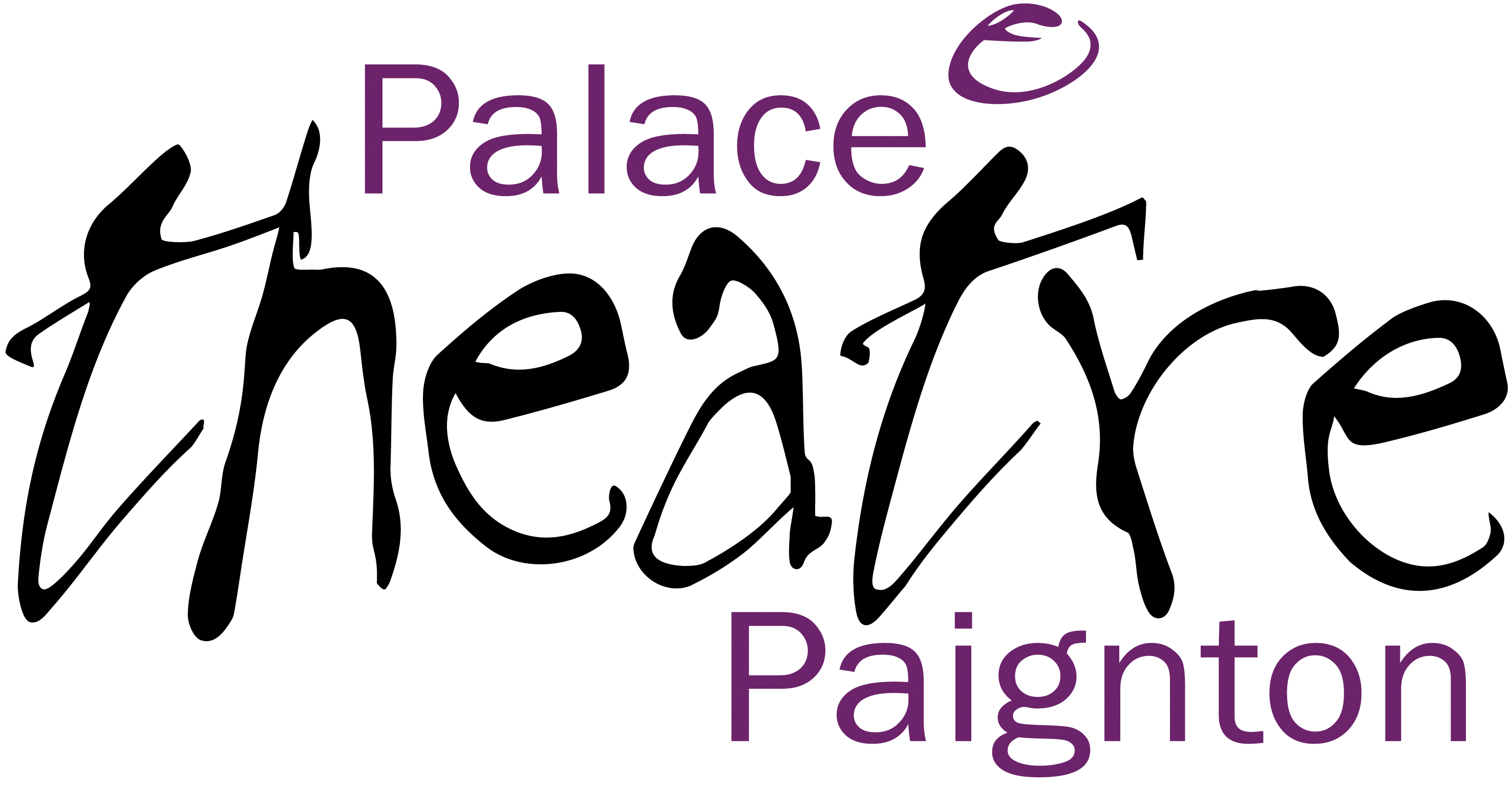
- Logo in 2016

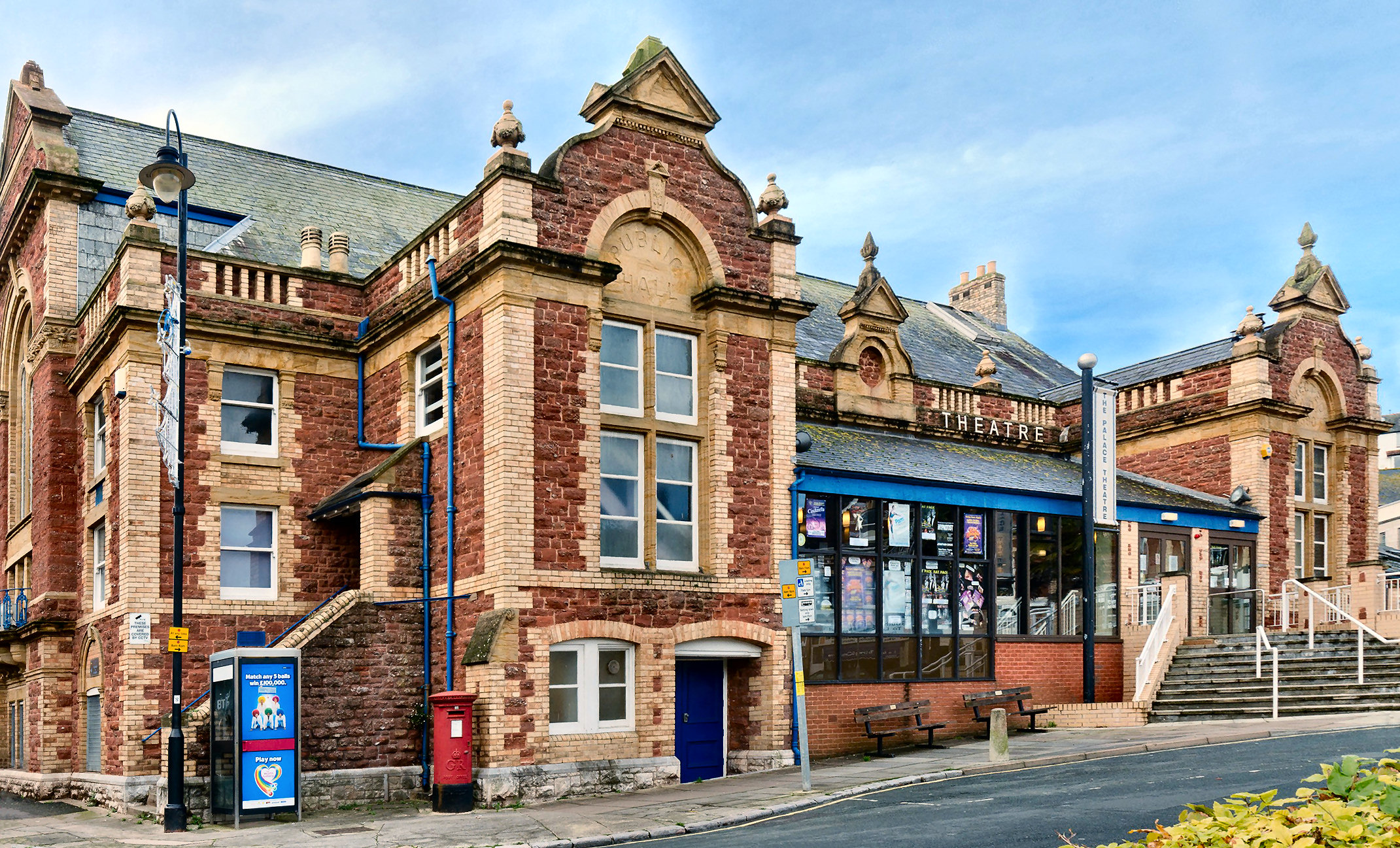
- Palace Theatre in 2016

- Location within Devon

General information
- Type: Theatre
- Location: Palace Avenue, Paignton, TQ3 3HF, Paignton, Devon, England

Website
- www.palacetheatrepaignton.co.uk

The Palace Theatre is a theatre in Paignton, Devon, England. It was built in 1890 and is the oldest working theatre in Torbay. It has been owned by Torbay Council or its predecessor organisations since 1920. The theatre underwent a major refurbishment in 2005 and has a seating capacity of 380. Since 2018, the theatre has been managed and operated by Jazz Hands CIC, a community interest company, created by Maureen McAllister and Deirdre Makepeace.

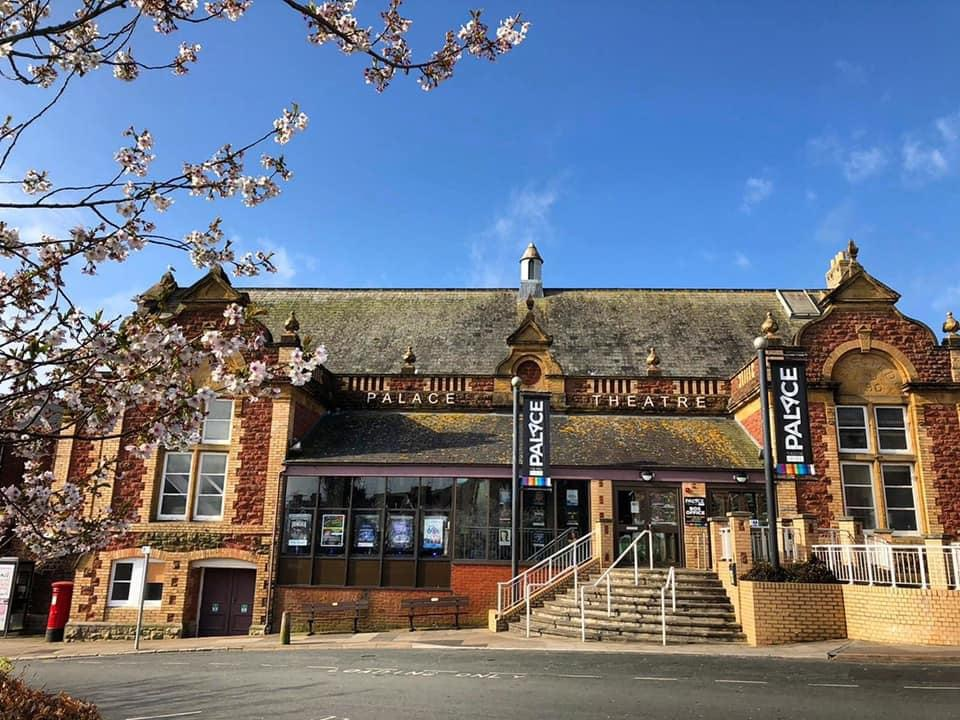
Palace Theatre Paignton operated by Jazz Hands CIC

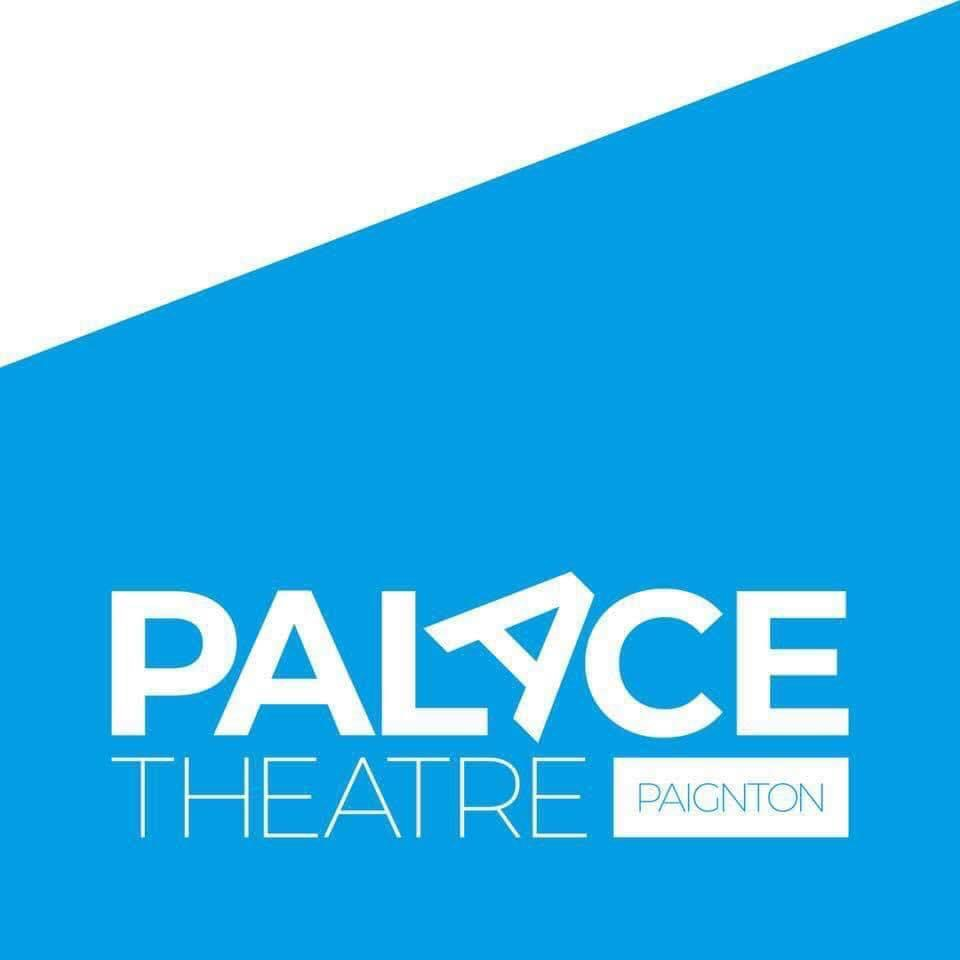
Palace Theatre Paignton new logo 2018

== History ==
The Palace Theatre was originally an 800-seat hall for public use that opened in 1890. It was built by The Public Hall Company under managing director A. W. Axworthy, possibly as a reaction to the success of the small Gerston Theatre which had been opened as part of the Gerston Hotel in 1870 by Arthur Hyde Dendy. In 1919 an American-run film company, named Torquay and Paignton Photo-play Productions planned to buy out the Public Hall Company with the intention of building its film studios on the site of the hall to make "clean pictures for clean-minded people". This did not proceed, however, and the hall was bought by Paignton Council in 1920 after its attempt the year before which had fallen through because a price could not be agreed.

By 1941 the theatre had been renamed as The Garrison Theatre when the Paignton Pantomime Company (formed 1935) presented Aladdin there in that December. That group, now known as Paignton Pantomime Productions, still performs pantomimes in December and January every year. Other groups performing there in the 1940s were the West of England Players, the Torbay Amateur Operatic Society and Herman Darewski and his Orchestra. It was renamed again in 1948 as the "Palace Avenue Theatre" and after refurbishment put on summer shows for several years. The Palace Theatre took over from the Festival Theatre as the main theatre in Paignton in 1998, on the Festival Theatre's conversion to a cinema.

== Today ==
The Friends of the Palace Theatre are 1,000 plus people who care for the Palace Theatre and its future. They support the theatre by raising awareness of its place in the community by promoting its productions and by raising funds for its continual improvement.

Torbay Acting Factory (TAF) is a youth theatre group specialising in theatre, song, dance and acting for young people. Its rehearsals take place in the theatre arena space and their performances take place on the main stage at the venue. TAF was owned and managed by the Palace Theatre until April 2016 when it was taken over by Doorstep Arts Theatre Company which uses the same spaces.

Bijou Theatre Productions, a Theatre Club that has an audience membership, produces four productions at the theatre per year. The aim is to promote good quality drama and provide community theatre. The Robert Owen Foundation operates from within the theatre and is a creative platform for people to express their artistic side. Some of their work is on display in the theatre.
