= English Riviera Airshow =

Annual air show in the United Kingdom

English Riviera Air Show
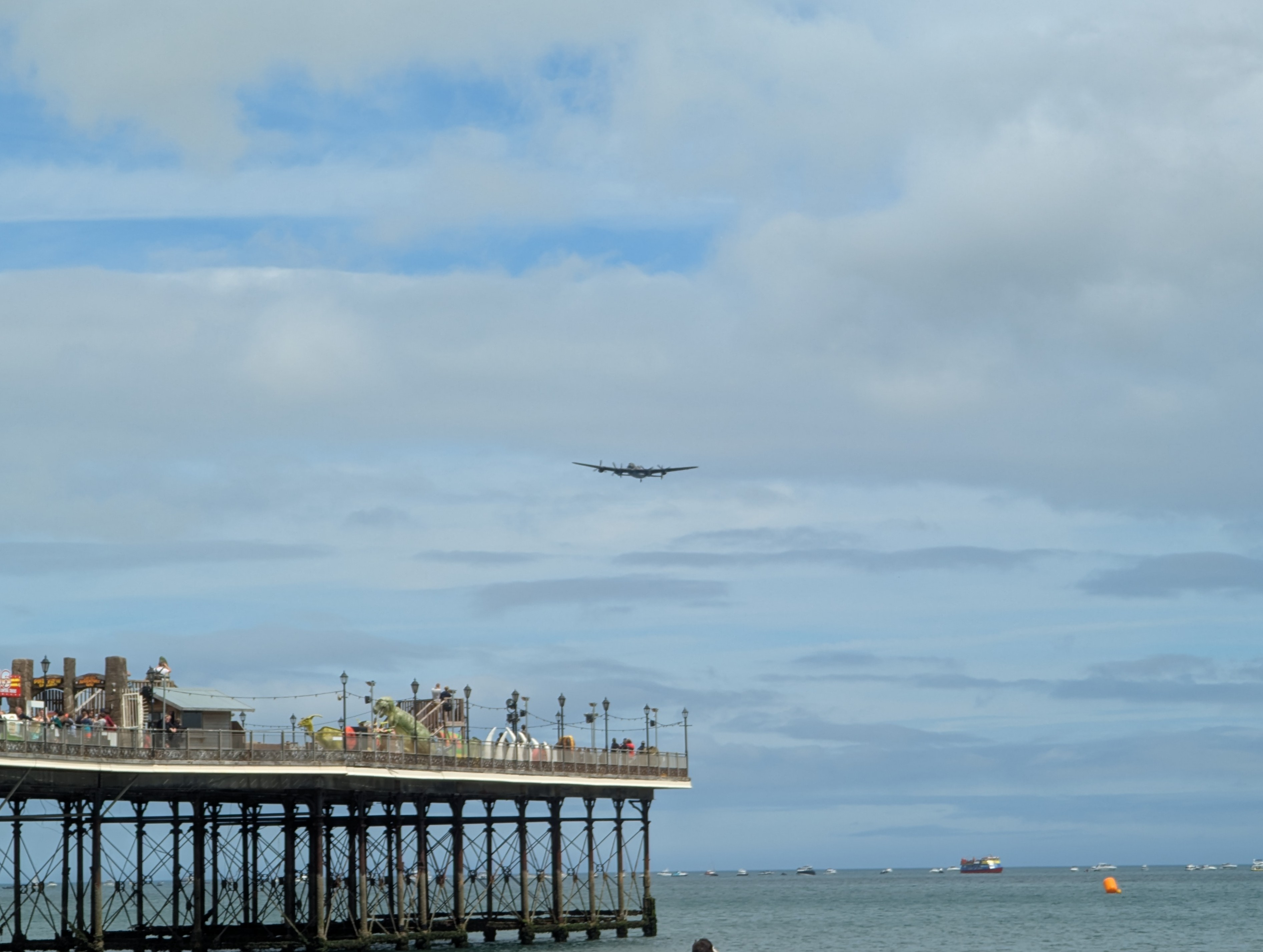
- Torbay Air Show, 2025
- Status: Active
- Genre: Air show
- Dates: 3 days June
- Begins: Friday
- Ends: Sunday
- Frequency: Annually
- Venue: Paignton Sands, Torbay.
- Location: Paignton
- Country: United Kingdom
- Established: 2016
- Previous event: 29-31 May 2026
- Next event: 4-6 June 2027
- Major events: Aerobatic displays
- Organiser: Torbay Council
- Website: englishrivieraairshow.co.uk

The English Riviera Airshow, formerly known as the Torbay airshow, is an annual air show held at the beach of Paignton, in Devon, England. Launched in 2016, it showcases aerial displays over Torbay, featuring performances by the RAF Red Arrows, RAF Typhoon, Battle of Britain Memorial Flight, Royal Navy Black Cats, and the British Army's Red Devils Parachute Display Team.

The event is free to attend and typically occurs in early June, attracting tens of thousands of spectators. Organized by Torbay Council with support from the English Riviera BID Company and local sponsors, the airshow also includes ground-based entertainment such as live music, a funfair, STEM exhibits, and food stalls.

== History ==
The festival started in 2016, being held from 10 June to 12 June 2025.

Year	Dates	Estimated Attendance (all days)	Notes
2016	10–12 June		Highlights included the RAF Typhoon, Sea Vixen, Battle of Britain Memorial Flight, and Red Arrows. The Tigers parachute team and several aerobatic acts also performed.
2017	3–4 June	150,000	
2018	2–3 June	More than 165,000	
2019	1–2 June	165,000	
2022	2–5 June		First display back after an absence due to COVID. Larger event year due to the Platinum Jubilee. Displays were cut short on sunday due to poor visibility.
2023	3–4 June	198,000	
2024	1–2 June		A fatal Spitfire crash in Lincolnshire the previous week led to the cancellation of the planned RAF Battle of Britain Memorial Flight.
2025	30 May–1 June		Strong winds meant there was no performance by the Red Devils Army Parachute Display Team due to safety concerns.
2026	29–31 May	Nearly 200,000	Tenth-anniversary event; Wing Commander Sasha Nash became the first woman to lead the Red Arrows at the event.
