= Chamberlain of London =

Ancient office of the City of London

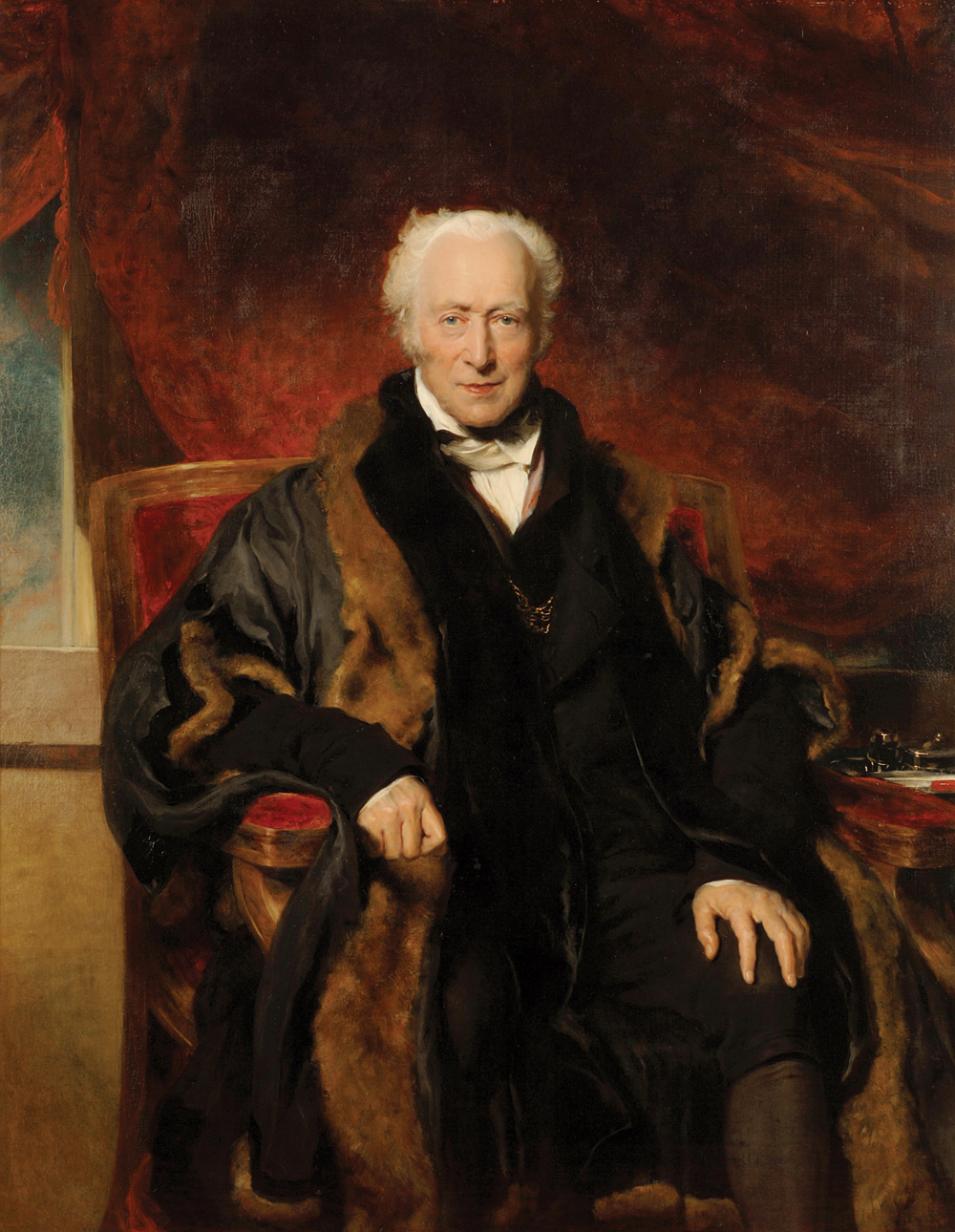
Richard Clark (1739–1831) wearing his black furred robe as chamberlain of the City of London

The chamberlain of the City of London is an ancient office of the City of London, dating back to at least 1237.

The chamberlain is the finance director of the City of London Corporation. The chamberlain is responsible for making arrangements for the investment of City of London and other funds and is one of the three official trustees. The role is assisted by the clerk of the Chamber or Chamberlain's Court, a similarly ancient role. The Lord Mayor of London, elected annually, is the leader of the corporation.

Through the chamberlain's Court they administer the admission to the Freedom of the City and personally admit all honorary freemen. The chamberlain is responsible to the Court of Aldermen for constituting new livery companies and for interpreting and amending their ordinances and charters.

The current holder of the office is Caroline Al-Beyerty, the 81st chamberlain in unbroken succession from 1237 to the present. Mrs Al-Beyerty made history in becoming the first woman to hold this office.

== History ==
The civic chamberlain of London (effectively the corporation's Treasurer) should not be confused with the "King's chamberlain of London" (effectively a royal victualler). Originally responsible for collection and distribution of revenues within the city and nominally appointed by the Crown, the office-holder's term traditionally began on Midsummer Day and cannot be removed "unless some great cause of complaint appear against him".

The chamberlain was responsible for the Chamber of London, the place where various monies of the city were received and stored. The monies were referred to as the City's Cash although there were other funds such as the City Bridge Fund, administered by the Chief Commoner, and later the City Fund, a fund created to handle the rates.

In 1590, the right of the chamberlain to levy local taxes on goods sold within the city was upheld in The Chamberlain of London’s Case as a valid regulatory measure.

The longest-serving chamberlain is Benjamin Scott (1858–1892), closely followed by Richard Clark (1798–1831) and Sir Adrian Pollock (1912–1943), all of whom exceeded tenures of thirty years and died in office.

== Functions ==
The chamberlain acts as the financial adviser, accountant, receiver and paymaster for the City of London and is responsible for the city's local and private trust funds. The chamberlain's relationship with the Court of Common Council is the same that which applies to other local authority chief finance officers (CFOs) and therefore they have the same responsibilities placed upon them as any other CFO in the United Kingdom. The Chamberlain's Department includes departments and teams responsible for the financial and commercial administration of the city.

The office also retains has important ceremonial responsibilities, including administering the creation of Freemen of London.

== Full list of chamberlains ==
- John de Woburne and John Wacher (1237)
- Stephen de Mundene and Hugh Motun (1274–1277)
- Hugh Motun (1277–1285)
- William de Betoyne (1288–1298)
- John de Dunstaple and Simon de Paris (1298–1300)
- Nicholas Pycot (1300–1304)
- Richard Poterel (1304–1310)
- Luke de Haverynge (1310–1311)
- John le Mazeliner (1311–1313)
- John Dode (1313–1318)
- Thomas Prentiz (1318–1320)
- Andrew Horn (1320–1328)
- Henry de Seccheford (1328–1336)
- Thomas de Maryns (1336–1349)
- Thomas de Waldene (1349–1359)
- John de Cantebrigge (1359–1374)
- William de Eynesham (1374–1378)
- John Ussher (1378–1380)
- Richard Odyham (1380–1391)
- Stephen Speleman (1391–1404)
- John Proffyt (1404–1416)
- John Hille (1416–1420)
- John Bederenden (1420–1434)
- John Chicheley (1434–1449)
- John Middleton (1449–1450)
- John Sturgeon (1450–1454)
- Thomas Thornton (1454–1463)
- Robert Colwyche (1463–1474)
- William Philip (1474–1479)
- Miles Adys (1479–1484)
- William Purchas (1484–1492)
- William Milbourne (1492–1506)
- Nicholas Mattok (1506–1517)
- John Barnard (1517–1525)
- John Husee (1525–1532)
- George Medley (1532–1548)
- Thomas Hayes (1548–1550)
- John Sturgeon (1550–1563)
- George Heton (1563–1577)
- John Mabbe (1577–1583)
- Robert Brandon (1583–1591)
- Thomas Wilford (1591–1603)
- Cornelius Fish (1603–1626)
- Robert Bateman (1626–1643)
- Gilbert Harrison (1643–1651)
- Thomas Player Snr (1651–1672)
- Thomas Player Jnr (1672–1683)
- Peter Ayleworth (1683–1684)
- Sir Peter Rich (1684–87; 1688–89; 1691)
- Henry Loades (1687–1688)
- Sir Leonard Robinson (1689–1691; 1691–1696)
- Sir Thomas Cuddon (1696–1702)
- Sir William Fazackerly (1703–1718)
- Sir George Ludlam (1718–1727)
- Samuel Robinson (1728–1734)
- Sir John Bosworth (1734–1751)
- Sir Thomas Harrison (1751–1765)
- Sir Stephen Theodore Janssen (1765–1776)
- Benjamin Hopkins (1776–1779)
- John Wilkes (1779–1797)
- Richard Clark (1798–1831)
- Sir James Shaw (1831–1843)
- Sir William Heygate (1843–1844)
- Anthony Brown (1844–1853)
- Sir John Key (1853–1858)
- Benjamin Scott (1858–1892)
- Sir William Cotton (1892–1902)
- Sir Joseph Dimsdale (1902–1912)
- Sir Adrian Pollock (1912–1943)
- Anthony Pickford (acting 1943–1945)
- Irving Blanchard Gane (1945–1962)
- Ean Kendal Stewart–Smith (1962–1964)
- Charles Richard Whittington (1964–1973)
- John Percival Griggs (1974–1983)
- Bernard Harty (1983–1995; 1996–1999 with joint position of Town Clerk)
- Peter Derrick (2000–2006)
- Christopher Bilsland (2006–2013)
- Dr. Peter Kane (2014–2021)
- Caroline Al-Beyerty 2021–

== See also ==
- Lord Mayor of London
- Sheriff of the City of London
- Town Clerk of London

== Sources ==
- Betty R. Masters, The Chamberlain of the City of London 1237–1987 (The Corporation of London, 1988) (Google – title only). (HathiTrust – search only).
- 'Introduction: The Chamber in the sixteenth century', in B.R. Masters (ed.), Chamber Accounts of the Sixteenth Century, London Record Society 20, (London 1984), pp. xxxii–xxxviii (British History Online accessed 6 August 2015).
- (List of Chamberlains from 1688 to 1765), in J. Noorthouck, 'Addenda: The succession of aldermen from 1689', A New History of London Including Westminster and Southwark (London 1773), pp. 894–97 (British History Online accessed 18 November 2017).
- 'Appendix III: Aldermen who were also chamberlains of the City', in A.P. Beavan, The Aldermen of the City of London Temp. Henry III – 1912 (London 1908/1912), p. lxiv (British History Online, accessed 18 November 2017).
