= Festival Theatre, Paignton =

Former theatre in Devon, England

Coordinates: 50°26′07″N 3°33′35″W

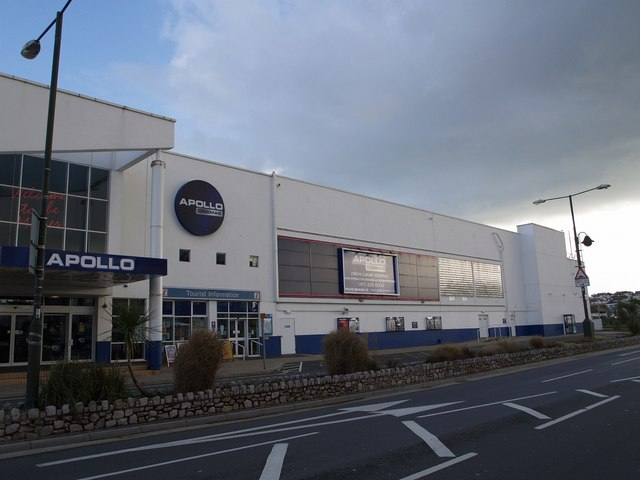
The theatre building in 2007, after its conversion to a cinema

The Festival Theatre was a theatre in Paignton, Devon, England.

Opened in 1967, the Festival Theatre was a seafront theatre located on the Paignton Esplanade, capable of staging large summer shows. It was in direct competition with the Princess and Pavilion theatres in Torquay.

The theatre closed at the end of 1998, and the building re-opened in October 1999 as a multiscreen cinema, known as the Apollo. Since the closure of the Festival Theatre, the Palace Theatre in Palace Avenue, a smaller venue, has taken over as the main theatre in Paignton.

== Summer shows ==
- 1971 - Leslie Crowther, Basil Brush, Larry Grayson, John Hanson
- 1974 - the Black and White Minstrels with Don McClane
- 1975 - Ronnie Corbett, Kenneth McKellar, Keith Harris
- 1976 - Black and White Minstrels with Roy Hudd
- 1977 - Tommy Steele, Cool Breeze, Lennie Bennett
- 1978 - Freddie Starr, Roy Walker, Lyn Paul, Paul Ridgeway, Pamela Davis Dancers
- 1980 - Tom O'Connor
- 1981 - Freddie Starr
- 1981 - Dana; the show transferred from Babbacombe Theatre
- 1982 - Danny La Rue
- 1987 - Michael Barrymore
- 1988 - The Cannon and Ball Show with Allan Stewart, The Three Degrees, Domino, The Mike Ryal Orchestra and The Brian Rogers Dancers
- 1989 - Les Dawson
- 1997 - Bradley Walsh
