= Winnaretta Singer =

American patron of the arts

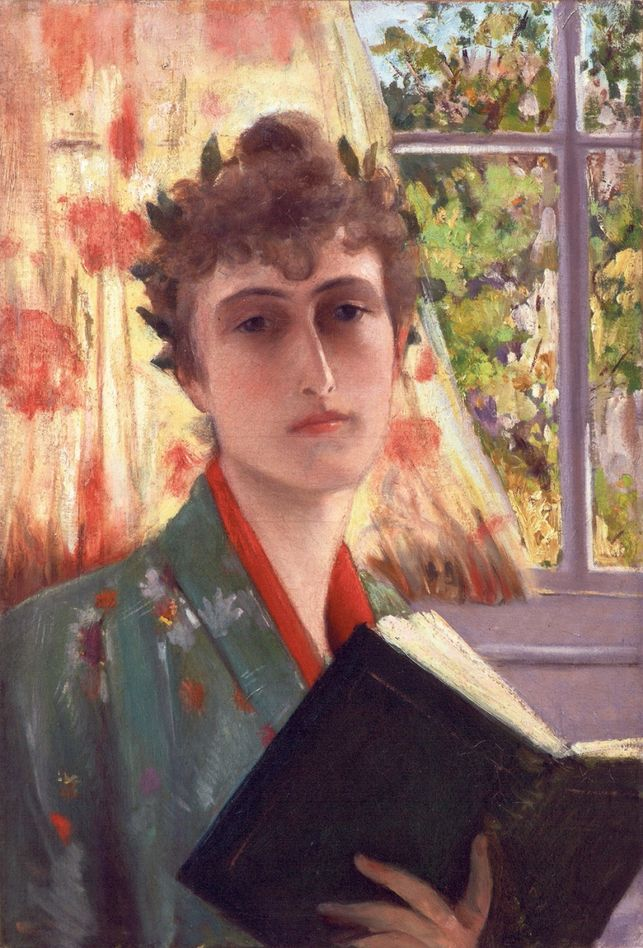
- Self-portrait c.1885
- Born: Winnaretta Eugénie Singer; 8 January 1865; Yonkers, New York, U.S.
- Died: 26 November 1943 (aged 78); London, England
- Spouses: Prince Louis de Scey-Montbéliard (m. 1887; ann. 1892) Prince Edmond de Polignac (m. 1893; died 1901)
- Parents: Isaac Singer; Isabella Eugénie Boyer

Winnaretta Singer (8 January 1865 – 26 November 1943) was an American-born heiress to the Singer sewing machine fortune. She used this to fund a wide range of causes, notably a musical salon where her protégés included Debussy and Ravel, and numerous public health projects in Paris, where she lived most of her life. Singer entered into two marriages that were unconsummated, and openly enjoyed many high-profile relationships with women. She was styled as Countess Louis de Scey-Montbéliard during her first marriage and as Princess Edmond de Polignac following her second marriage in 1893.

== Early life and family ==
Winnaretta Singer was born in Yonkers, New York, the twentieth of the 24 children of Isaac Singer. Her mother was his Parisian-born second wife, Isabella Eugénie Boyer. After the American Civil War, the Singer family moved to Paris, where they remained until the Franco-Prussian War in 1870. The family then settled in England, first in London, and then Paignton, Devon where they moved to Oldway Mansion, a 115-room palace built by her father. After Isaac Singer's death in 1875, Isabella and her children moved back to Paris. In 1879 Isabella remarried; her new husband was a Belgian violinist, Victor-Nicolas Reubsaet. Presumably, he abused Winnaretta; rumors flew about the violence in their house. As soon as she came of age, Winnaretta seized control of her $1 million inheritance and left to live on her own.

=== Relatives ===
Winnaretta's older brother, Adam Mortimer Singer, became one of England's landed gentry. Her younger sister, Isabelle-Blanche (1869–1896) married Jean, duc Decazes. Their daughter, Daisy Fellowes, was raised by Winnaretta after Isabelle-Blanche's death and became a noted socialite, magazine editor, and fashion trendsetter. Winnaretta's younger brother, Paris Singer, was one of the architects and financiers of the resort of Palm Beach, Florida; he had a son by Isadora Duncan. Another brother, Washington Singer, became a substantial donor to the University College of the South West of England, now the University of Exeter; one of the university's buildings is named in his honor.

== Marriages and relationships ==
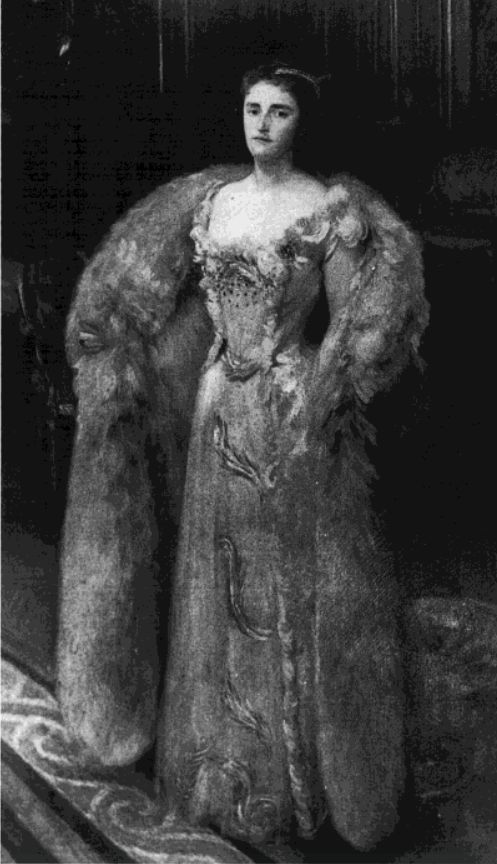
Princesse Louis de Scey-Montbeliard, 1889. By John Singer Sargent (1856–1925).

Although known within private social circles to be a lesbian, Winnaretta married at the age of 22 to Count Louis de Scey-Montbéliard (fr). The marriage was annulled in 1892 by the Catholic church, five years after a wedding night that family stories say included the bride's climbing atop an armoire and threatening to kill the groom if he came near her.

In 1893, at the age of 28, she stepped companionably into an equally chaste marriage with the 59-year-old Prince Edmond de Polignac (1834–1901), a gay amateur composer. Although it was a mariage blanc (unconsummated marriage), or indeed a lavender marriage (a union between a gay man and a lesbian), it was based on profound platonic love, mutual respect, understanding, and artistic friendship, expressed especially through their love of music. The same year, Singer exhibited her work at the Palace of Fine Arts at the World's Columbian Exposition in Chicago, Illinois.

=== Lesbian relationships ===
In the course of her life, Singer had affairs with numerous women, never making attempts to conceal them, and never going for any great length of time without a female lover. She had these affairs during her own marriages and afterwards, and often with other married women. The disgruntled lesser half of one of Singer's lovers once stood outside her Venetian palazzo and issued this challenge: "If you are half the man I think you are, you will come out here and fight me."

Polignac had a relationship with painter Romaine Brooks, which had begun in 1905, and which effectively ended her affair with Olga de Meyer, who was married at the time and whose godfather (and purported biological father) was Edward VII. Composer and conductor Ethel Smyth fell deeply in love with her during their affair. In the early 1920s, Polignac became involved with pianist Renata Borgatti. From 1923 to 1933, her lover was the British socialite and novelist Violet Trefusis, with whom she had a loving but often turbulent relationship. Alvilde Chaplin, the future wife of the author James Lees-Milne, was involved with Polignac from 1938 to 1943; the two women were living together in London at the time of Polignac's death. In addition, she had an affair with Virginia Woolf.

== Patron of the arts ==
In 1894, the Prince and Princesse de Polignac established a salon in Paris in the music room of their mansion on Avenue Henri-Martin. Their niece by marriage, Jeanne de Montagnac, often assisted in hosting the salons. The Polignac salon came to be known as a haven for avant-garde music. First performances of Chabrier, d'Indy, Debussy, Fauré, and Ravel took place in the Polignac salon. The young Ravel dedicated his piano work, Pavane pour une infante défunte, to the Princesse de Polignac. Many of Marcel Proust's evocations of salon culture were born during his attendance at concerts in the Polignac drawing room.

After her husband's death, Winnaretta Singer-Polignac used her fortune to benefit the arts, sciences, and letters. She decided to honor his memory by commissioning several works of the young composers of her time, amongst others Igor Stravinsky's Renard, Erik Satie's Socrate (by her intercession Satie was kept out of jail when he was composing this work), Darius Milhaud's Les Malheurs d'Orphée, Francis Poulenc's Concerto for Two Pianos and Organ Concerto, Jean Françaix's Le Diable boîteux and Sérénade pour douze instruments, Kurt Weill's Second Symphony, and Germaine Tailleferre's First Piano Concerto. Manuel de Falla's El retablo de maese Pedro was premiered there, with the harpsichord part performed by Wanda Landowska.

In addition to Proust and Antonio de La Gándara, the Princesse de Polignac's salon was frequented by Isadora Duncan, Jean Cocteau, Marguerite de Saint-Marceaux, Claude Monet, Sergei Diaghilev, and Colette. She helped Diaghilev with his Ballets Russes on multiple occasions and financially supported the company. She was also patron to many others, including Nadia Boulanger, Clara Haskil, Dinu Lipatti, Arthur Rubinstein, Vladimir Horowitz, Armande de Polignac, Loie Fuller, Ethel Smyth, Le Corbusier, Adela Maddison, the Ballets Russes, l'Opéra de Paris, and the Orchestre Symphonique de Paris. In addition to performing as pianist and organist in her own salon, she was an accomplished painter who exhibited in the Académie des Beaux-Arts and in the 1906 International Society of Sculptors, Painters and Gravers. One canvas eventually appeared in the showcase of an art gallery, advertised as being a Manet.

== Public service ==
Winnaretta Singer-Polignac was also an important leader in the development of public housing in Paris. Her 1911 building of a housing project for the working poor at Rue de la Colonie, in the 13th arrondissement, was considered to be a model for future projects. In the 1920s and 1930s, Singer commissioned the architect Le Corbusier to rebuild or construct several public shelters for Paris's Salvation Army. The plans of Le Corbusier's Salvation Army hostel in Paris show a private apartment at the top floor for "Miss Singer". With her friend Madeleine Zillhardt, she bought the barge 'Louise-Catherine' named in memory of Zillhardt's companion Louise Catherine Breslau. The boat was rehabilitated by Le Corbusier in 1929 in order to be a refuge of the Salvation Army for the homeless in winter and a summer camp for children, moored in Paris on the banks of the Seine, at the Pont des Arts and at the Pont d'Austerlitz.

During World War I, working with Marie Curie, Singer-Polignac helped convert private limousines into mobile radiology units to help wounded soldiers at the front.

During the inter-war period, Singer-Polignac worked with Consuelo Vanderbilt Balsan and assisted in the construction of a 360-bed hospital destined to provide medical care to middle-class workers. The result of this effort is the Foch Hospital, located in Suresnes, a suburb of Paris, France. The hospital also includes a school of nursing and is one of the top-ranked hospitals in France, especially for renal transplants. It has remained true to its origins and stayed a private not-for-profit institution that still serves the Paris community. It is managed by the Fondation médicale Franco-américaine du Mont-Valérien, commonly called Fondation Foch.

== Fondation Singer-Polignac ==
After Singer-Polignac's death, her legacy of enlightened generosity was carried on through the work of the Fondation Singer-Polignac. Created in 1928, the goals of the foundation are the promotion, through gifts and bourses, of science, literature, the arts, culture, and French philanthropy. The Foundation continued to present concerts and recitals in the Polignac mansion's music room. The performances were first organized by Nadia Boulanger, who presented programs that juxtaposed early music and modern compositions. After Boulanger's death in 1979, the composer Jean Françaix took over the organization of the concert series.

== Sources ==
- Kahan, Sylvia. Winnaretta Singer-Polignac : Princesse, mécène et musicienne. Dijon: les presses du réel, 2018. ISBN 978-2-84066-268-6.
- Kahan, Sylvia (2009). In Search of New Scales: Edmond de Polignac, Octatonic Explorer. Rochester: University of Rochester Press. ISBN 978-1-58046-305-8.
- Kahan, Sylvia. Music's Modern Muse: A Life of Winnaretta Singer, Princesse de Polignac. Rochester: University of Rochester Press, 2003, 2006, 2009. ISBN 1-58046-133-6.
- Kahan, Sylvia. "'Rien de la tonalité usuelle: Edmond de Polignac and the Octatonic Scale in Nineteenth-Century France". 19th-Century Music 29 (2005): 97–120.
- Kahan, Sylvia, and Nathalie Mauriac-Dyer, "Quatre Lettres inédites de Proust au Prince de Polignac", Bulletin Marcel Proust 53 (December 2003): 9–21.
- Michael de Cossart, Food of Love: Princesse Edmond de Polignac (1865–1943) and her Salon, Hamish Hamilton, 1978. ISBN 0-241-89785-8
- James Ross, "Music in the French Salon"; in Caroline Potter and Richard Langham Smith (eds.), French Music Since Berlioz (Ashgate Press, 2006), pp. 91–115. ISBN 0-7546-0282-6.
- Scheijen, S. (2009). Diaghilev: A Life. London: Profile Books. pp. 151–152. ISBN 9780199751495.
