= Prince Edmond de Polignac =

French aristocrat and composer

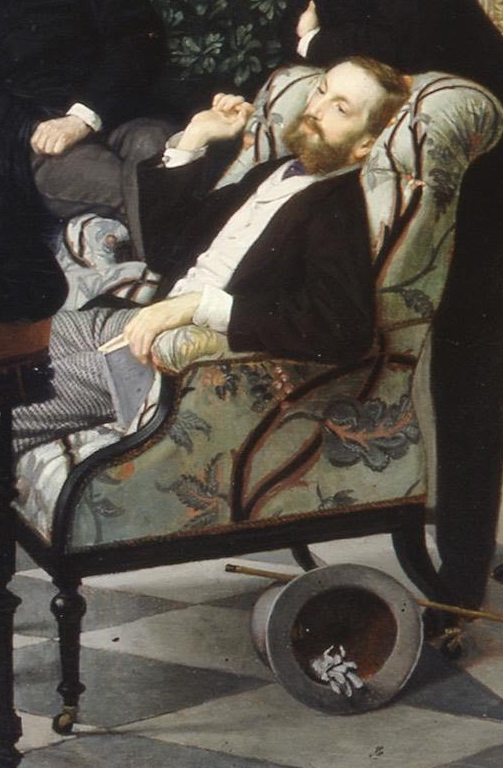
- Prince Edmond de Polignac by James Tissot, 1868
- Born: Prince Edmond Melchior Jean Marie de Polignac; 19 April 1834; Paris
- Died: 8 August 1901 (aged 67); Paris
- Buried: Singer crypt in Torquay
- Noble family: Polignac family
- Spouse: Winnaretta Singer
- Father: Prince Jules de Polignac, 3rd Duke of Polignac
- Mother: Maria Charlotte Parkyns
- Occupation: Composer

Prince Edmond Melchior Jean Marie de Polignac (19 April 1834 – 8 August 1901) was a French aristocrat and composer.

== Ancestry ==
Edmond was a member of the Polignac family, one of the more illustrious families of France. His grandmother, the duchesse de Polignac, had been the close friend of Queen Marie Antoinette.

His father, Jules de Polignac, prince de Polignac (1780–1847), was the Minister of State in the Restoration government of King Charles X and the author of the July Ordinances in 1830, which revoked the Constitution, suspended freedom of the press, and gave the king extraordinary powers, including absolute power in the name of "insuring the safety of the state".

The document resulted in the development of an insurgency and resulted in the "July Revolution" that ended the reign of the Bourbons. The king and his family went into exile, and his cabinet members were tried. Jules de Polignac was captured, tried, convicted and condemned in December 1830 to la mort civile: life imprisonment and a complete loss of civil rights. He was incarcerated in the Château de Ham.

== Early life ==
By the time of his imprisonment Edmond's father Jules de Polignac had two sons by his second wife, Mary Charlotte Parkyns (1792–1864), and a daughter was born as he began his sentence. Despite the harsh sentence, visitation was allowed, and two more sons were born to Jules while he was imprisoned. Edmond was his last child, born in Paris on 19 April 1834.

As his father was legally non-existent, Edmond was listed on his birth certificate as the son of 'the Prince called Marquis de Chalançon, presently on a trip'. In 1836, King Louis-Philippe granted a petition for the release of the imprisoned cabinet members on the grounds of their declining physical condition. Jules was released from jail but had to leave Paris permanently. The family moved to Bavaria, near Landau, where Jules was granted a second princely title by King Ludwig I of Bavaria, and built a château named "Wildthurn".

Edmond received a classical education there, including instruction in Greek, Latin, modern languages, dancing and horseback riding. English, French and German were all spoken regularly in the household. Early on, Edmond demonstrated an inclination toward performance and the creative arts, writing plays and comedies for the children's theatre built by his father. His elder brothers mocked him for his frailness and his lack of athleticism; as a sort of recompense, his parents permitted him to take lessons in piano and music theory.

In November 1845, the family returned to France, moving to Saint-Germain-en-Laye. Two years later, on 30 March 1847, Jules de Polignac died. The remaining family moved to Paris in the rue de Berri, and Edmond continued his education with a preceptor in the Faubourg Saint-Germain. Edmond by now had determined that he would be a composer, though this dismayed his mother, who felt music was an acceptable hobby for an aristocrat, but not an acceptable profession.

== Musical education ==
Alphonse Thys was engaged to teach Edmond counterpoint, composition, and solfège. He entered the Conservatoire de Paris and studied harmony under Napoléon Henri Reber. His pre-existing frailty, the rigours of the conservatory curriculum, his chronic gastrointestinal problem and the internal pressures of his concealed and perhaps mistrusted homosexuality led to periods of great musical productivity alternating with stretches of illness and inactivity.

In 1860, Alfred Beaumont, director of the Opéra-Comique, asked Edmond to supply the music for a libretto by Roger de Beauvoir. He composed an opéra bouffe, Un baiser de duchesse, but Beaumont left the Opéra-Comique before it could be produced. Depression and family pressure to marry ensued.

== Artist circle ==
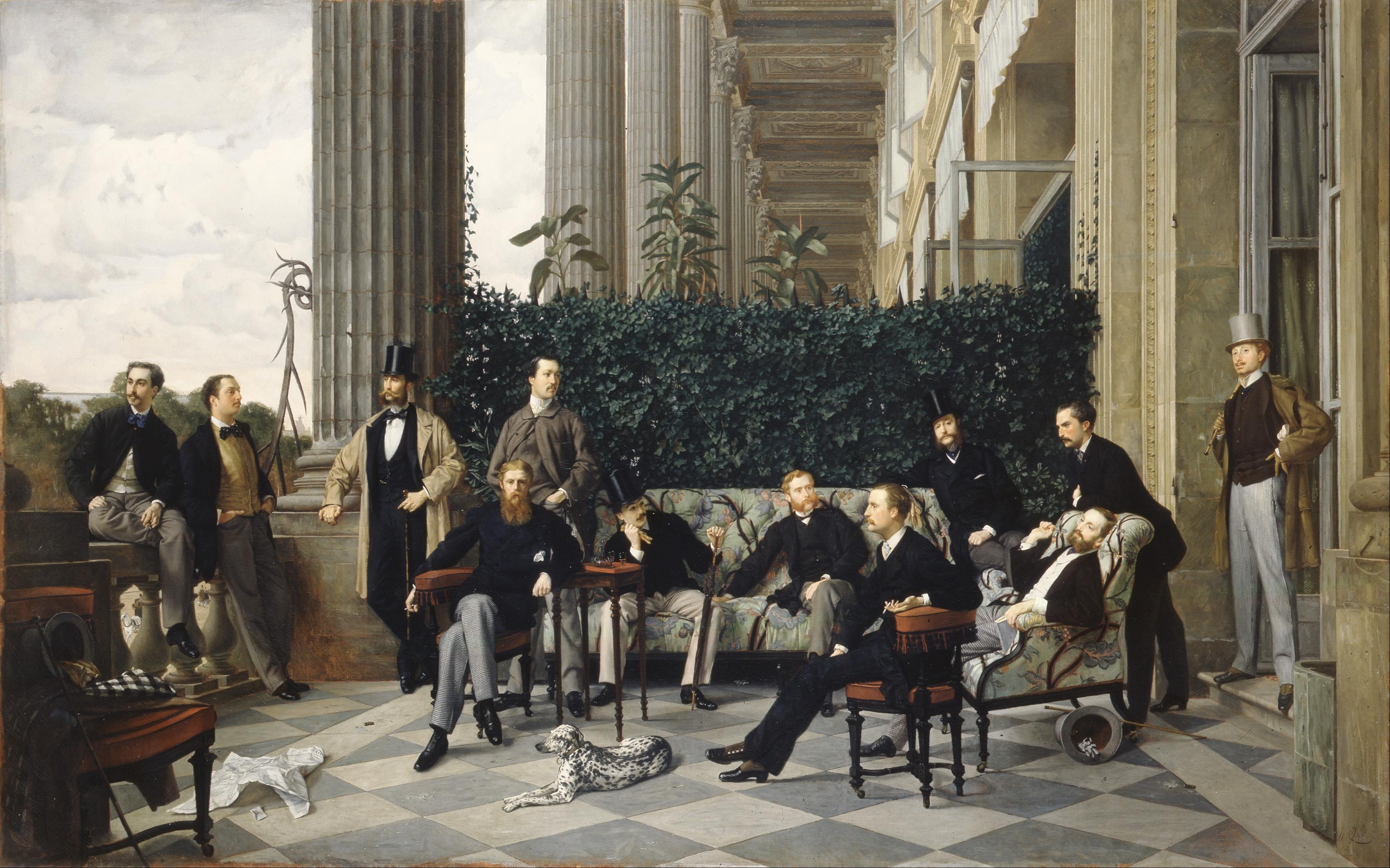
Le Balcon du Cercle de la rue Royale by Tissot, 1868

In 1861, Edmond and his brother Alphonse were founding members of the Cercle de l'Union Artistique, formed to promote performances of great music in venues other than theatres. Besides the aristocrats, the club included Gounod, Berlioz, Auber, and Catulle Mendès. The Cercle supported Wagner after Tannhäuser's resounding failure in its 1861 Paris Opera debut.

Edmond began writing for the amateur male choruses (orphéons) which had begun to proliferate in France, revealing a gift for choral composition, and winning first prizes in competitions for orpheonic works in 1865 and 1867. He also began to write for chamber ensembles. Opera, though, was the path to fame, and when the Ministry of Fine Arts mounted a contest in conjunction with the World's Fair in August 1867 for a new opera on the libretto La coupe du roi de Thulé, Edmond and forty-one other composers, entered. The winner, Eugène-Émile Diaz de la Péna, was a student of the chairman of the judging jury. The losers included Jules Massenet in second place and Georges Bizet in seventh place. Edmond's score, ranked fifth, had been rated lowly because its orchestration - calling for two bass clarinets - was considered horribly complicated.

Edmond joined other clubs for their social status: the Jockey Club, the most exclusive, and the Cercle de la rue Royale, a venue for idling, smoking cigars, discussing politics and the stock market. The indolence of the Cercle de la rue Royale, and of Edmond, was caught in James Tissot's 1868 painting Le Balcon du Cercle de la rue Royale. He buried himself in mystic obsessions and enthusiasms.

== Male friendships ==
In 1875, a new friend entered his life, Comte Robert de Montesquiou, a beautiful and intelligent man twenty-one years his junior. They shared many interests, and it is possible they began a sexual relationship at that time. In his later years, Montesquiou used his wit to shield himself from sincere emotion. He is remembered as a model for two fictional characters: Jean des Esseintes in Joris-Karl Huysmans' À rebours, and the Baron de Charlus in Marcel Proust's À la recherche du temps perdu. Through Montesquiou's circle, Polignac made the acquaintance of Élisabeth, comtesse Greffulhe and of Gabriel Fauré, and he became a member of the Société Nationale de Musique, where his compositions were performed alongside those of Chausson, Debussy, and Fauré.

In 1879, Polignac independently "discovered" the octatonic scale, which had been used in Russian folk music for centuries. He used it for his three-part Passion oratorio, Échos de l'Orient judaïque, and in his incidental music for Salammbô. The works, though played, proved puzzling to audiences and critics.

== Winnaretta Singer ==
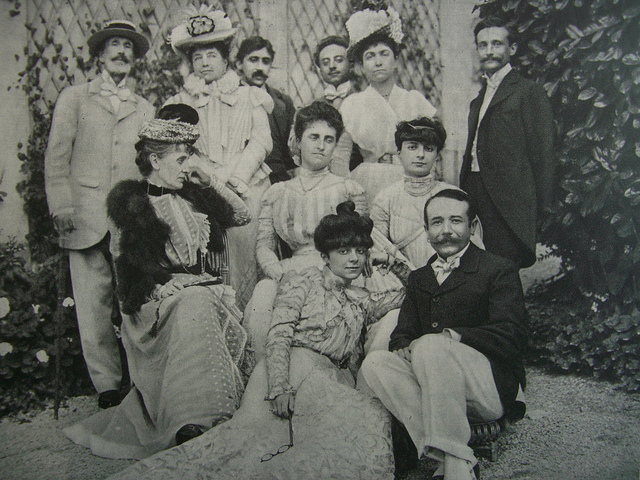
From left to right, standing: Prince Edmond de Polignac, Princess of Brancovan, Marcel Proust, Prince Constantin Brancoveanu (brother of Anna de Noailles), and Léon Delafosse. 2nd row: Madame de Montgenard, Princesse de Polignac, Countess Anna de Noailles, 1st row: Princess Helen Caraman-Chimay (sister of Anna de Noailles), Abel Hermant

By 1892, Polignac, aged 57, inept with money and impoverished through bad investments in a series of get-rich-quick schemes, was destitute; his nephews helped him with loans but noted that desperate action was needed. The solution that they suggested was marriage to a woman of appropriate means. Polignac discussed the matter with Montesquiou, who in turn discussed it with his cousin Élisabeth Greffulhe, and out of these conversations the name of Winnaretta Singer, daughter of Isaac Singer, the sewing machine tycoon, arose. Her marriage to Prince Louis de Scey-Montbéliard had lately been annulled. Her social status could be improved by marrying a prince, even a poor one. And the arrangement would have other benefits: Polignac's homosexuality would not be an issue as Winnaretta was a lesbian. She was intimately interested in music, however, something the two did have in common. Polignac asked the comtesse Greffulhe to sound out Madame Singer on the subject of a mariage blanc (unconsummated marriage) in which each partner would have their own bed but would share artistic interests. Montesquiou, who collaborated with Winnaretta on some artistic projects, asked her to speak with Madame Greffulhe, and there the arguments were reviewed; her social position, compromised by divorce, would be improved by an alliance with one of the oldest and most distinguished aristocratic families in France; with the thirty-one year age difference, and the predilections of the bride and groom, Winnaretta would be free to lead her personal life as she wished, with no sexual demands from Edmond.

The advantages clear, a friendship and affection grew. In November 1893, Edmond proposed marriage to Winnaretta, and she accepted, a year after the idea had first been broached. On 15 December 1893, the couple was married by the Abbé de Broglie in the Chapelle des Carmes in Paris. The union received the blessing of Pope Leo XIII. Montesquiou, who felt Edmond owed him a debt of gratitude for effecting this marriage of convenience, felt slighted when Edmond was not sufficiently effulgent, and the friendship was irrevocably broken.

The marriage freed Edmond to create, and Winnaretta was happy to promote his creations. The happier they became, the more scurrilous the stories Montesquieu would spread about them. Winnaretta became close with Edmond's niece, Armande de Polignac, who was also a composer and musician. Winnaretta became a patron in public musical circles. With her husband, she hosted a music salon in her renovated atelier. With a vaulted two story ceiling, 12 x 10 m, and housing a Cavaillé-Coll organ and two grand pianos, the room became a haven for Paris's musical and artistic avant-garde.

On Tuesdays, her organ evenings were especially sought after and featured the great performers of the day, including Charles-Marie Widor, Eugène Gigout, Louis Vierne, Alexandre Guilmant and Gabriel Fauré. In 1894, Marcel Proust was introduced to the Polignacs through Montesquiou; as of 1895, he was a regular in the Polignac salon, often attending in the company of his current love interest and mutual friend of the Polignacs, composer Reynaldo Hahn. Much of Proust's musical "education" took place in the Polignac salon, and his letters to Edmond de Polignac reveal a profound admiration of the prince's music.

In 1894, Winnaretta produced a performance of Edmond's octatonic compositions at a charity event for the benefit of an orphanage. In 1901, she mounted another "all-Polignac" concert at the Conservatoire.

Through his friendship with Vincent d'Indy, Edmond became involved with the founding of the Schola Cantorum de Paris. Armande was among the school's first students.

During the Dreyfus Affair in 1894, Edmond and his brother Camille were staunchly pro-Dreyfus, but most of the rest of the Polignacs and a remarkable number of musicians were anti-Dreyfus.

The time remaining to the couple's marriage was spent in touring Europe, acquiring a palazzo in Venice and promoting Edmond's compositions. Shortly before his death, Polignac collaborated with the dancer Isadora Duncan.

== Death and legacy ==
He died of a febrile illness, on 8 August 1901. He was interred in the Singer crypt in Torquay. On his tomb is inscribed 'Edmond-Melchior-Jean-Marie, Prince de Polignac, Born 1834, Died 1901, Composer of Music'.

The Princesse de Polignac now became an important musical patron in her own right. She established a prize in music in her husband's name, and commissioned Igor Stravinsky's Renard, Manuel de Falla's El retablo de maese Pedro, Erik Satie's Socrate, Francis Poulenc's Concerto for Two Pianos and Orchestra and Organ Concerto (Poulenc), and Germaine Tailleferre's Piano Concerto. She also subsidized individuals and organizations, such as Nadia Boulanger, Clara Haskil, Arthur Rubinstein, Vladimir Horowitz, Ethel Smyth, Adela Maddison, the Ballets Russes, the Paris Opera and the Orchestre Symphonique de Paris. Until 1939, the Polignac salon was the foremost gathering-place for the artistic elite in Paris and Venice, including Jean Cocteau, Claude Monet, Sergei Diaghilev and Colette.
