= George Soudon Bridgman =

British architect and civil engineer (1839–1925)

- Born: 1839
- Died: 3 April 1925 (aged 85–86)
- Occupation: Architect
- Children: Norman George Bridgman.
- Buildings: Oldway Mansion, Paignton Pier

George Soudon Bridgman (1839–1925) was a British architect and civil engineer, active in the late 19th century in Torquay, Devon. He is best known for his work in the seaside resort of Paignton, designing Oldway Mansion and Paignton Pier, as well as designing the sea wall and promenade at Paignton Beach. He became known among locals as 'the Father of Paignton'.

== Life ==
Bridgman was born in 1839. His brothers were Albert Bridgman and Henry Hewitt Bridgman. For his studies, George Bridgman moved from Torquay to London, until he returned in 1864 to work at Harvey Brothers (Builders) in Torquay. Once qualified he set up his own practice in Paignton and became a master mason.

Bridgman apprenticed Frank Matcham when the latter was aged 14. Matcham worked with Bridgeman until the 1870s before moving to London to join the practice of Jethro Thomas Robinson.

Bridgeman was a freemason who gave a site for new lodge premises in Paignton and laid the foundation stone along with the secretary of the lodge on 15 April 1891.

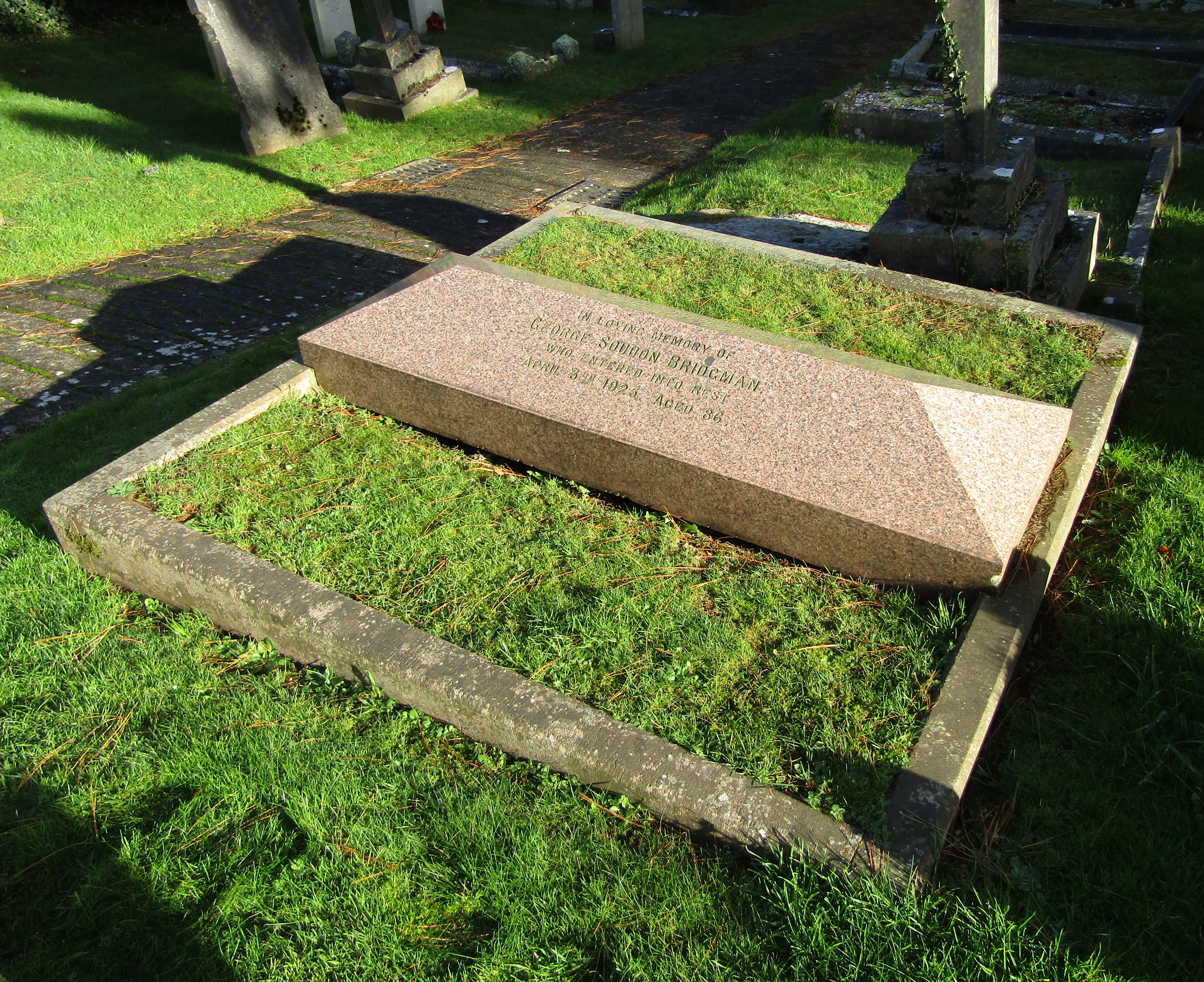
Grave of George Soudon Bridgman.

George Soudon Bridgman died age 86 on 3 April 1925. He was buried in Paignton Municipal Cemetery.

== Work ==
=== Oldway Mansion ===
Around 1871 Bridgman was commissioned by Isaac Merrit Singer, the founder of the Singer Sewing Machine Company, to construct Oldway Mansion. As well as the mansion, Bridgeman designed a circular riding pavilion, later to be termed 'The Wigwam', by Singer. Singer wanted a theatre in the house and in 1873 Frank Matcham was named in the request for tender section as being the accepted party to work alongside Bridgeman on this aspect of the Oldway Mansion project.

=== Paignton Pier ===
Bridgman was commissioned by a local Paignton barrister, Arthur Hyde Dendy, to design a pier for the town. The construction was begun in 1878 to his design, and the pier opened in 1879. It remains standing to this day, and continues to be popular with both locals and visitors to the resort.

=== St Marychurch Town Hall ===
In 1866, Bridgman received a prize of £25 for his design for St Marychurch Town Hall. The hall cost £2,718 to build and opened in November 1883. It was sold to a developer in 2005 and subsequently converted into flats.

== Personal life ==
Bridgman married Miss E Norman (d. 28 March 1900) in 1863, setting up home at Courtland Road in Paignton. They had eight children, including Norman George Bridgman (b. 1869) who also became an architect.

Following his first wife's death, Bridgman married Eliza (Lizzie) Black, and they moved back to Torquay in January 1902 where they lived until his death.

== Commemoration ==
Bridgman's name appears on three blue plaques in Paignton.
