= Isabella Eugénie Boyer =

French-American model and heiress (1841-1904)

- Duchess of Camposelice
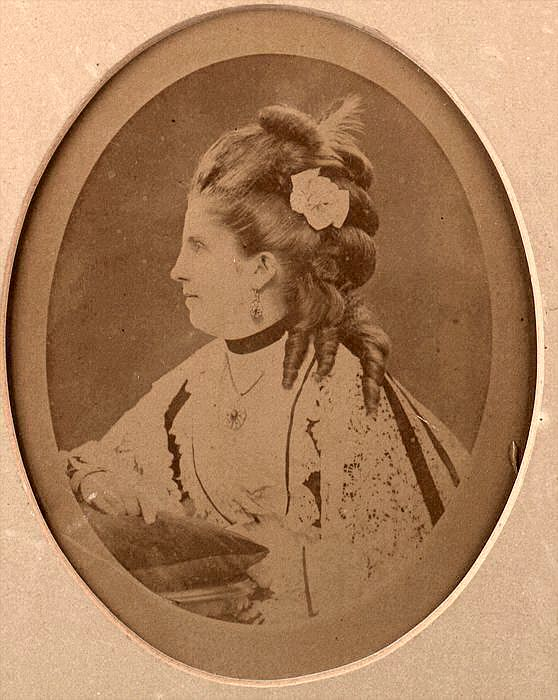
- Born: 17 December 1841; Paris, France
- Died: 12 May 1904 (aged 62); Paris, France
- Spouse(s): Isaac Singer (m. 1863; died 1875) Victor Reubsaet (m. 1879; died 1887) Paul Sohège (m. 1891)
- Issue: Adam Mortimer Singer; Winnaretta Singer; Washington Singer; Paris Singer; Isabelle-Blanche Singer; Franklin Merritt Morse Singer
- Father: Louis Noël Boyer
- Mother: Pamela Lockwood

Isabella Eugénie Boyer (17 December 1841 – 12 May 1904) was a French-American model and heiress.

== Biography ==
Boyer was born in Paris to Louis Noël Boyer, a French confectioner, and his English-born wife Pamela Lockwood (also known as 'Pamilla'). In 1863 in New York City, she married Isaac Merritt Singer, the founder of the Singer sewing machine company, when Singer was 52 and Isabella was only 22. Singer had a previous common-law wife, Mary Ann Sponsler, who had Isaac arrested for bigamy.

Isabella and Isaac moved to Paris, then to Oldway Mansion in Paignton, on the Devon coast in England, because New York society frowned on his many "families." They had six children: Sir Adam Mortimer Singer (1863–1929), Winnaretta Eugénie Singer (1865–1943), Washington Merritt Grant Singer (1866–1934), Paris Eugene Singer (1867–1932), Isabelle-Blanche Singer (1869–1896) and Franklin Merritt Morse Singer (1870–1939).

Isaac Singer is reported to have had a total of 22 children with his many paramours. Singer died in 1875 and left an estate of about $14 million. His two wills created family tension and lawsuits. Isabella was declared his legal widow.

On 8 January 1879, Isabella married the Dutch musician Victor Reubsaet and settled in Paris. Reubsaet was an internationally successful singer and violinist who was born in 1843 in Sittard (Limburg), as Nicolas Reubsaet, the son of a shoemaker. Pretending to be of noble descent, he falsely claimed the title Vicomte d’Estenburgh. In 1881, he did obtain the title of Duke of Camposelice from Italian King Umberto I, in appreciation for a generous act of philanthropy in favor of the Italian colonies.

Boyer, now the Duchess of Camposelice, was still a striking lady when she met the sculptor Bartholdi. Internet rumours have suggested she was his model for the Statue of Liberty, though this claim was rated "false" by Reuters.

Reubsaet died in September 1887 and Isabella was married, for the third time, in December 1891, to the art collector Paul Sohège.

Boyer died on 12 May 1904 in Paris, aged 62. She is buried in Passy Cemetery.
