= Mortimer Singer =

Anglo-American landowner, philanthropist and sportsman

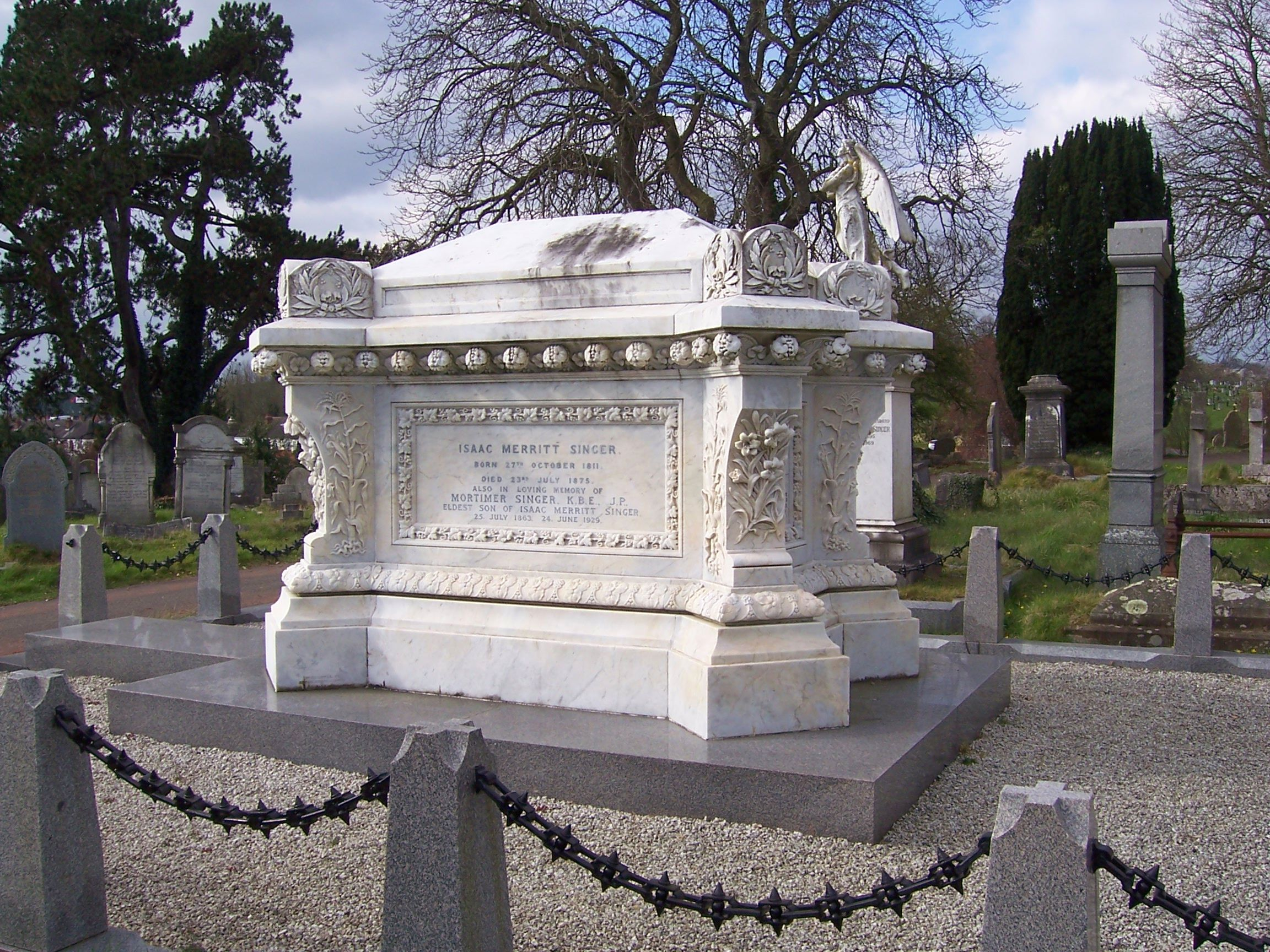
Singer family monument in Torquay Cemetery

Sir Adam Mortimer Singer, KBE, JP (25 July 1863 – 24 June 1929) was an Anglo-American landowner, philanthropist, and sportsman. He was one of the earliest pilots in both France and the United Kingdom.

== Childhood and family ==
Singer was born in 1863 in Yonkers, New York, to Isaac Singer, the founder of the Singer Sewing Machine Company, and his wife Isabella Eugénie Boyer, a French model. He was the couple's first child, though Isaac had at least eighteen children by several previous wives and mistresses. Shortly after his birth, his parents moved from New York to Paris, and then, following the outbreak of the Franco-Prussian War in 1870, to Oldway Mansion in Devon, England.

His father died in 1875 and the children, with their mother, inherited substantial wealth of 13 million dollars. He was the eldest of Isabella's children; he had three brothers and two sisters. Of these, his sister Winnaretta married into the French nobility and became a patron of the arts, while his brother Washington was a philanthropist and racehorse owner.

Singer matriculated at Downing College, Cambridge, in October 1881; his younger brother, Paris, would later study for a brief period at Caius College. Singer left the university without taking a degree. While originally born an American citizen, he was naturalised as a British subject in 1900.

He married Mary Maund in 1888, daughter of John Oxley of Maldon, Yorkshire. Secondly, he married Aline Madeline Charlotte Pilavione in 1913, daughter of Etienne of Biarritz. He left the bulk of his assets to his widow Aline, but it appears he had no children.

== Later life ==
Singer's first passion was thoroughbred horses, which he began breeding and racing in 1881. He was also a keen sportsman and a pioneer in the early development of cycling, driving, and flying in Europe. In January 1910, aged 46, he became the twenty-fourth person in France to hold a pilot's certificate from the Aéro-Club de France, and in May the eighth person in the United Kingdom to hold one from the Royal Aero Club.

In the following years, he offered a series of awards for the development of British aviation, including a £500 bounty for the first practical British-built amphibious aircraft, won by the Sopwith Bat Boat in 1913.

Singer later adopted the lifestyle of the traditional landed gentry, acquiring a country estate called Milton Hill at Milton in Berkshire (now Oxfordshire), and an apartment in central Mayfair. Two days after the outbreak of the First World War, he offered the recently rebuilt house at Milton Hill as a military hospital for soldiers and NCOs. It grew to a 220-bed facility, the largest of the privately run wartime hospitals, and treated over 4,500 men. Until the 1918 influenza pandemic, it had only had one death among its patients. Singer and his brother Washington underwrote the entire operating costs of the hospital, and Singer worked throughout the war as its chief administrator. His wife worked as matron-in-chief, and she was actively engaged in nursing and massage.

After the war, Singer became a Justice of the Peace and was made a Knight Commander of the Order of the British Empire. In 1921, he served as the High Sheriff of Berkshire. He was on the governing body of Abingdon School from 1923 to 1924.

He died in June 1929, leaving an estate of almost £500,000.
