= Washington Singer =

British race horse owner

- Born: 1866; Yonkers, New York
- Died: 1934
- Occupation(s): Racehorse owner Philanthropist
- Spouse: Ellen Mary Longsdon
- Children: Grant Allen Singer
- Parent(s): Isaac Singer; Isabella Eugenie Boyer

Washington Merritt Grant Singer (1866–1934) was an American-born British heir, philanthropist and prominent racehorse owner.

== Biography ==
=== Early life ===
Born in Yonkers, New York he was the third child of Isabella Eugenie Boyer and sewing machine magnate, Isaac Singer. The family moved to England when Washington Singer was still a child. He was raised at Oldway Mansion at Paignton on the Devon coast.

=== Equine interests ===
After he received his inheritance upon his father's death, he originally planned to run a ranch in the American West, but after spending time hunting in Devonshire with his brother, Mortimer Singer, he decided to stay in England and become a racehorse owner.

Singer was joint-master of the South Devon Hunt between 1897 and 1901, and then sole master until 1907.

A Thoroughbred horse racing enthusiast, he won the 1905 St. Leger Stakes with the colt Challacombe, trained by Alec Taylor, Jr. and the 1932 2,000 Guineas with Orwell. The Washington Singer Stakes race at Newbury Racecourse is named in his honour.

He was elected to the Jockey Club in July 1921.

=== Philanthropy ===
He became a benefactor of a number of causes and was a substantial donor to the University College of the Southwest of England, which later became the University of Exeter. One of the university's buildings, which is home to the Department of Psychology, is named in his honour.

== Personal life ==
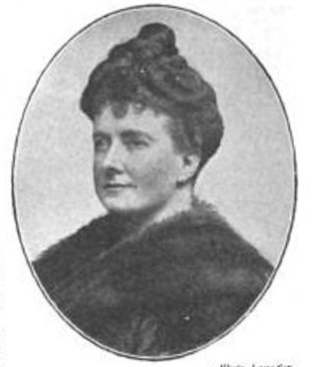
Blanche Wills-Hale, Singer's first wife

Singer lived at Steartfield House, Paignton (now the Palace Hotel). He married his first wife, Blanche Wills-Hale, in 1887. On 21 July 1915 he married Ellen Mary Longsdon, widow of Alfred Allen Longsdon, who had been drowned at Le Havre while driving his ambulance earlier that year. On 25 July 1927 they adopted Mary's youngest son, Grant Allen (Longsdon), in the name of Grant Allen Singer (1915–1942).

He was Sheriff of Wiltshire in 1924.

== Norman Court ==
In 1903, Singer purchased Norman Court, West Tytherley, Hampshire, an 18th-century country house with a 20,000-acre (81 km^{2}) estate that included the Hampshire parishes of Buckholt and Frenchmoor, and in Wiltshire the village of West Dean and parts of Farley and Pitton. The estate was inherited by his son Grant, who was killed in action during World War II at the 1942 Second Battle of El Alamein while serving with the Royal Armoured Corps, 10th Royal Hussars.

Sold by his widow in 1952, Norman Court was the home of the private Norman Court Preparatory School from 1955 until 2012. In 2021 Norman Court reopened as a training and educational centre.Norman Court training and Education Centre. From 2013-2019 it has housed Montessori school. The building was recorded as Grade II* listed in 1986.

He died in his sleep in February 1934, in Torquay, Devon.
