= Stephen Furdek =

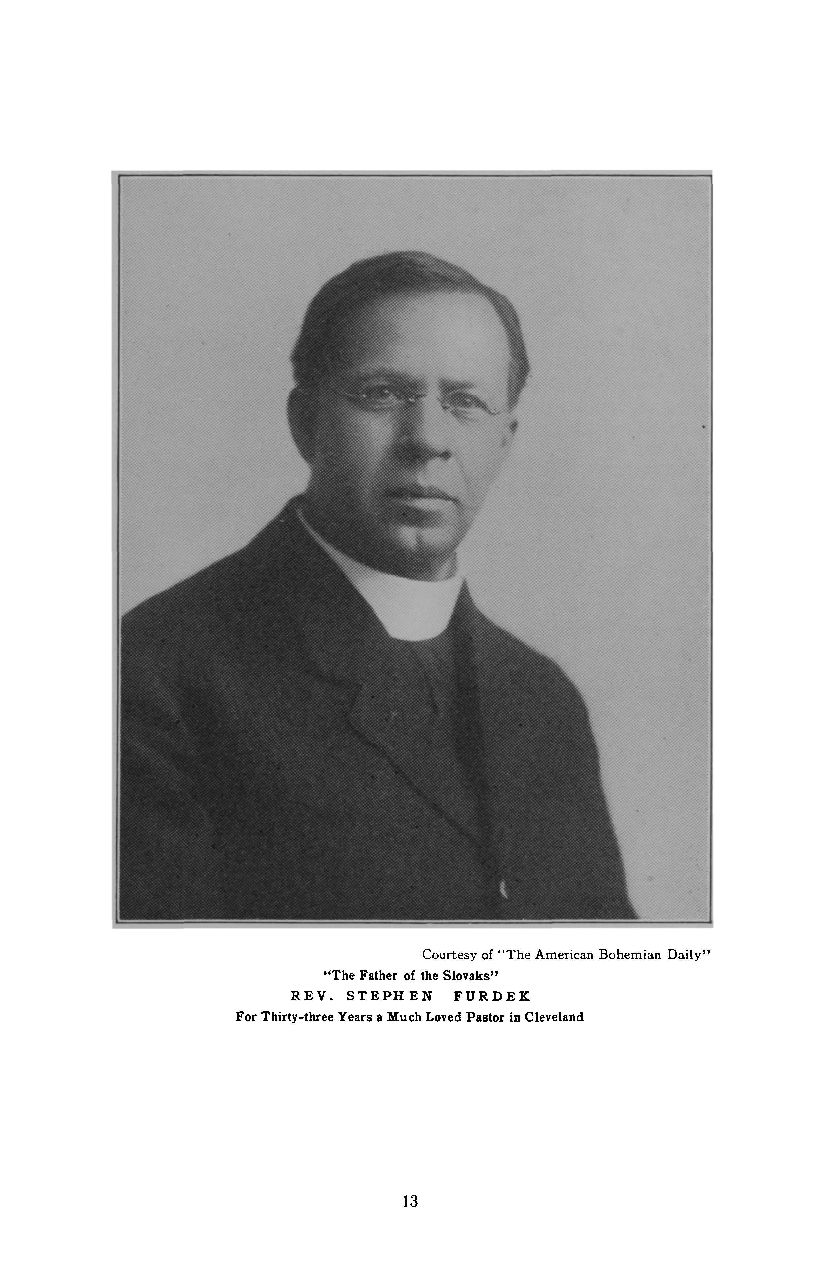
Stephen Furdek

Stephen Furdek (September 2, 1855 – January 18, 1915) was a Roman Catholic priest, a writer, and a co-founder of the First Catholic Slovak Union (Jednota). He helped organize the first parishes for Czech and Slovak immigrants in Cleveland, Ohio, and was an ardent activist for Slovak identity and nationhood. He is considered to be the first Slovak priest in the United States.

== Biography ==
Stephen Furdek was born in Trstená, Slovakia (then part of Austria-Hungary) on September 2, 1855, to Štefan and Maria (née Stopková) Furdek. He attended grammar school in Banská Bystrica and Nitra, then continued his education at the Theological Faculty in Budapest, moving to the University of Prague in 1877 where he studied classical philology and theology until 1882. At this time, Cleveland, Ohio was experiencing a rapid increase in the size of its Czech and Slovak communities. The bishop of the Cleveland diocese, Richard Gilmour wrote to the Prague Seminary seeking a priest fluent in Czech and Slovak who could help the Cleveland diocese minister to the new immigrants. Furdek was chosen due to his knowledge of both Czech and Slovak, and because he was nearing the completion of his theological studies. In March 1882, he emigrated to Cleveland, where he attended St. Mary Seminary and was ordained a Roman Catholic priest by Bishop Gilmour on July 2, 1882. Father Furdek was first assigned to St. Wenceslas Church, the first parish in Cleveland to serve Czech Catholics.The church was located at Arch (E. 35th) St. and Burwell. He served there until May 1883. He then established a parish for Czechs near E. 55th and Broadway, which was placed under the patronage of Our Lady of Lourdes. Except for a short time ministering to St. Procop's parish, he would spend the rest of his life serving the Lourdes parish.

In 1885, Fr. Furdek began another parish, St. Ladislas, to serve the Slovaks and Hungarians living in the Woodland and Buckeye Road neighborhood. The church was built in 1889 on the northeast corner of Holton and Corwin (E. 92nd) Street and was consecrated that same December. Tensions between the Slovaks and the Hungarians led to the Hungarians leaving the parish and starting their own parish, St. Elizabeth of Hungary, a few blocks away from St. Ladislas. This resulted in St. Ladislas being the first true Slovak parish in Cleveland. On September 4, 1890, the First Catholic Slovak Union was founded in Cleveland under the leadership of Fr. Furdek. The FCSU, commonly known as Jednota, is the second-oldest Slovak fraternal organization in the United States. He was also the founder and publisher of its journal. In 1892, he helped organize the FCSU's sister organization, the First Catholic Slovak Ladies Association. He was the first president of the Slovak League of America, which later played a large role in the call for an independent Czechoslovak state. He wrote profusely, writing books, pamphlets, and poetry in both Czech and Slovak on religious, political, and educational topics.

He died on January 18, 1915, in Cleveland, Ohio from complications of diabetes mellitus, and is buried in Calvary Cemetery (Cleveland).

== Memorials ==
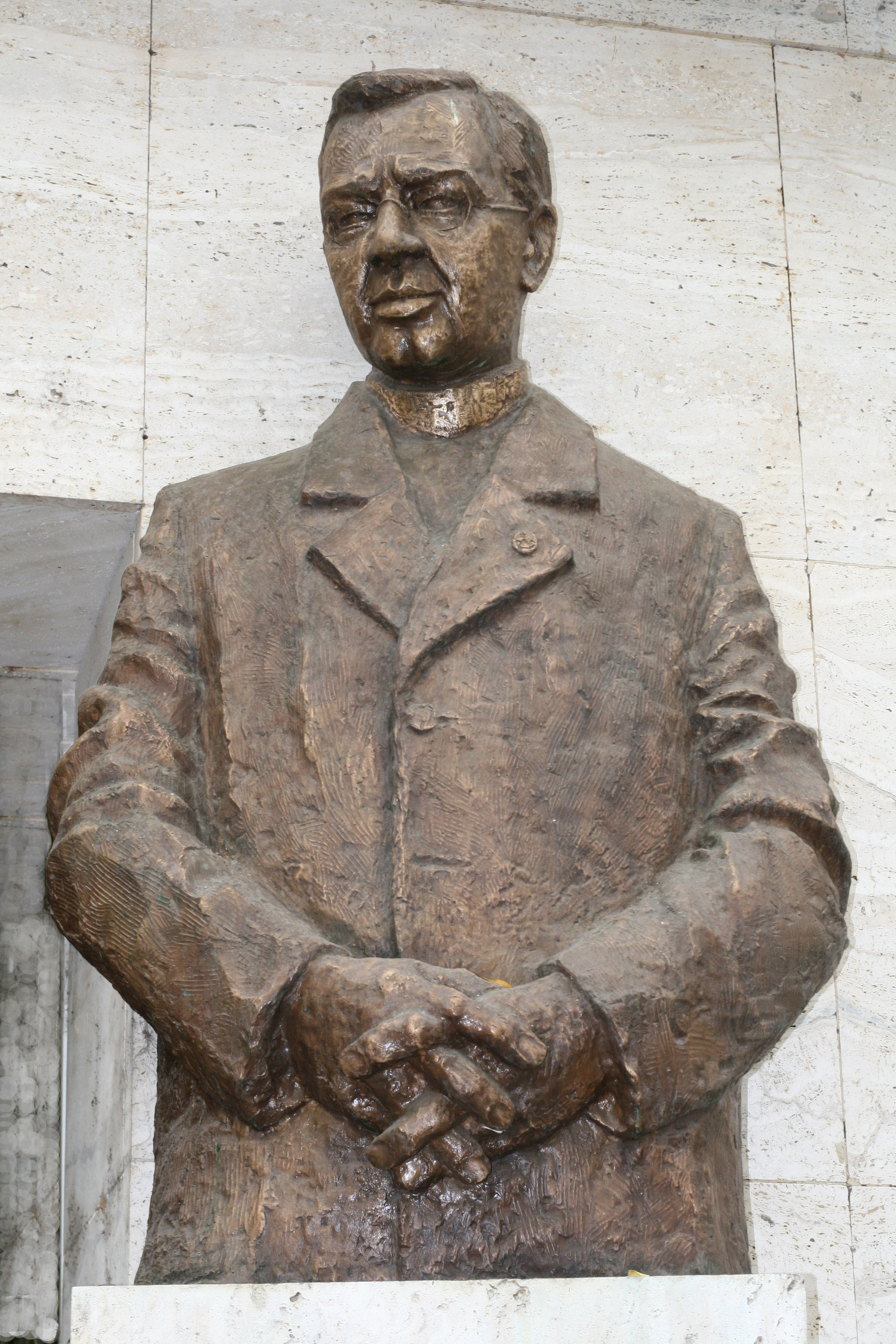
Statue in Bratislava

The Slovak cities of Petržalka, Zilina, Piestany, Martin-Záturčie, and Trstená all have streets named in his honor. There is a bust of him in the Slovak Garden in Cleveland, Ohio. A World War II Liberty ship, the SS Stephen Furdek, was named in his honor. It was awarded a battle star for its participation in the Leyte landings in the Philippines, which led up to the Battle of Leyte in 1944.
