= Portrait of Léon Delafosse =

Painting by John Singer Sargent

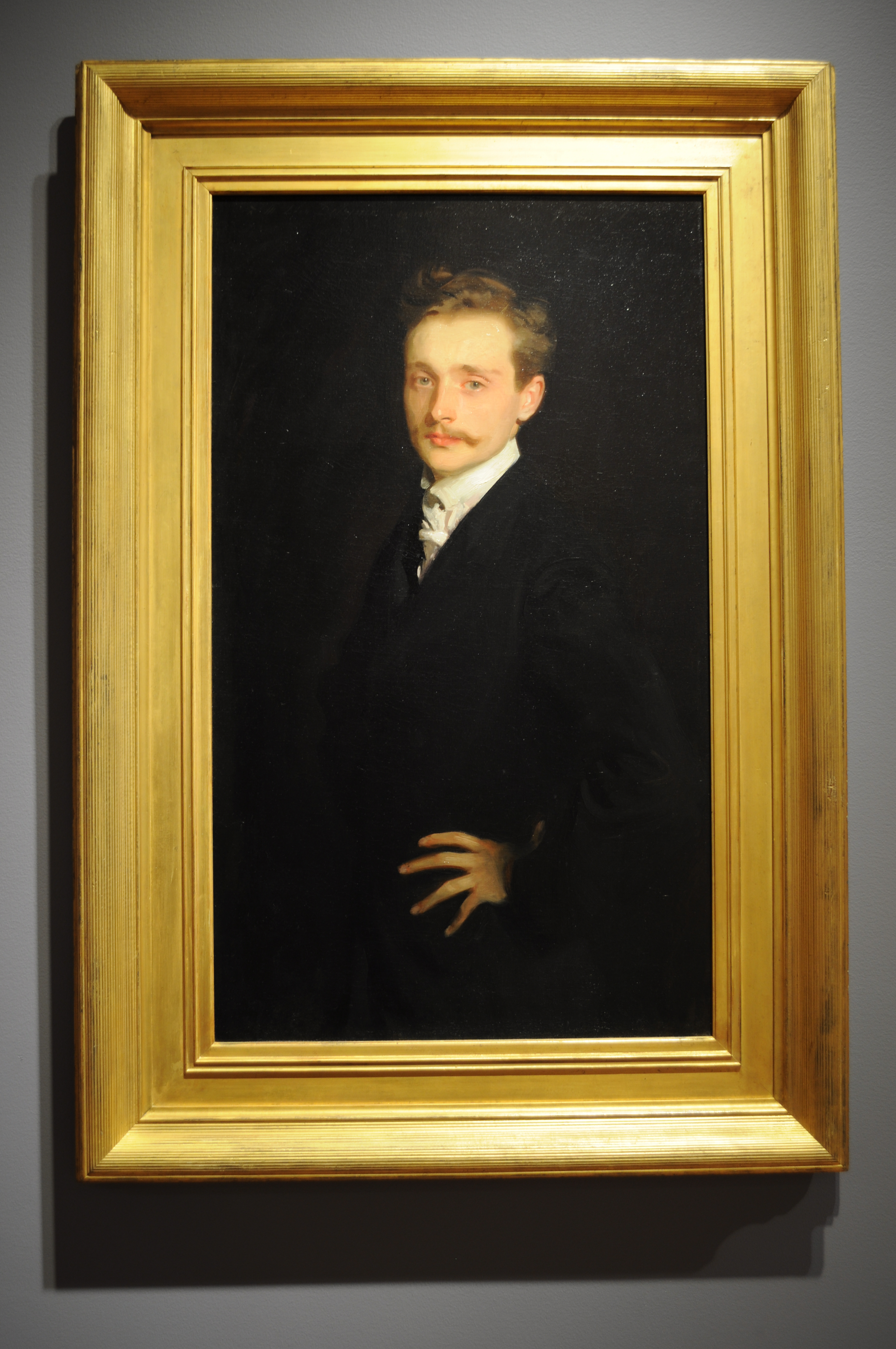
- The painting at the Seattle Art Museum in 2010
- Artist: John Singer Sargent
- Year: 1895
- Subject: Léon Delafosse
- Dimensions: 101 cm × 59.4 cm (40 in × 23.4 in)
- Location: Seattle Art Museum, Seattle

Portrait of Léon Delafosse is an 1895 painting by John Singer Sargent. The artwork is part of the collection of the Seattle Art Museum.

== See also ==
- List of works by John Singer Sargent
