= SS Stephen Furdek =

World War II Liberty ship of the United States

History

United States
- Name: Stephen Furdek
- Namesake: Stephen Furdek
- Owner: War Shipping Administration (WSA)
- Operator: Merchants & Miners Transportation Company
- Ordered: as type (EC2-S-C1) hull, MC hull 2299
- Builder: J.A. Jones Construction, Panama City, Florida
- Cost: $991,203
- Yard number: 40
- Way number: 1
- Laid down: 16 March 1944
- Launched: 28 April 1944
- Sponsored by: Mrs. Virginia Dickerman
- Completed: 23 May 1944
- Identification: Call Signal: KWBZ
- Fate: Laid up in National Defense Reserve Fleet, Mobile, Alabama, 27 September 1948; Sold for scrapping, 13 May 1970

General characteristics
- Class & type: Liberty ship; type EC2-S-C1, standard
- Tonnage: 10,865 LT DWT; 7,176 GRT
- Displacement: 3,380 long tons (3,434 t) (light); 14,245 long tons (14,474 t) (max)
- Length: 441 feet 6 inches (135 m) oa; 416 feet (127 m) pp; 427 feet (130 m) lwl
- Beam: 57 feet (17 m)
- Draft: 27 ft 9.25 in (8.4646 m)
- Installed power: 2 × Oil fired 450 °F (232 °C) boilers, operating at 220 psi (1,500 kPa); 2,500 hp (1,900 kW)
- Propulsion: 1 × triple-expansion steam engine, (manufactured by Iron Fireman Manufacturing Co., Portland, Oregon); 1 × screw propeller
- Speed: 11.5 knots (21.3 km/h; 13.2 mph)
- Capacity: 562,608 cubic feet (15,931 m^{3}) (grain); 499,573 cubic feet (14,146 m^{3}) (bale)
- Complement: 38–62 USMM; 21–40 USNAG
- Armament: Varied by ship; Bow-mounted 3-inch (76 mm)/50-caliber gun; Stern-mounted 4-inch (102 mm)/50-caliber gun; 2–8 × single 20-millimeter (0.79 in) Oerlikon anti-aircraft (AA) cannons and/or, 2–8 × 37-millimeter (1.46 in) M1 AA guns

SS Stephen Furdek was a Liberty ship built in the United States during World War II. She was named after Stephen Furdek, a Roman Catholic priest, co-founder of the First Catholic Slovak Union, commonly known as Jednota, and an ardent activist for Slovak identity and nationhood.

== Construction ==
Stephen Furdek was laid down on 16 March 1944, under a United States Maritime Commission (MARCOM) contract, MC hull 2299, by J.A. Jones Construction, Panama City, Florida; she was launched on 28 April 1944.

== History ==
She was allocated to Merchants & Miners Transportation Company, on 23 May 1944. On 27 September 1948, she was laid up in the National Defense Reserve Fleet, in Mobile, Alabama. On 13 May 1970, she was sold, along with SS Isaac M. Singer, for $61,202.08 to Union Minerals and Alloys Corporation, for scrapping. She was withdrawn from the fleet on 1 June 1970.

== Bibliography ==
- "Jones Construction, Panama City FL". ShipbuildingHistory.com. 13 October 2010.
- "Liberty Ships – World War II".
- Maritime Administration. "Stephen Furdek". Ship History Database Vessel Status Card. U.S. Department of Transportation, Maritime Administration. Archived from the original on 12 December 2019.
- Davies, James (May 2004). "Specifications (As-Built)" (PDF). p. 23.
- "SS Stephen Furdek".
