= Paignton Pier =

Pleasure pier in Paignton, Devon, England

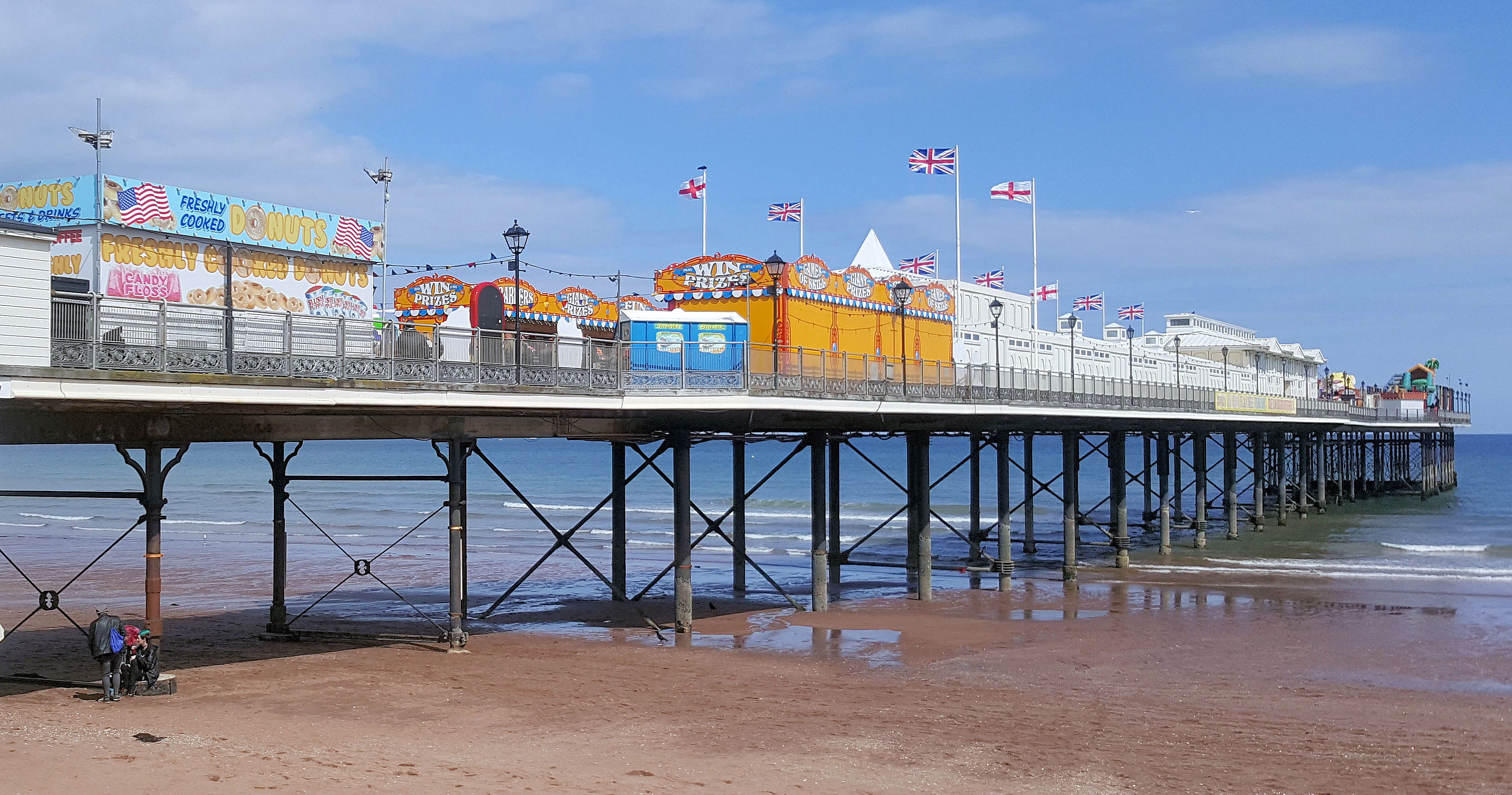
- Paignton Pier in 2019
- Type: Pleasure Pier
- Coordinates: 50.4372°N 3.5559°W
- Official name: Paignton Pier

Characteristics
- Total length: 780 feet (240 m)

History
- Constructor: Arthur Hyde Dendy
- Opening date: June 1879
- Location within Devon

Paignton Pier is a pleasure pier in the large English seaside resort of Paignton, Devon. It was financed by Arthur Hyde Dendy, a local Paignton barrister and designed by George Soudon Bridgman.

== History ==
Paignton Pier Act 1874
- Act of Parliament
- Parliament of the United Kingdom
- Long title: An Act to authorise the erection of a Pier and Works at Paignton in the county of Devon; and for other purposes.
- Citation: 37 & 38 Vict. c. xlvii

Dates
- Royal assent: 30 June 1874

Text of statute as originally enacted

The Paignton Pier Act 1874 (37 & 38 Vict. c. xlvii) received royal assent on 3 June 1874 and work commenced on its construction in October 1878 to the design of Bridgman.

The 780 feet (240 m) pier, with its customary grand pavilion at the seaward end, was opened to the public for the first time in June 1879. The pier-head pavilion was home to many forms of entertainment including singing, dancing, recitals, music hall, and most famously Gilbert and Sullivan's comic opera, re-titled HMS Pinafore on the water, performed by Mr D'Oyley's full company on 27 and 28 July 1880. In 1881 the pier-head was enlarged to facilitate the construction of a billiard room, adjoining the pavilion.

On the death of Arthur Dendy, Paignton Pier was purchased by the Devon Dock, Pier and Steamship Company, under whose ownership it became a regular stop for paddle steamers travelling between Torquay and Brixham. In 1919 the pier-head and its associated buildings were destroyed in a fire. These were never replaced and a period of decline followed. Sectioned as a defence measure in 1940, for fear of German invasion, the damaged neck was eventually repaired once hostilities had ceased.
