= SS Isaac M. Singer =

Liberty ship of WWII

History

United States
- Name: Isaac M. Singer
- Namesake: Isaac M. Singer
- Owner: War Shipping Administration (WSA)
- Operator: Moore-McCormack Lines, Inc.
- Ordered: as type (EC2-S-C1) hull, MC hull 2506
- Awarded: 23 April 1943
- Builder: St. Johns River Shipbuilding Company, Jacksonville, Florida
- Cost: $917,824
- Yard number: 70
- Way number: 4
- Laid down: 17 October 1944
- Launched: 19 November 1944
- Sponsored by: Mrs. James R.P. Bell, Jr.
- Completed: 27 November 1944
- Identification: Call sign: KYUU
- Fate: Laid up in the National Defense Reserve Fleet, Mobile, Alabama, 20 September 1948; Sold for scrapping, 13 May 1970, withdrawn from fleet, 28 May 1970

General characteristics
- Class & type: Liberty ship; type EC2-S-C1, standard
- Tonnage: 10,865 LT DWT; 7,176 GRT
- Displacement: 3,380 long tons (3,434 t) (light); 14,245 long tons (14,474 t) (max)
- Length: 441 feet 6 inches (135 m) oa; 416 feet (127 m) pp; 427 feet (130 m) lwl
- Beam: 57 feet (17 m)
- Draft: 27 ft 9.25 in (8.4646 m)
- Installed power: 2 × Oil fired 450 °F (232 °C) boilers, operating at 220 psi (1,500 kPa); 2,500 hp (1,900 kW)
- Propulsion: 1 × triple-expansion steam engine, (manufactured by General Machinery Corp., Hamilton, Ohio); 1 × screw propeller
- Speed: 11.5 knots (21.3 km/h; 13.2 mph)
- Capacity: 562,608 cubic feet (15,931 m^{3}) (grain); 499,573 cubic feet (14,146 m^{3}) (bale)
- Complement: 38–62 USMM; 21–40 USNAG
- Armament: Varied by ship; Bow-mounted 3-inch (76 mm)/50-caliber gun; Stern-mounted 4-inch (102 mm)/50-caliber gun; 2–8 × single 20-millimeter (0.79 in) Oerlikon anti-aircraft (AA) cannons and/or, 2–8 × 37-millimeter (1.46 in) M1 AA guns

SS Isaac M. Singer was a Liberty ship built in the United States during World War II. She was named after Isaac M. Singer, an American inventor, actor, and businessman. He made important improvements in the design of the sewing machine and was the founder of what became one of the first American multi-national businesses, the Singer Sewing Machine Company.

== Construction ==
Isaac M. Singer was laid down on 17 October 1944, under a Maritime Commission (MARCOM) contract, MC hull 2506, by the St. Johns River Shipbuilding Company, Jacksonville, Florida; she was sponsored by Mrs. William C. Calvin, the wife of the president of the International Brotherhood of Boilermakers and Iron Shippbuilders of America, and was launched on 19 November 1944.

== History ==
She was allocated to the Moore-McCormack Lines, Inc., on 27 November 1944. On 20 September 1948, she was laid up in the National Defense Reserve Fleet, Mobile, Alabama. She was sold for scrapping, along with SS Stephen Furdek, on 13 May 1970, to Union Minerals & Alloys Corp., for $64,202. She was removed from the fleet, 28 May 1970.

== Bibliography ==
- "St. John's River Shipbuilding, Jacksonville FL". www.ShipbuildingHistory.com. 16 October 2010.
- Maritime Administration. "Isaac M. Singer". Ship History Database Vessel Status Card. U.S. Department of Transportation, Maritime Administration.
- Davies, James (May 2004). "Specifications (As-Built)" (PDF). p. 23.
- "SS Isaac M. Singer".
