= Isaac Singer =

American inventor and businessman (1811–1875)

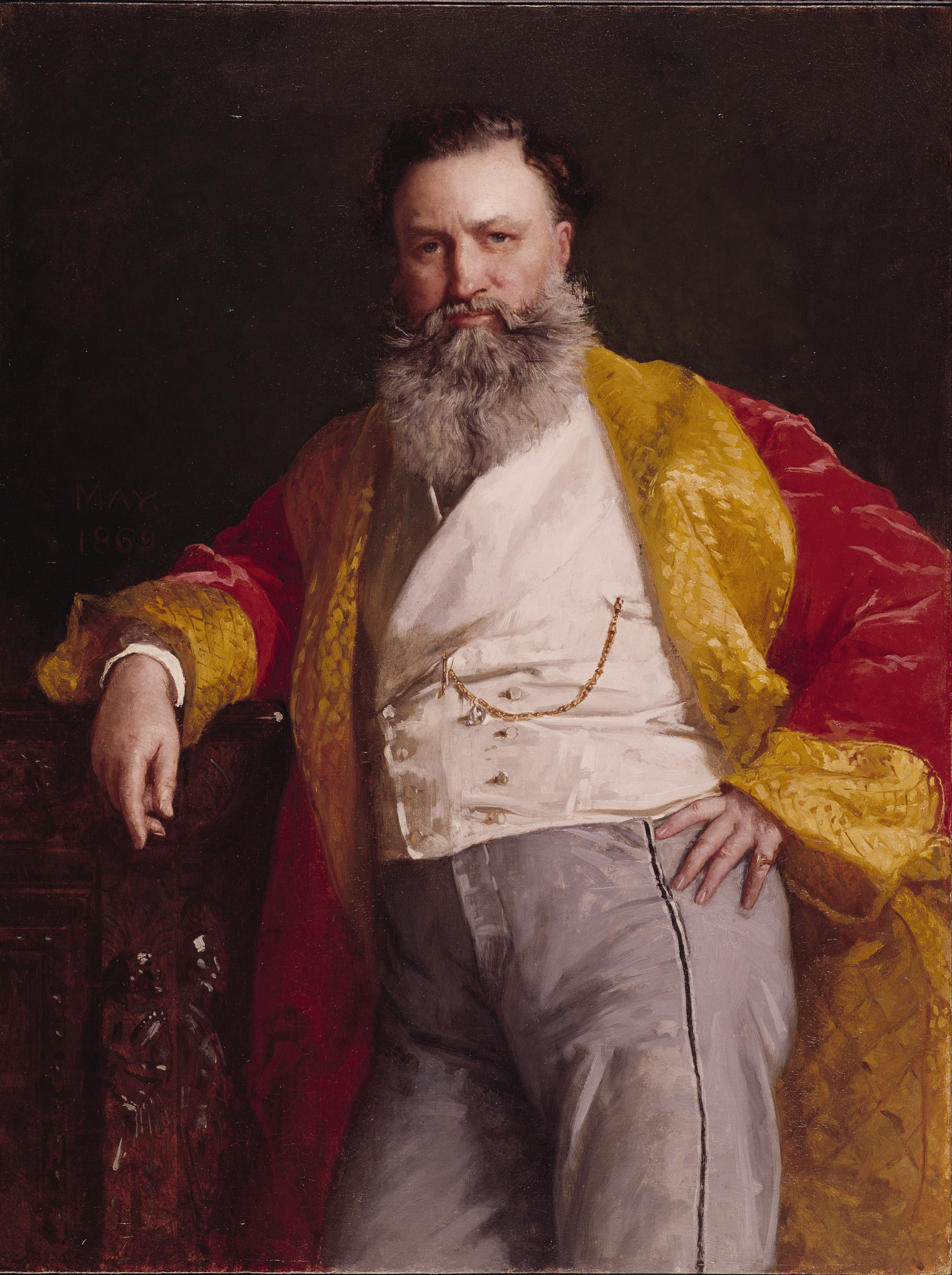
- Singer in 1869
- Born: October 27, 1811; Hamlet of Johnsonville, Town of Pittstown, New York, US
- Died: July 23, 1875 (aged 63); Paignton, Devon, UK
- Known for: Founder of the Singer Sewing Machine Company
- Spouses: Catherine Maria Haley (m. 1830; div. 1860) Isabella Eugenie Boyer (m. 1863)
- Partner: Mary Ann Sponsler (1836–1861)
- Children: 26

Isaac Merritt Singer (October 27, 1811 – July 23, 1875) was an American inventor, actor, and businessman. He made important improvements in the design of the sewing machine and was the founder of what became one of the first American multi-national businesses, the Singer Sewing Machine Company.

Many others, including Walter Hunt and Elias Howe, had patented sewing machines before Singer, but his success was based on the practicality of his machine, the ease with which it could be adapted to home use and its availability on an installments payment basis.

Singer died in 1875, dividing his $13 million fortune unequally among 20 of his living children by his wives and various mistresses, although one son, who had supported his mother in her divorce case against Singer, received only $500. Altogether, he fathered 26 children by five different women.

== Early life ==
Isaac Merritt Singer was born on October 27, 1811, in the hamlet of Johnsonville, town of Pittstown. He was the youngest of eight children born to a German father, mill builder Adam Singer (né Reisinger) from Saxony, and his American wife Ruth (née Benson). His siblings were John Valentine Singer, Alexander Singer, Elizabeth (née Singer) Colby, Christiana (née Singer) Cleveland, and Elijah Singer. In 1821, his parents divorced and his mother abandoned Isaac. At twelve, he ran away from home to join a traveling stage act, called the Rochester Players, after finding bits of work as a joiner and lathe operator.

== Career ==
In 1839, Singer obtained his first patent, for a machine to drill rock, selling it for $2,000 (or over $150,000 in 2024 dollars) to the I & M Canal Building Company. With this financial success, he opted to return to his career as an actor. He went on tour, forming a troupe known as the "Merritt Players", appearing onstage under the name "Isaac Merritt", with Mary Ann Sponsler (one of his mistresses) also appearing onstage, calling herself "Mrs. Merritt". The tour lasted about five years.

He developed and patented a "machine for carving wood and metal" on April 10, 1849.

At 38, with Mary Ann and eight children, he packed up his family and moved back to New York City, hoping to market his wood-block cutting machine. He obtained an advance to build a working prototype, and constructed one in A. B. Taylor & Co shop, where he met G. B. Zieber, who became Singer's financier and partner. However, not long after the machine was built, the steam boiler blew up at the shop, destroying the prototype. Zieber persuaded Singer to make a new start in Boston, a center of the printing trade. Singer went to Boston in 1850 to display his invention at the machine shop of Orson C. Phelps. Orders for Singer's wood cutting machine were not, however, forthcoming.

Lerow & Blodgett sewing machines were being constructed and repaired in Phelps' shop. Phelps asked Singer to look at the sewing machines, which were difficult to use and produce. Singer concluded that the sewing machine would be more reliable if the shuttle moved in a straight line rather than a circle, with a straight rather than a curved needle. Singer was able to obtain US Patent number 8294 for his improvements on August 12, 1851.

=== I. M. Singer & Co ===
In 1856, manufacturers Grover & Baker, Singer, Wheeler & Wilson, all accusing each other of patent infringement, met in Albany, New York to pursue their suits. Orlando B. Potter, a lawyer and president of the Grover and Baker Company, proposed that, rather than squander their profits on litigation, they pool their patents. This was the first patent pool, a process which enables the production of complicated machines without legal battles over patent rights. They agreed to form the Sewing Machine Combination, but for this to be of any use, they had to secure the cooperation of Elias Howe, who still held certain vital uncontested patents. Terms were arranged; Howe received a royalty on every sewing machine manufactured.

Sewing machines began to be mass-produced. I. M. Singer & Co manufactured 2,564 machines in 1856, and 13,000 in 1860 at a new plant on Mott Street in New York. Later, a massive plant was built near Elizabeth, New Jersey.

Up to then, sewing machines had been industrial machines, made for garments, shoes, bridles and for tailors, but in 1856, smaller machines began to be marketed for home use. However, at the then enormous price of over $100 ($4,094.82 in 2024 USD), few sold. Singer invested heavily in mass production utilizing the concept of interchangeable parts developed by Samuel Colt and Eli Whitney for their firearms. He was able to cut the price in half, while at the same time increasing his profit margin by 530%. Singer was the first who put a family machine, "the turtle back", on the market. Eventually, the price came down to $10(about $404.23 in 2024 USD) According to PBS, "His partner, Edward Cabot Clark, pioneered installment purchasing plans and accepted trade-ins, causing sales to soar."

Women were able to make items at home for their families or for sale and charitable groups began to support poorer women to find useful skills and respectable employment in sewing, such as the Ladies Work Society (1875), the Association for the Sale of Works of Ladies of Limited Means, the Co-operative Needlewoman's Society and associated magazines, pattern books and group classes began for the better off women who also wanted to have some form of useful, economic activity, which a sewing machine at home now offered.

I. M. Singer expanded into the European market, first starting in Scotland in Bonnybridge, Stirlingshire, next to the iron foundries that supplied the castings for the chassis until expansion was hindered by the expansion of the foundries around them and they then moved to Clydebank, establishing the world's largest sewing machine factory, built between 1882 and 1885, by George McKenzie in Kilbowie, Clydebank, near Glasgow, consisting of two main manufacturing buildings on three levels (one building for making the domestic machines, the other for industrial model production), with a 200 ft (over 60 meters) high tower with the 'Singer' name logo and four clock faces which was the largest four-sided clock tower at the time. Singer opened the factory at Clydebank with 3,500 people making 8,000 sewing machines a week on average. The factory was linked directly to railway lines, and via stations in Dumbarton and Helensburgh to assist in distribution. Later improvements included a further two levels for the production blocks and a power station and sawmills. (Note: images of the tower and the factory's transport connections are available on the Scottish National Buildings Record) The factory later supplied military and home sewers, and made munitions during World War II. In 1941, the factory and area was severely damaged (losing 390,000 sq ft 36,000 sq m) in the 'Clydebank Blitz' when at least 35,000 homes were damaged and 500 people, including 39 Singer workers were killed.

Even as early as 1880, Singer machines compared favorably with their nearest competitors: information articles becoming marketing tool. By the 1900s, this factory, controlled by the parent company, made 1.5 million machines sold around the world, helping the Singer company in becoming one of the first American-based multinational corporations, with agencies in Paris and Rio de Janeiro.

Later as the Singer Manufacturing Company and its competitors expanded, due to its affordability (or purchase plan terms) by the 1940s there were 24,000 sewing classes a year running in the UK alone, and the Education Act 1944 made practical dressmaking a compulsory subject for girls in all state schools. By the 1950s, there were Singer Teen-Age Sewing Classes and advertising campaigns to encourage girls to make their own fashions to attract boys' interest.

=== Changes to company in Europe ===
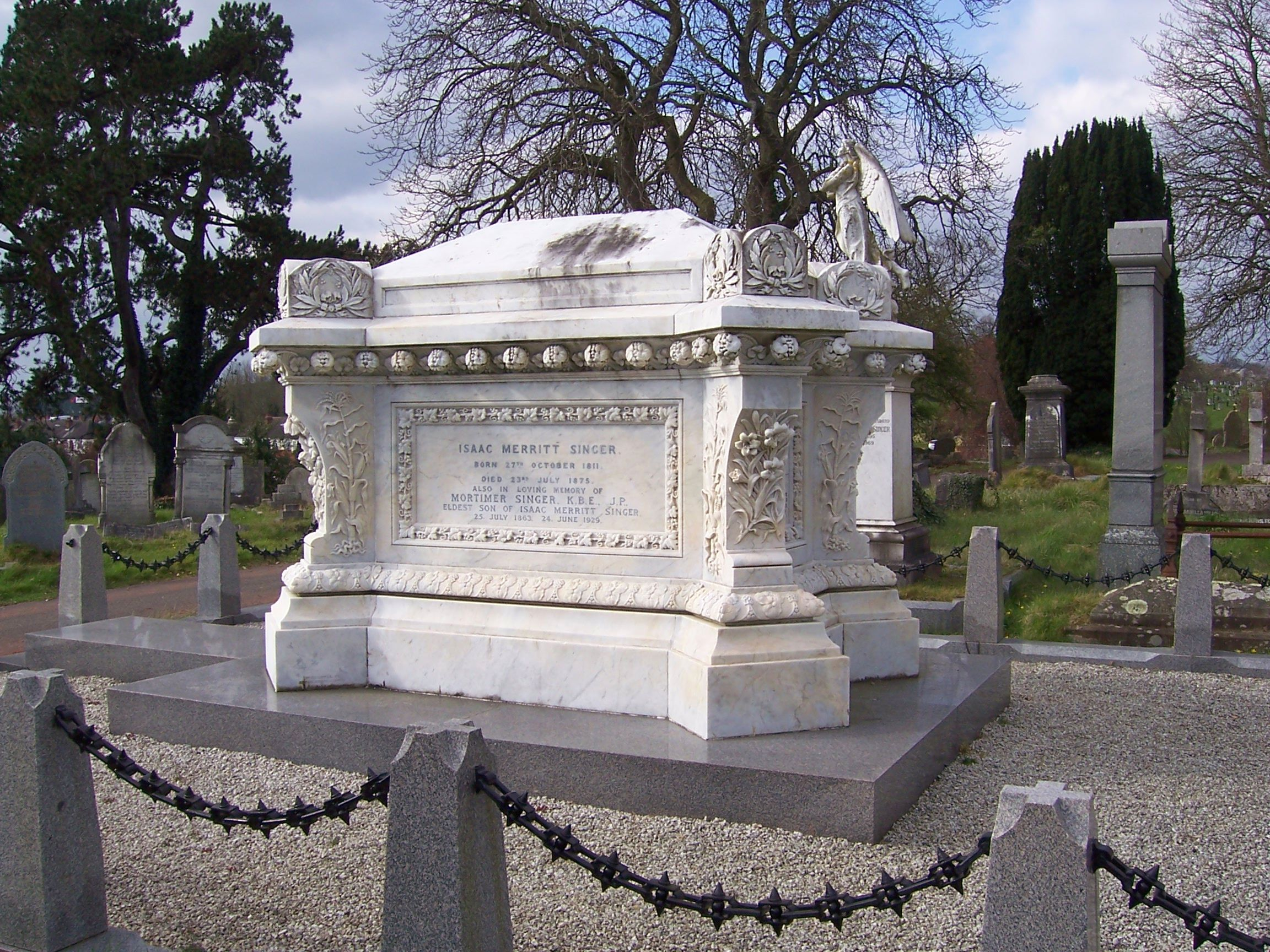
Singer's grave in Torquay Cemetery

In 1863, I. M. Singer & Co. was dissolved by mutual consent with Edward Cabot Clark seeing Singer's reputation as a risk to growth; but the business continued with Singer owning 40% of shares and still on the board, as "The Singer Manufacturing Company", in 1887.

In 1871, Singer purchased an estate and settled with Isabella in Paignton, Devon, England. He commissioned the 110-roomed Oldway Mansion as his private residence, with a hall of mirrors, maze and grotto garden; it was rebuilt by Paris Singer, his third son from Isabella, in the style of the Palace of Versailles. The area became known locally as 'Singerton'. It has been named by the Victorian Society as a heritage building at risk of disrepair.

=== Consequence on global garment industry ===
Singer's prototype sewing machine became the first to work in a practical way. It could sew 900 stitches per minute, far better than the 40 of an accomplished seamstress on simple work. This started the industrialization of garment and textile manufacturing, as a shirt took an hour to make compared to fifteen hours previously, but these still needed finishing by hand, and the finishers worked alone on piecework terms at home, but mass over-production by factories' machines, led to pressure on wages and to unemployment.

In 1911, most of the mainly female workforce at the Clydebank Singer factory went on strike in support of 12 workers who had objected to increased workload and lower pay conditions imposed (by this time there were 11,500 employees). Although the strike did not succeed, Singer's fired 400 workers including the union leaders. The Singer Strike was one of the key actions leading to protests known as Red Clydeside.

In the 1960s, Japanese production efficiency brought aluminum body machines and products at lower pricing which outsold the cast iron Singer machines. The symbolic tower was knocked down as the Singer Clydebank factory was modernized, but it closed in 1980 and was demolished in the late 1990s.

== Personal life ==
In 1830, at nineteen, Isaac Singer married fifteen-year-old Catherine Maria Haley (1815–1884). The couple had two children before he left her to join the Baltimore Strolling Players. In 1860, Singer divorced Catherine on the basis of her adultery with Stephen Kent. Their son William spoke up for his mother in the divorce case and was snubbed by Singer, including in his will where William received just $500 of Singer's $13,000,000 fortune. Their two children were:

- William Adam Singer (1834–1914), who in 1872 married Sarah Augusta Webb (1851–1909), a twin sister of William Seward Webb (who married Eliza Osgood Vanderbilt).
- Lillian C. Singer (1837–1912), who married Harry Hodson.

In 1836, while still married to Catherine, Singer began a 25-year affair with Mary Ann Sponsler. Together, Mary Ann and Isaac had ten children, two of whom died at birth, including:

- Isaac Augustus Singer (1837–1902), who married Sarah Jane Clarke.
- Vouletti Theresa Singer (1840–1913), who married William Fash Proctor.
- John Albert Singer (1842–1911), who married Jennie C. Belinski.
- Fanny Elizabeth Singer (1844–1909), who married William S. Archer.
- Jasper Hamlet Singer (1846–1922), who married Jane Collier Cook.
- Mary Olivia Singer (1848–1900), who married Sturges Selleck Whitlock, a Connecticut state senator.
- Julia Ann Singer (1855–1923), who married Martin J. Herz.
- Caroline Virginia Singer (1857–1896), who married Augustus C. Foster.

Financial success allowed Singer to buy a mansion on Fifth Avenue, into which he moved his second family. He and Mary Ann had abandoned their joint acting company, the Merritt Players, as his inventions were more successful. He continued to live with Mary Ann, until she spotted him driving down Fifth Avenue seated beside Mary McGonigal, an employee, about whom Mary Ann already had suspicions. Reportedly, Singer also had an affair with McGonigal's sister, Kate McGonigal. Together, Mary McGonigal and Isaac were the parents of seven children (who used the surname Matthews), two of whom died at birth, including:

- Ruth Mary Matthews (b. 1852)
- Clara Matthews (1854–1933), who married Col. Hugh Stafford in 1880.
- Margaret Matthews (1858–1939), who married Granville Henry Jackson Alexander, Esq., the High Sheriff of Armagh.
- Charles Alexander Matthews (1859–1883), who married Minnie Mathews.
- Florence Adelaide Matthews (c. 1859–1932), who married Harry Ruthven Pratt.

Upon the discovery of his infidelity, Singer beat Mary Ann senseless. Mary Ann, still calling herself Mrs. I. M. Singer, had her husband arrested for bigamy. Singer was let out on bond and, disgraced, fled to London in 1862, taking Mary McGonigal with him. In the aftermath, another of Isaac's families was discovered: he had a "wife", Mary Eastwood Walters, a machine demonstrator, and had had a daughter in Lower Manhattan:

- Alice Eastwood (née Walters) Merritt (1852–1890), who adopted the surname Merritt and married twice, including to W. A. P. LaGrove at age eighteen in a marriage arranged by Singer.

By 1860, Isaac had fathered and acknowledged twenty children, sixteen of them still then living, by four women. In 1861, his longstanding mistress Mary Ann took him to court for abusing her and daughter Vouletti. With Isaac in London, Mary Ann began setting about securing a financial claim to his assets by filing documents detailing his infidelities, and claiming that, though she had never been formally married to Isaac, they were wed under common law by living together for seven months after Isaac had been divorced from his first wife, Catherine. Eventually, a settlement was made, but no divorce was granted. However, she asserted that she was free to marry, and indeed she married John E. Foster.

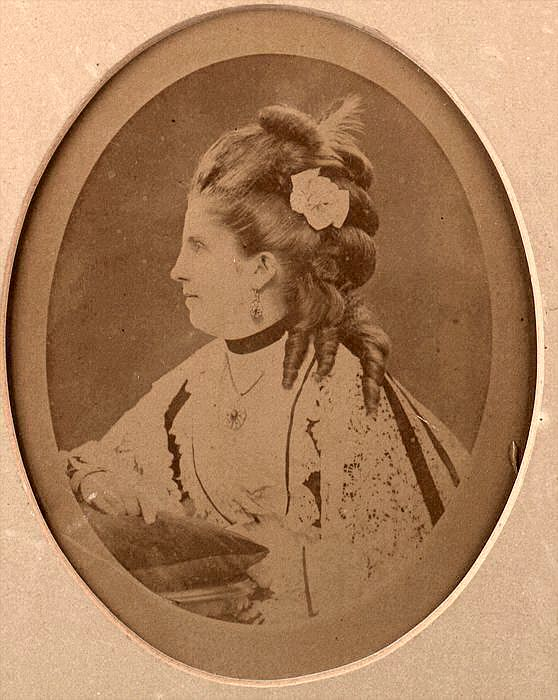
Singer's second wife, Isabella Eugenie Boyer

Isaac, meanwhile, had renewed acquaintance with Isabella Eugenie Boyer, a nineteen-year-old Frenchwoman, whom he had lived with in Paris when he was staying there in 1860. She left her husband and married Isaac, who was by now fifty, under the name of Isabella Eugenie Sommerville on June 13, 1863, while she was pregnant. Together, they had six children:

- Sir Adam Mortimer Singer (1863–1929)
- Winnaretta Eugenie Singer (1865–1943), a patron of 20th-century music who married Prince Louis de Scey-Montbéliard in 1887. They divorced in 1892 and she married Prince Edmond de Polignac.
- Washington Merritt Grant Singer (1866–1934), who married Blanche Emmeline Hale and Ellen Mary Allen.
- Paris Eugene Singer (1867–1932), who married Cecilia Henrietta Augusta "Lillie" Graham (1867–1951). Paris was a close friend of the Palm Beach architect Addison Mizner.
- Isabelle-Blanche Singer (1869–1896), who married the French aristocrat Jean, Duc Decazes et de Glücksbierg in 1888.
- Franklin Merritt Morse Singer (1870–1939), who married Emilie Maigret.

Isaac Singer died in 1875, shortly after the wedding of his daughter by Mary Eastwood Walters, Alice, whose dress had cost as much as a London apartment. His funeral was an elaborate affair with eighty horse-drawn carriages, and around 2,000 mourners, to see him buried locally in Torquay Cemetery, at his request in three layers of coffin (cedar lined with satin, lead, English oak with silver decoration) and a marble tomb.

== Legacy and honors ==
- The World War II Liberty Ship SS Isaac M. Singer was named in his honor.
- Singer Island, Florida was named for his son Paris Singer
