= Léon Delafosse =

French composer and pianist

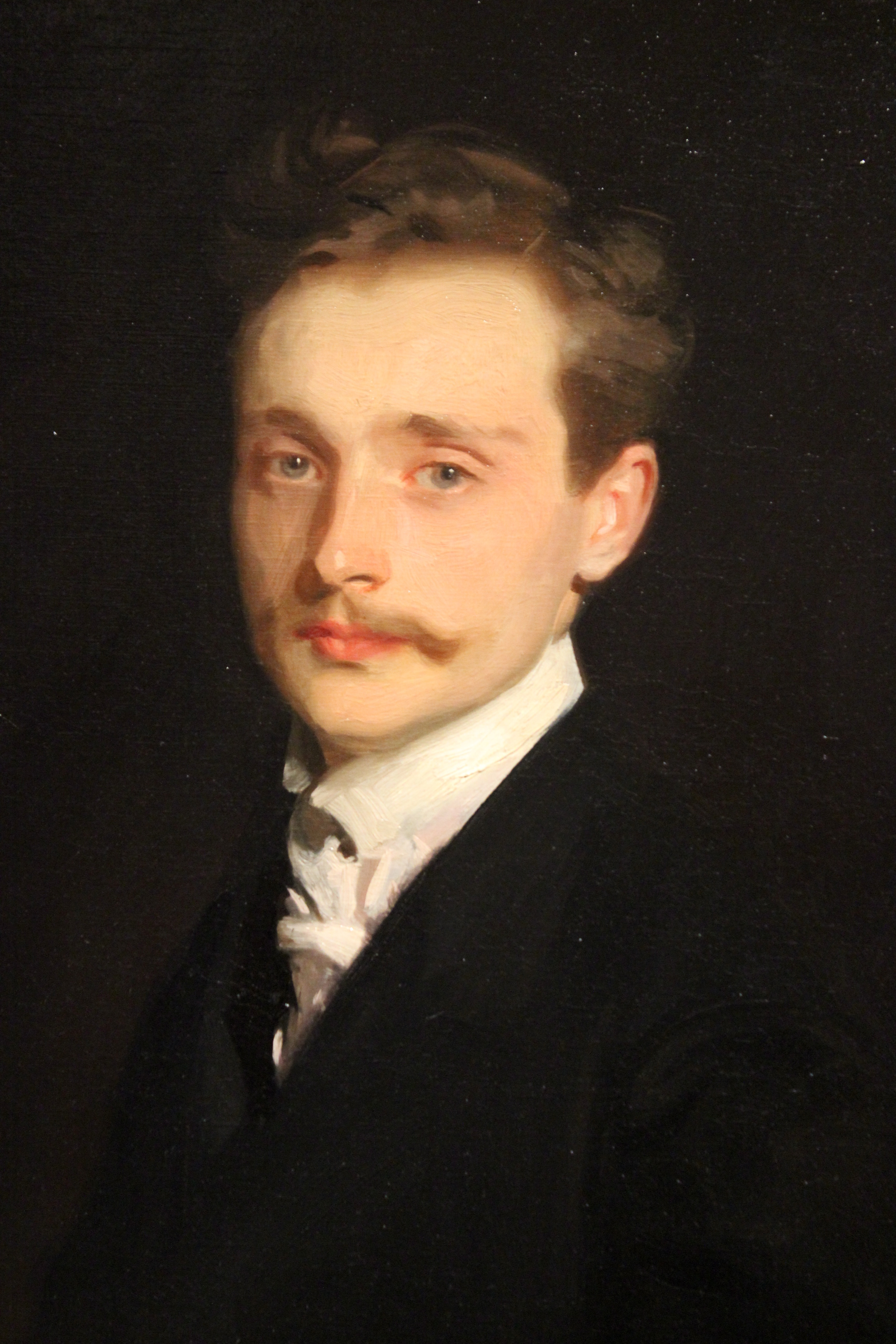
Portrait of Léon Delafosse by John Singer Sargent

Léon Delafosse (1874 – 1951) was a French composer and pianist. His musical works included études, arabesques, waltzes and nocturnes. It has been claimed that he was the model for the character of Charles Morel, a violinist portrayed in Marcel Proust's novel In Search of Lost Time.

Delafosse was also painted as the subject of a portrait by John Singer Sargent. The portrait currently resides in the Seattle Art Museum. Sargent had also dedicated "The Grand Canal Venice" to Delafosse, writing in the inscription "à Léon Delafosse en toute admiration et amitié".

== Biography ==
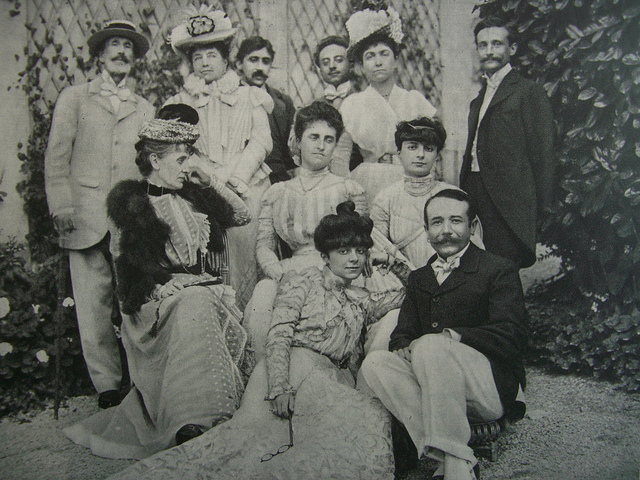
Léon Delafosse pictured with Marcel Proust, and others

Delafosse was born poor. His mother was a concierge, who also taught him piano as a child. Delafosse became a student of Antoine François Marmontel (1850-1907) at the Conservatoire de Paris. He gave his first recital at the age of seven, and won first prize at the Conservatoire at age 13. He subsequently became the protégé of the poet Robert de Montesquiou (1855-1921), the countess Metternich and the princess Rachel de Brancovan. He gave recitals, but also wrote compositions for piano, including Soirée d'amour (1895), Quintette des fleurs (1896), Mandolines à la Passante and Cinq Fantaisies, and a Concerto (1898) and a Konzertstück for piano and orchestra.

In 1894 he came into contact with Marcel Proust; they became friends, and he set one of Proust's poems, "Mensonges" (Lies) to music. Delafosse dedicated compositions to both Montesquiou and Proust. Montesquiou called him "The lion of the piano". Both writers would later distance themselves from Delafosse, making him no longer welcome in Parisian literary salons. When a friend suggested to Proust to organize a concert with Delafosse, Proust replied that he would rather not see him: "M. Delafosse, qu'il me serait peu agréable d'avoir chez moi".

== Performances and compositions ==
Delafosse was known for his interpretations of Chopin and Liszt. He often performed in the drawing room of Countess Saussine, and gave several private recitals at the Salle Érard in 1893/1894. In 1896 Delafosse gave a series of concerts in London with the famous Belgian violinist Eugène Ysaÿe to a mixed reception.

Date Published	Name	Sections	Dedicated to
1895	Les chauves-souris	8	Madeleine Lemaire, Madame la Comtesse de Saussine, Madame la Comtesse E. d'Avaray, M. Marcel Proust, M. Maurice Bagès
1896	Soirs d'amour	6	Sybil Sanderson
1897	Quintette de fleurs	5	Madame la Comtesse Potocka
1900	Fantaisie pour piano et orchestre	1	Teresa Carreño
1900	Nocturne	1	la Princesse Bassaraba de Brancovan
1902	6 Etudes de concert	6	Madame Szarvady, Madame Beddington, Mr. Antonin Marmontel
1910	Prelude in C minor	1	Monsieur Percy Grainger
1910	Arabesques	5	
1910	Valse	1	
1911	Barcarolle No.2	1	Monsieur F. Held
1912	Offrandes	6	
1937	Symphonie Pianistique	5	

== Media ==
Delafosse is the protagonist of the novel Charming Young Man by Eliot Schrefer.
