= Paris Singer =

American real estate developer and philanthropist

Paris Eugene Singer
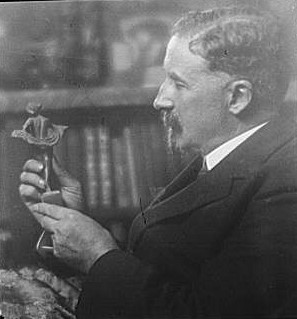
- Singer in 1916
- Born: February 20, 1867; Paris, France
- Died: June 24, 1932 (aged 65); London, England
- Resting place: Torquay, England
- Occupations: Real estate developer, philanthropist
- Known for: Friendship with architect Addison Mizner; building the Everglades Club
- Spouse: Cecilia Henrietta Augusta ("Lillie") Graham
- Children: 5 by Lillie, and 1 by Isadora Duncan
- Parents: Isaac Singer (father); Isabella Eugenie Boyer (mother)

Paris Eugene Singer (20 February 1867 – 24 June 1932) was an early resident of Palm Beach, Florida. Singer was an American real estate developer and philanthropist and he was noted as being a "man of luxury".

== Personal life ==
He was 22nd of the 24 children of inventor and industrialist Isaac Singer of Singer Sewing Machine Company fame, from whom he inherited money; and the fourth child of Isabella Eugénie Boyer's six.

Born in Paris, Singer was raised at Oldway Mansion in Paignton, Devon, England, and educated at Newton Abbot Proprietary College alongside fellow students Arthur Quiller-Couch, Percy Harrison Fawcett and Bertram Fletcher Robinson. In 1885 he matriculated at Gonville and Caius College, Cambridge, but like his elder brother Mortimer left without taking a degree.

Singer married Australian-born Cecilia Henrietta Augusta ("Lillie") Graham (1867–1951), who bore him five children. He had a tempestuous romance with famous dancer Isadora Duncan, whose career he helped, and with whom he had another son, Patrick (born 1910, drowned 1913). Singer Island, Florida, is named for him.

== The Palm Beach projects ==
In 1917 Singer met the future Palm Beach architect Addison Mizner; they became "inseparable." It was through Singer's influence that Mizner arrived in Palm Beach on January 5, 1918, in part for his health; he was Singer's house guest (at 123 Peruvian Avenue). Mizner's first Florida project was transforming Singer's unimpressive "villa" into the Chinese Villa, in which Singer lived until the Everglades Club was completed in 1919.

Mizner said of Singer in 1917:

[He was] the cause of my existence for the next ten years. He was the finest-looking man I ever saw; six feet, three or four, straight as a die, with a fine figure. At this time, he was fifty and looked forty.

He wrote later:

Paris was a strange, silent man, who loved to look on but hard to talk to unless you got him on his own subjects. At this time it was hospital work.

Singer had built a string of hospitals in England and France "for the war-wounded" (in the First World War). At the urging of Lady Randolph Churchill, he donated the use of his house at Oldway in Paignton to be used by the American Women's War Relief Fund as a military hospital. Deciding to build one in Palm Beach, after consulting with Mizner, he bought a large parcel of land on which the "Touchstone Convalescent Club" was to be built. He hired Mizner to build it, and Mizner moved to Palm Beach. Mizner purchased from him the "virtually inoperable pottery factory, 'Las Manos' ['The Hands']".

Paris Singer was the president of the Everglades Club, as the convalescent home soon became (the war had ended), and lived there in an apartment constructed for him. He planned on what became Singer Island a hotel, the Blue Heron, designed by Mizner, to be the most luxurious ever built, as part of a large new resort. An "aerial ferry" would connect it to the mainland, with 12 cable cars 136 feet above the water, since West Palm Beach refused to permit a bridge. It was the largest building Mizner ever designed. Because of the Florida real estate collapse of 1926 and its effects on Singer, the hotel was not completed. It was known as "Singer's Folly" until razed in 1940. This also contributed to the end of Singer's close friendship with Mizner, which ended in 1927.

== Financial decline and death ==
The real estate collapse forced the Everglades Club into receivership, as Singer was unable to service the loans for which the club was collateral. He was arrested in April 1928 at the club, on charges of real estate fraud. A judge dismissed the charges three weeks later, but Singer, having been publicly humiliated, left Palm Beach immediately and never lived there again.

The stock market crash of 1929 further depleted his funds, and he spent his final years quietly with his wife and former nurse Joan Balsh in his Moorish house (since demolished) in Saint-Jean-Cap-Ferrat, France. He died in London.
