= Concerto for Two Pianos and Orchestra (Poulenc) =

1932 composition by Francis Poulenc

Concerto pour deux pianos
- by Francis Poulenc
- Poulenc in 1922
- Key: D minor
- Catalogue: FP 61
- Composed: 1932
- Dedication: Princess Edmond de Polignac

Francis Poulenc's Concerto pour deux pianos (Concerto for Two Pianos and Orchestra) in D minor, FP 61, was composed over the period of three months in the summer of 1932. It is often described as the climax of Poulenc's early period. The composer wrote to the Belgian musicologist Paul Collaer: "You will see for yourself what an enormous step forward it is from my previous work and that I am really entering my great period."

The concerto was commissioned by and dedicated to the Princess Edmond de Polignac, an American-born arts patron to whom many early-20th-century masterpieces are dedicated, including Stravinsky's Renard, Ravel's Pavane pour une infante défunte, Kurt Weill's Second Symphony, and Satie's Socrate. Her Paris salon was a gathering place for the musical avant-garde.

The premiere was given on September 5, 1932, at the International Society for Contemporary Music in Venice. Poulenc and his childhood friend Jacques Février were concerto soloists with the La Scala Orchestra, with Désiré Defauw (later conductor of the Chicago Symphony Orchestra) conducting. Poulenc was gratified by the warm acclaim his work received, and later performed the concerto with Benjamin Britten in England in 1945.

== Inspirations ==
The concerto's recurring moto perpetuo, modally inflected figurations are clearly inspired by Poulenc's encounter with a Balinese gamelan at the 1931 Exposition Coloniale de Paris. Additionally, the work's instrumentation and "jazzy" effects are reminiscent of Ravel's G major Concerto, which was premiered at Paris in January 1932.

Inevitably, comparisons have been drawn with Mozart's Concerto in E♭ for two pianos, K. 365, but the opening Larghetto's graceful, simple melody and gentle, Alberti bass-like accompaniment evokes the Romanze of Mozart's D minor Piano Concerto, K. 466. Poulenc acknowledged that he chose for the opening theme to hearken back to Mozart because "I have a veneration for the melodic line and because I prefer Mozart to all other composers". Furthermore, Poulenc wrote in a letter to Igor Markevitch, "Would you like to know what I had on my piano during the two months gestation of the Concerto? The concertos of Mozart, those of Liszt, that of Ravel, and your Partita".

== Instrumentation ==
The concerto is scored for two pianos and an orchestra of flute, piccolo, two oboes (second doubling cor anglais), two clarinets, two bassoons, two horns, two trumpets, two trombones, tuba, percussion (snare drum, shallow snare drum, bass drum, castanets, triangle, military drum, and suspended cymbal), and strings.

== Style and form ==
The concerto features simple ABA form in the first and second movements, but suggests a more complex rondo form with intervening episodes in the finale. The concerto is in three movements:

1. Allegro ma non troppo (D minor)
2. Larghetto (B♭ major)
3. Allegro molto (D minor)

=== I. Allegro ma non troppo ===
Poulenc chooses to bypass the conventions of sonata allegro in the opening movement in favor of ternary form, with a slower middle section. If this first movement is meant to evoke Mozart, it is the blithe composer of the delightful Divertimenti and Serenades. The general effect is "gay and direct", words Poulenc often used to describe his own music.

=== II. Larghetto ===
In the gently rocking, consciously naive Larghetto, Poulenc evokes the famous Andante from Mozart's D minor Concerto, K. 466. The increasingly sonorous, steadily building middle section echoes the spirit of Camille Saint-Saëns, who, though indefatigably French, could in his serious moments be among the most Mozartean of 19th-century composers. Poulenc commented, "In the Larghetto of this Concerto I permitted myself, for the first theme, to return to Mozart, because I have a fondness for the melodic line and I prefer Mozart to all other musicians. If the movement begins alla Mozart, it quickly diverges at the entrance of the second piano, toward a style that was familiar to me at the time."

=== III. Allegro molto ===
Poulenc's finale is a syncretic rondo that merges the insouciance of a Parisian music hall and the mesmerizing sonorities of a gamelan orchestra. Its scintillating patter and energetic rhythms produce a vivacious, effervescent effect. As did his idol Mozart, Poulenc favors us with profligate melodious invention, featuring a new theme for nearly each succeeding section. His biographer Henri Hell has observed, "the finale flirts with one of those deliberately vulgar themes never far from the composer's heart."

As brilliant as it sounds, the concerto demands of its piano soloists more skills of ensemble than of technique. Although the pianos intersperse conversational interludes, conventional cadenzas are absent. Throughout the concerto, the pianists play nearly continuously, sometimes unaccompanied by the orchestra. Poulenc creates a dramatic yet charming dialogue between the two keyboards and the supporting orchestra ensemble. Unusually, his orchestration foregrounds the woodwinds, brass and percussion, relegating the strings to an unfamiliar secondary role.

== Tiler Peck ballet ==
In 2024, the New York City Ballet premiered a ballet choreographed by Tiler Peck to Poulenc's concerto.

== Quotes ==
Poulenc’s generally light style is marked by a range of traits: simple, tuneful melodic ideas of narrow range and short duration; lively rhythmic content often using ostinatos and a fluidity of changing meters; clear, transparent textures with little contrapuntal writing; an essentially diatonic tonal language spiced by some dissonance; and clear forms, occasionally involving cyclical recall of thematic material.

— Michael Thomas Roeder

The opening has a sonata-form exposition and recapitulation along with bits of once-popular chansons (like croutons in salad) that complement the composer's own jaunty first and second subjects. The slow, sighing central section replaces a development group before Poulenc returns to the boulevards and boites.

The Larghetto pays homage to Mozart throughout... at one point Piano I leads in effect a musette, as if on a toy piano. The middle section becomes more impassioned, building to a sonorous climax before calm is restored.

Returning to the mood of the first movement, the finale begins with percussive flourishes before it takes off like an Alfa-Romeo in a Grand prix through the avenues and allées of day-and-night Paris, past marching bands and music halls. There is, however, an interlude lyrique et romantique when the Alfa stops for a bedroom tryst, where perfume and perspiration mix with the smoke from Gauloises, after which the race resumes, even more racily.

— Roger Dettmer

== Bibliography ==
- Schmidt, Carl B. (1995). The Music of Francis Poulenc (1899–1963): A Catalogue. Oxford: Clarendon Press. ISBN 9780191585166.
