= Jean-Joseph Carriès =

French sculptor, ceramist, and miniaturist

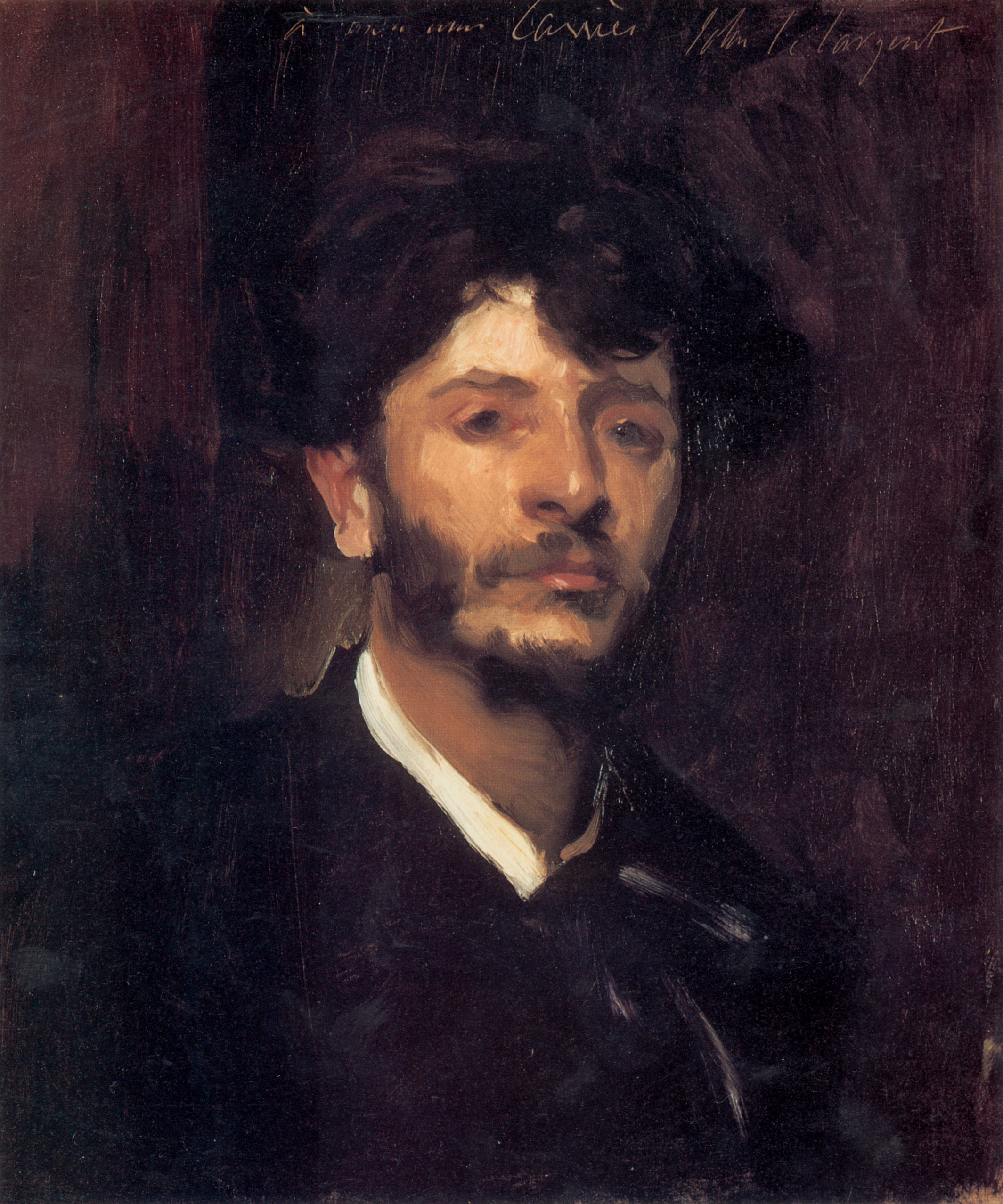
Portrait of Jean-Joseph Carriès by John Singer Sargent

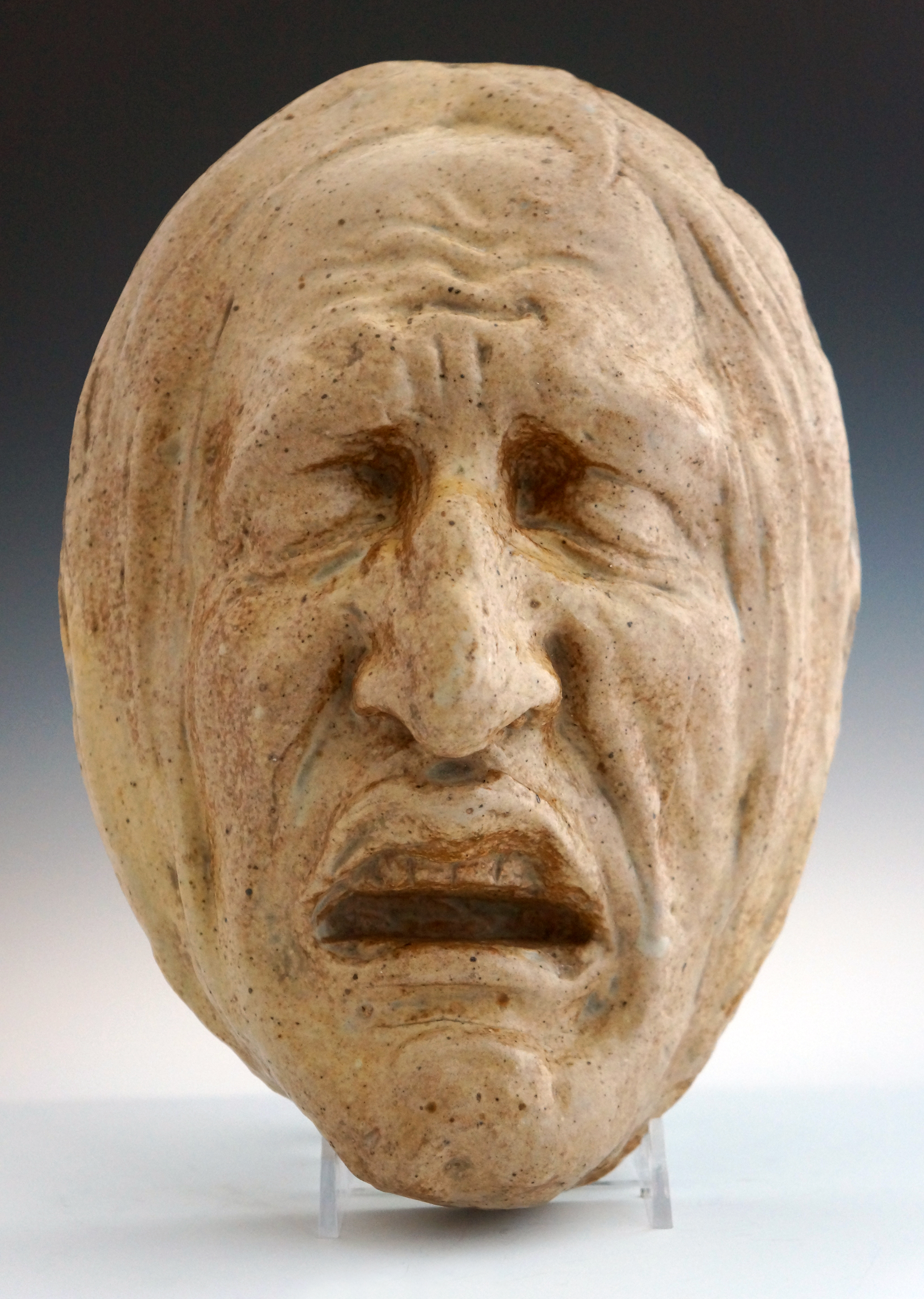
Stoneware mask with figure in agony or death expression by Jean Carriès.

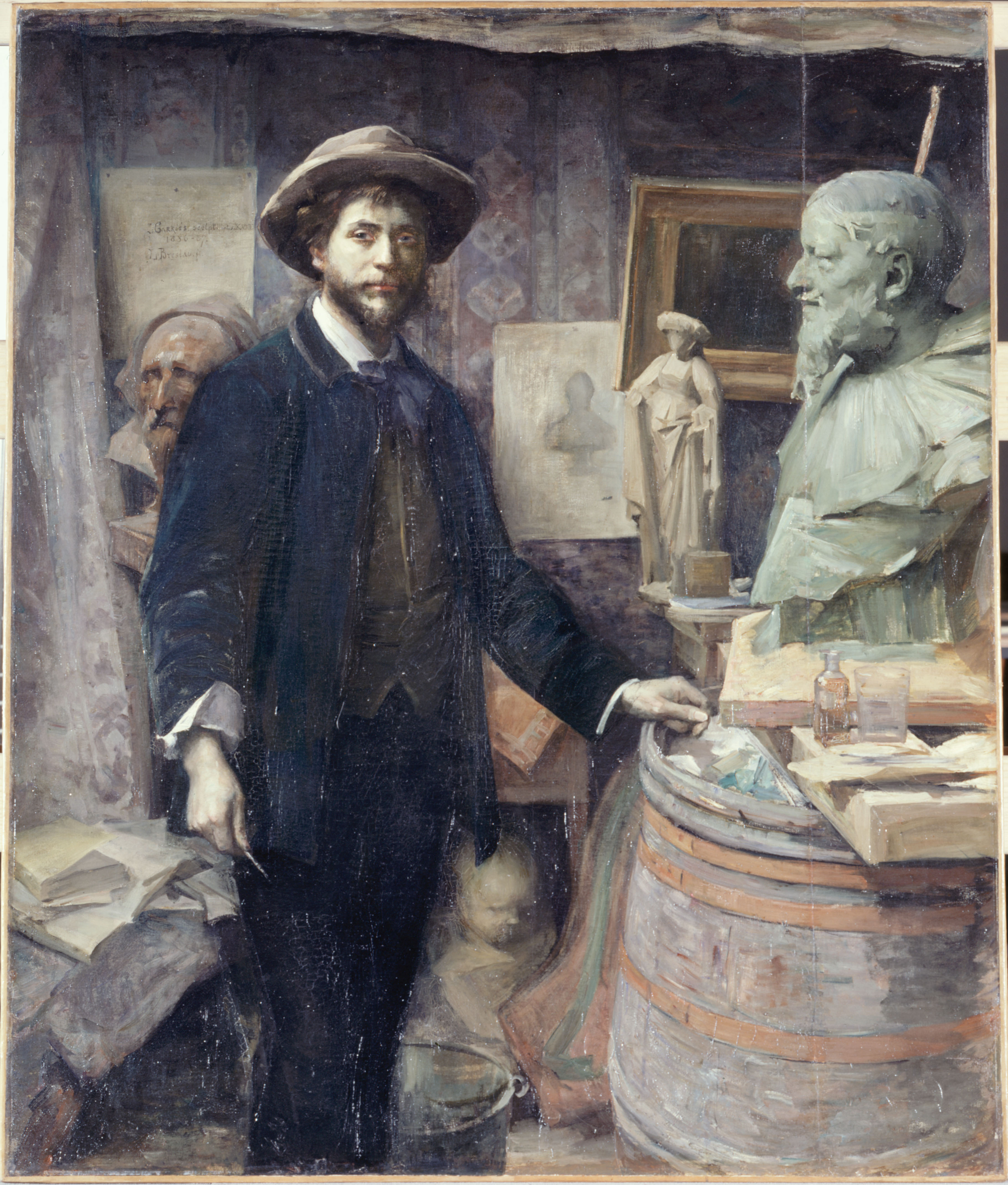
'Portrait de Jean Carriès dans son atelier' by Louise Catherine Breslau, Paris, Petit-Palais, Musée des Beaux-Arts de la Ville de Paris.

Jean-Joseph Marie Carriès (15 February 1855 – 1 July 1894) was a French sculptor, ceramist, and miniaturist. His ceramic work is mostly in stoneware, and part of the French art pottery movement, and includes many faces and heads, often with grotesque expressions, but he made several conventional pots, often with thick unctuous ash glaze effects in the Japanese style.

== Biography ==
Born in Lyon, Carriès was orphaned at age six and was raised in a Roman Catholic orphanage. He apprenticed with a local sculptor then in 1874 moved to Paris to study at the École des Beaux-Arts under Augustin-Alexandre Dumont. He first showed at the Paris Salon of 1875 and gained considerable recognition for his sculpted busts at the Paris Salons of 1879 and 1881. However, after seeing an exhibition of Japanese works at the 1878 World's Fair in Paris, he began to devote himself to the creation of polychrome Horror Masks.

Jean-Joseph Carriès was a friend of John Singer Sargent who painted his portrait in 1880.

His works exhibited at the Salon du Champ-de-Mars in 1892 were widely acclaimed and were acquired by the French Ministry of Culture and by a museum in Hamburg, Germany. That year, the government of France made him a member of the Legion of Honor. In 1894, a year after he had sculpted perhaps his most famous work entitled Faune, Jean-Joseph Carriès died of pleurisy at the age of thirty-nine. He is buried at Pere Lachaise cemetery in Paris.

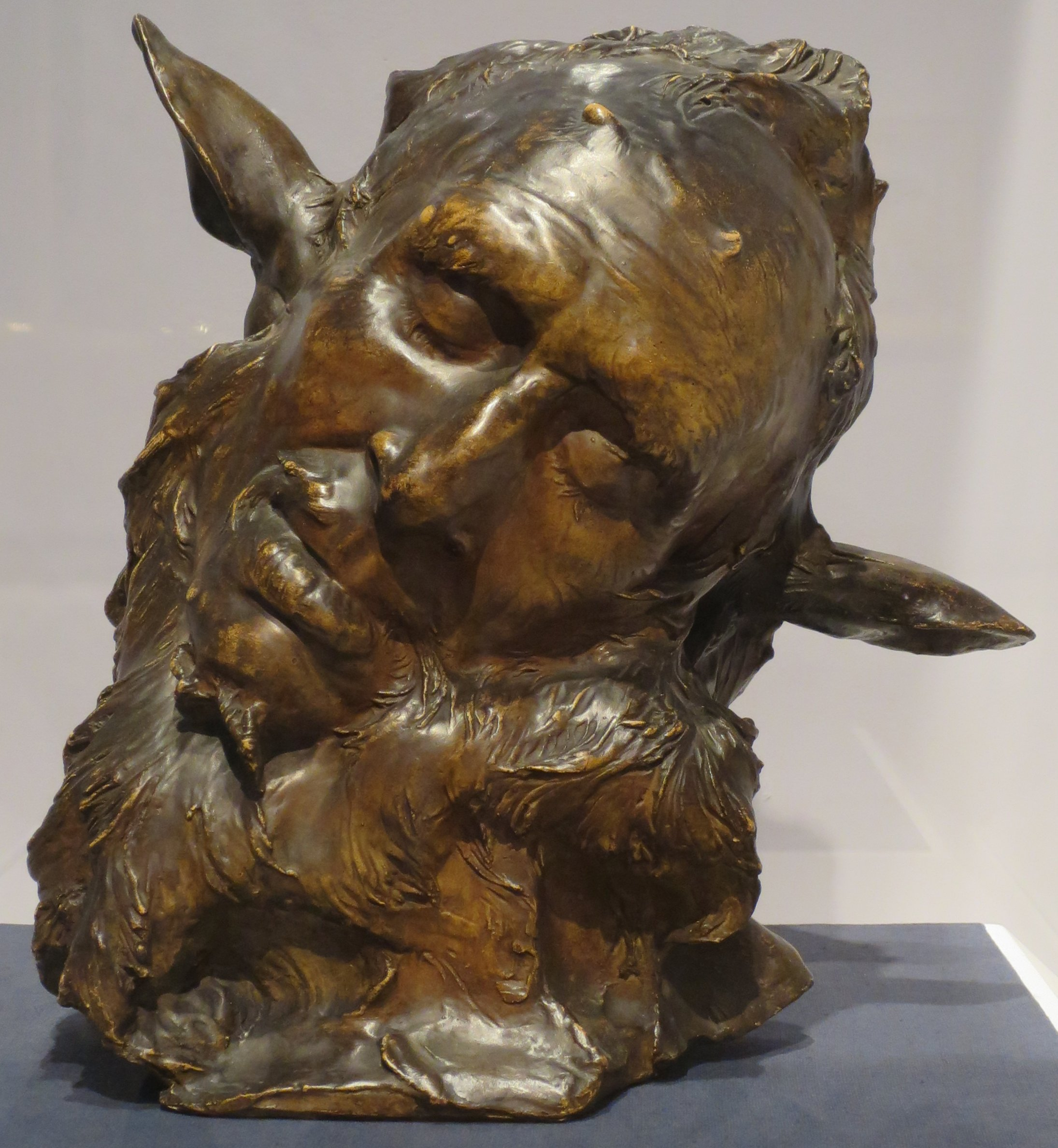
The Sleeping Faun, plaster with brown patina, 1885

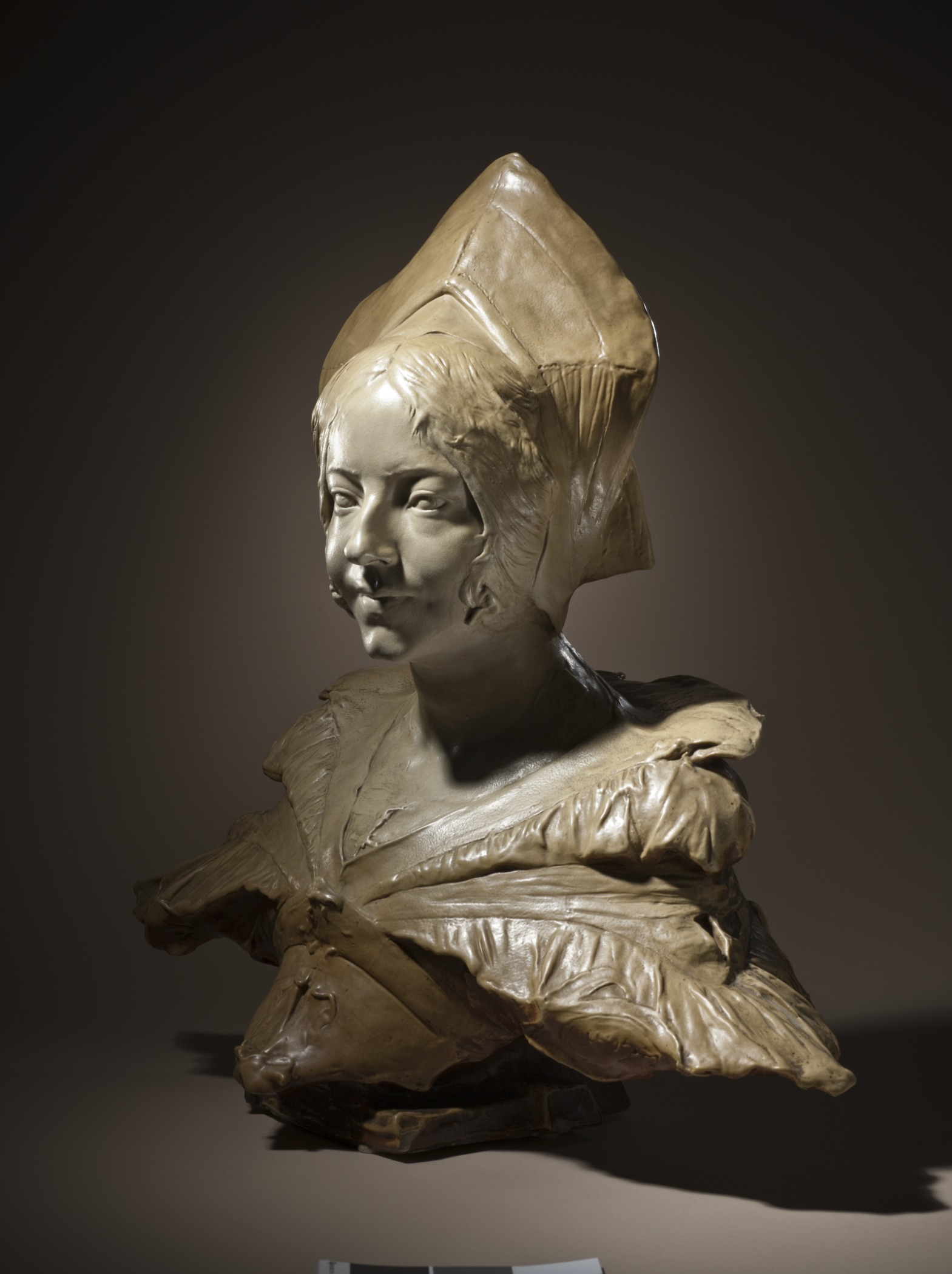
Portrait of Loyse Labbe, enamelled stoneware with a mat glaze, c. 1887

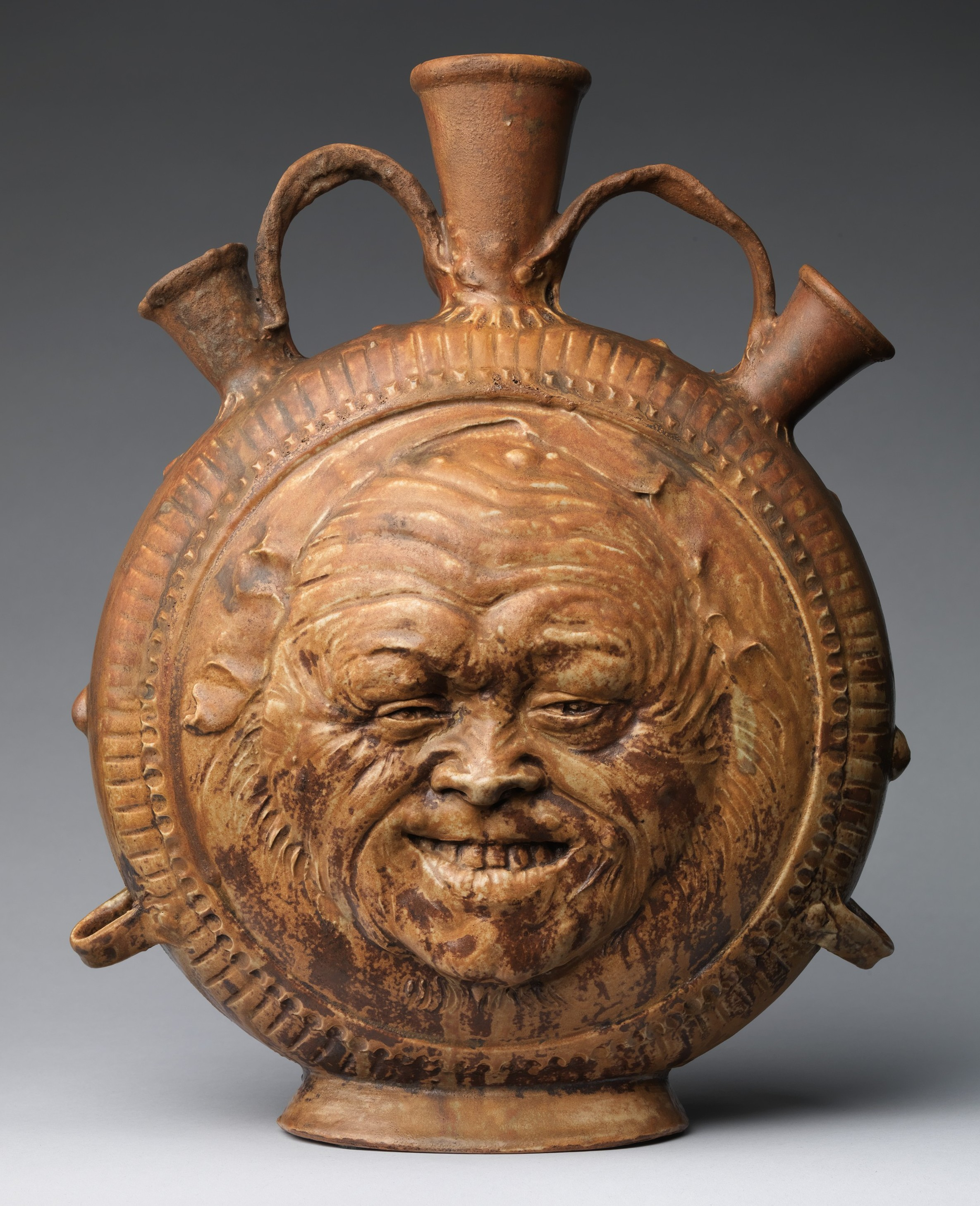
Stoneware flask, c. 1890

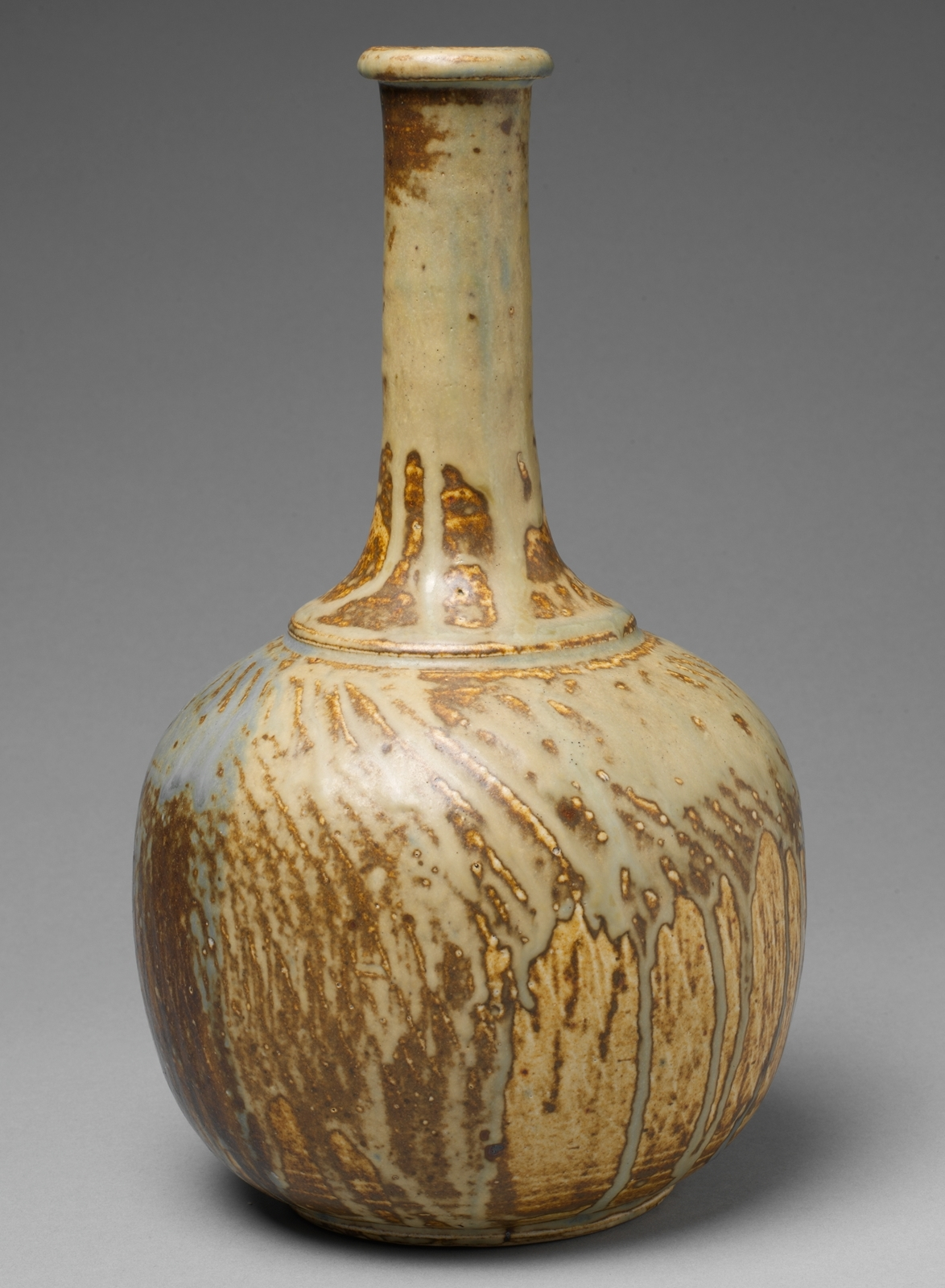
Stoneware vase with ash glaze, 1890–94

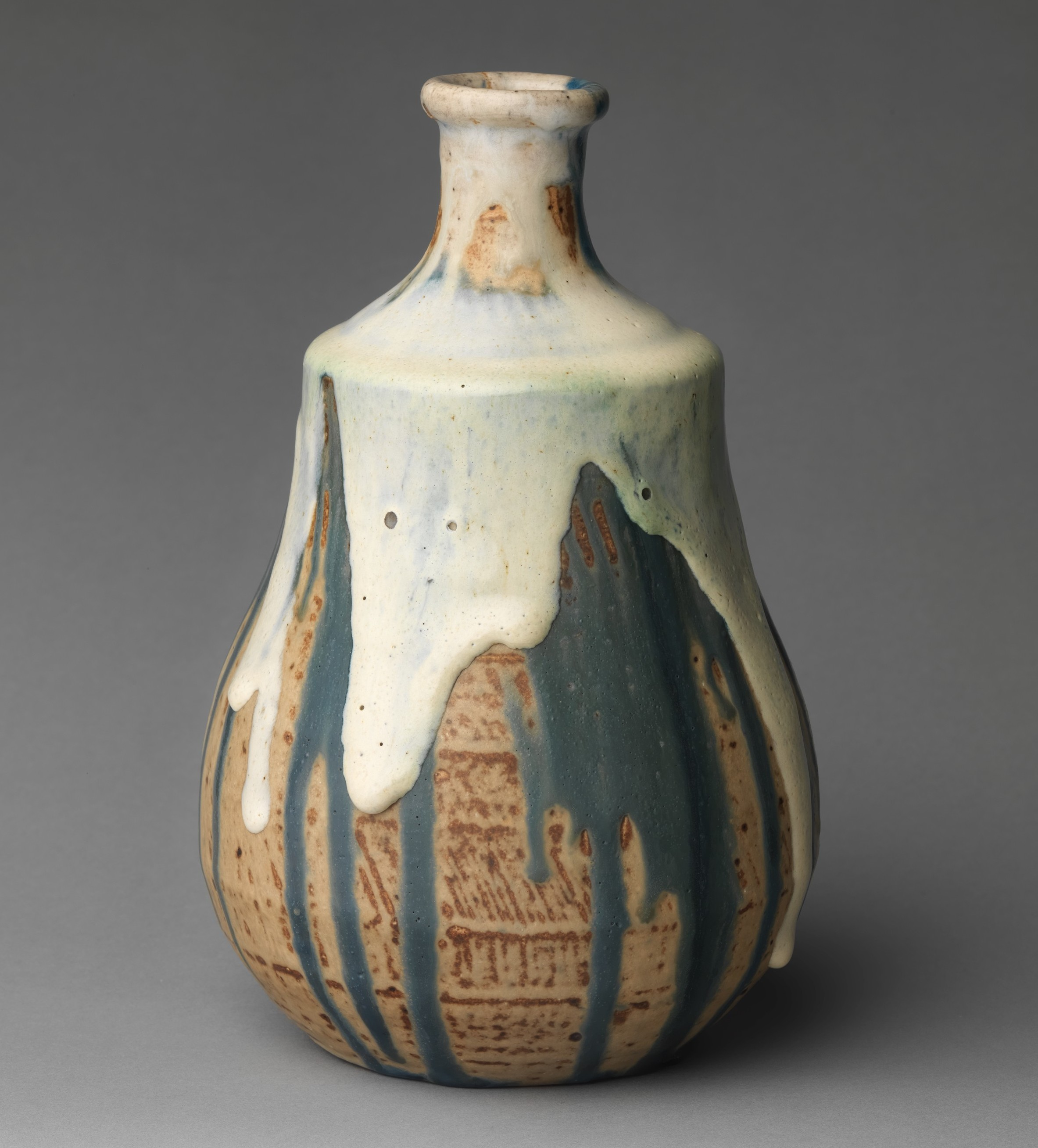
Stoneware vase with ash glaze, c. 1890

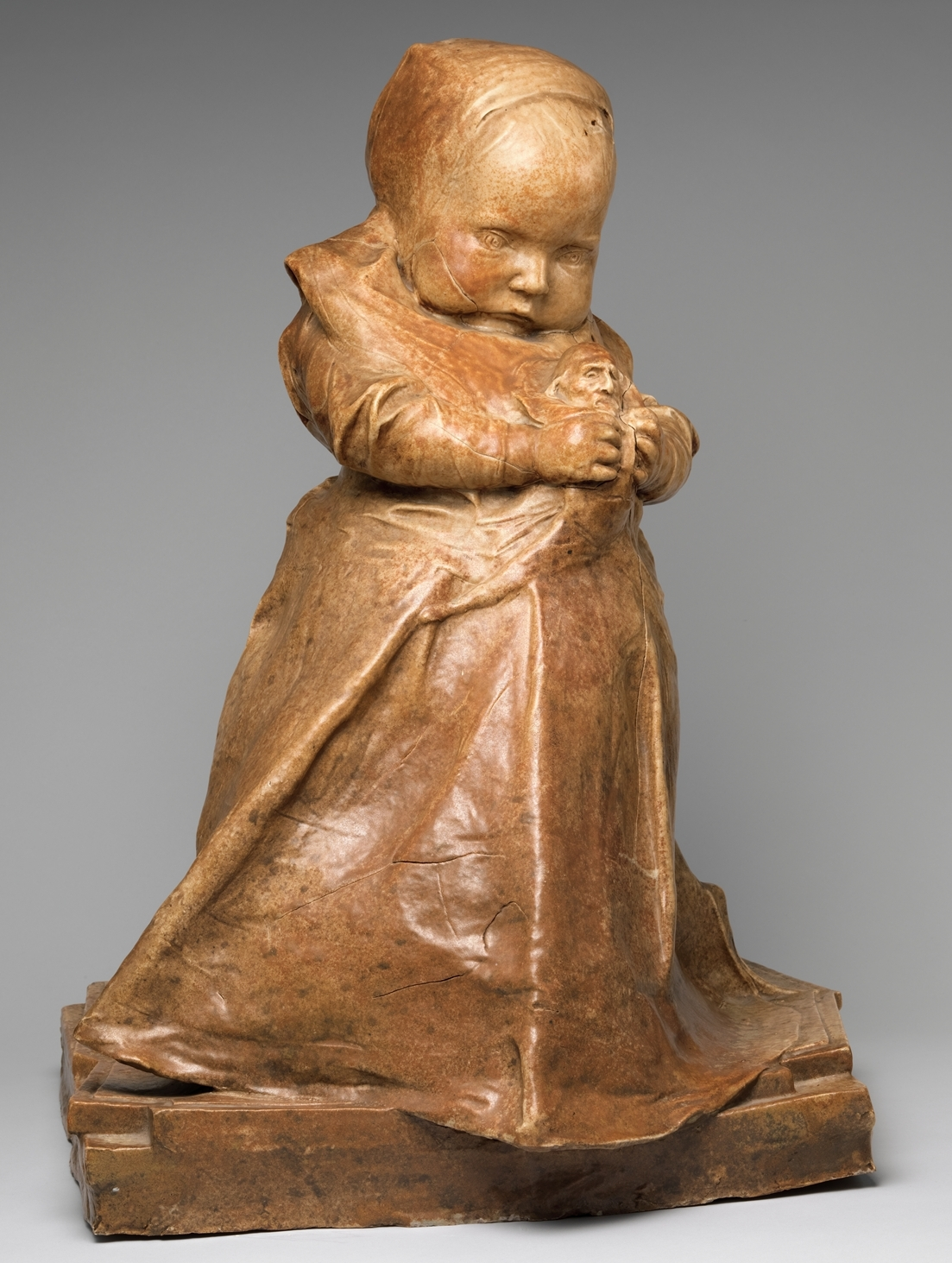
The Infanta, stoneware, 1890–94

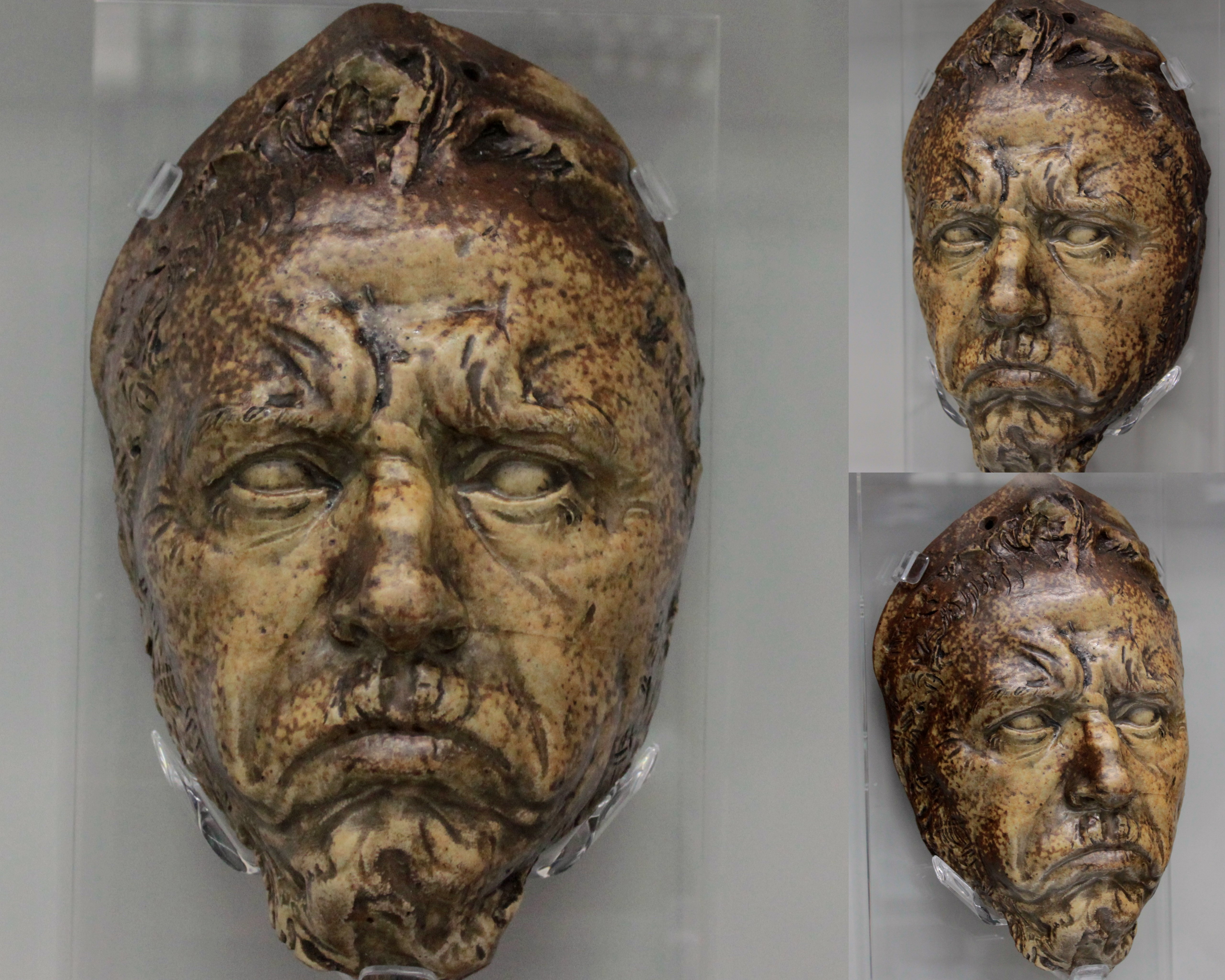
Self-portrait mask, enamelled stoneware, 1890–92

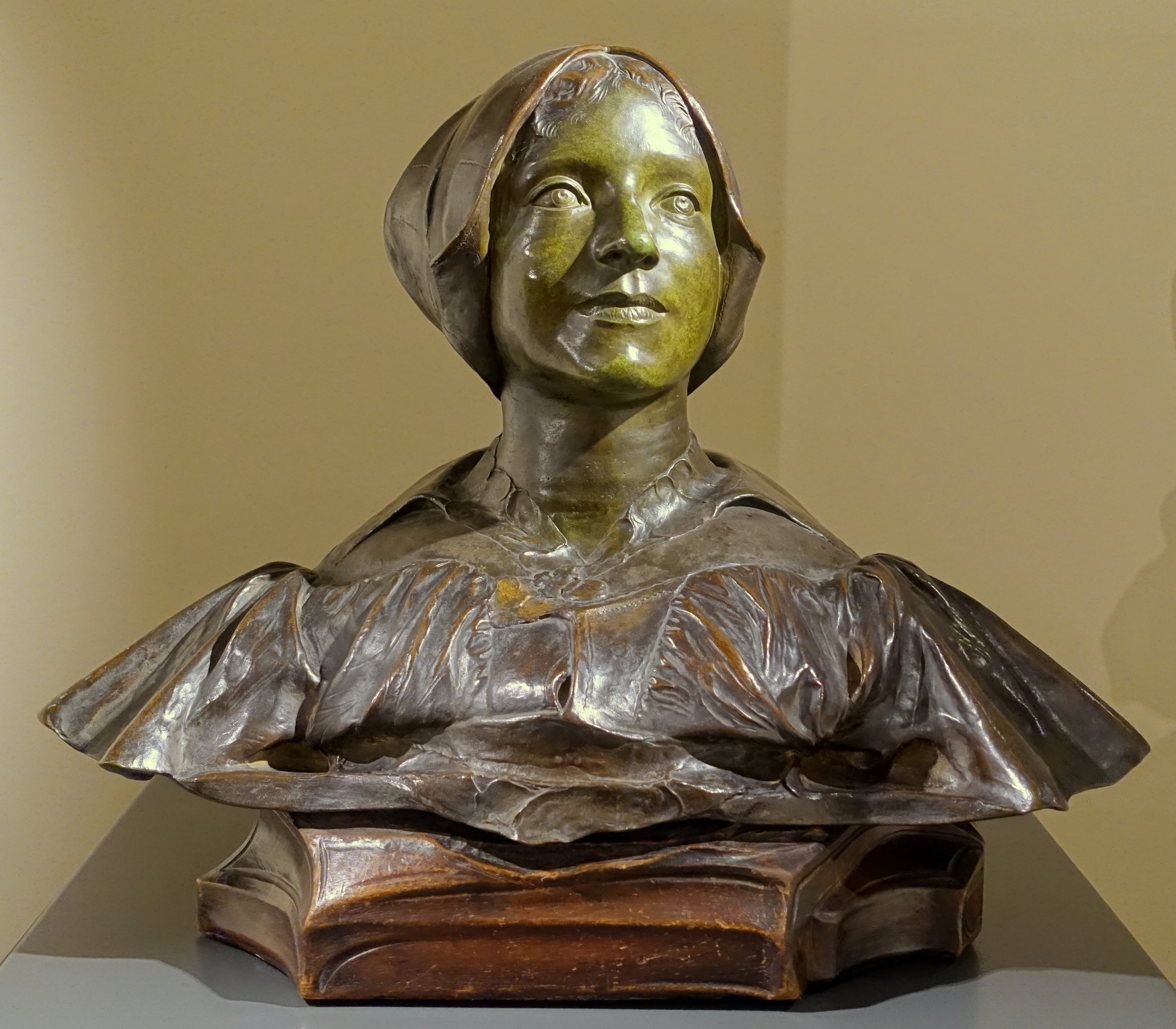
Dutch woman, bronze, 1893

== Bibliography ==
- Amélie Simier, Jean Carriès (1855-1894) : La matière de l'étrange, Paris Musées, 2007.
