= Place Louise-Catherine-Breslau-et-Madeleine-Zillhardt =

Square in Paris

Coordinates: 48°51′18″N 2°20′16″E

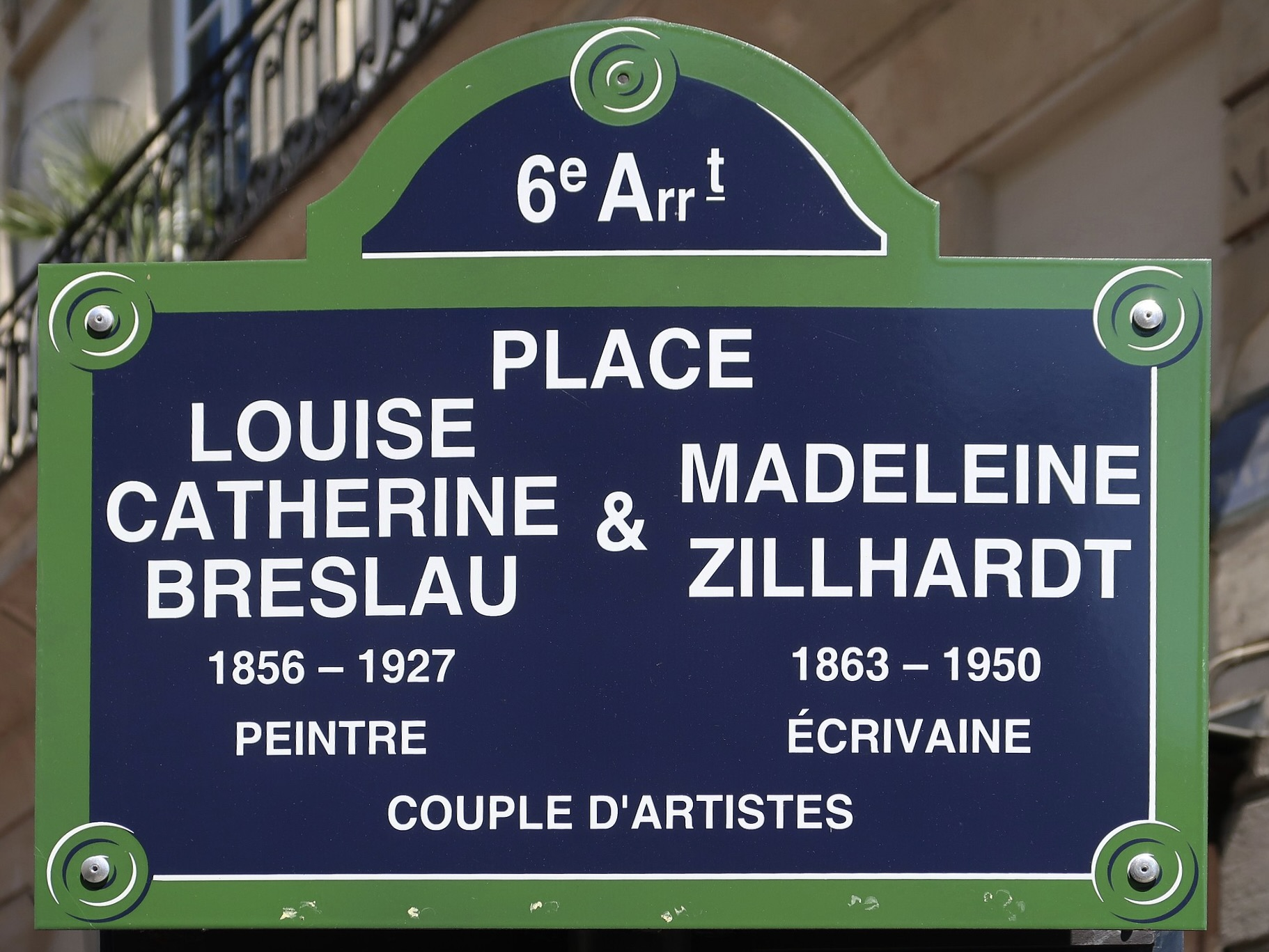
- Louise Catherine Breslau and Madeleine Zillhardt, artist couple

- Location within Paris
- Arrondissement: 6th
- Quarter: La Monnaie, Saint-Germain-des-Prés
- From: Rue Dauphine
- To: Rue de Seine

The Place Louise-Catherine-Breslau-et-Madeleine-Zillhardt is situated in the 6th arrondissement of Paris, on a crowdy crossroad between the districts of La Monnaie and Saint-Germain-des-Prés.

== History ==
The place is named in memory of German painter Louise Catherine Breslau and French writer Madeleine Zillhardt, by vote of the Council of Paris.

== Features ==
Parisian famous Café de Buci is situated on the square.

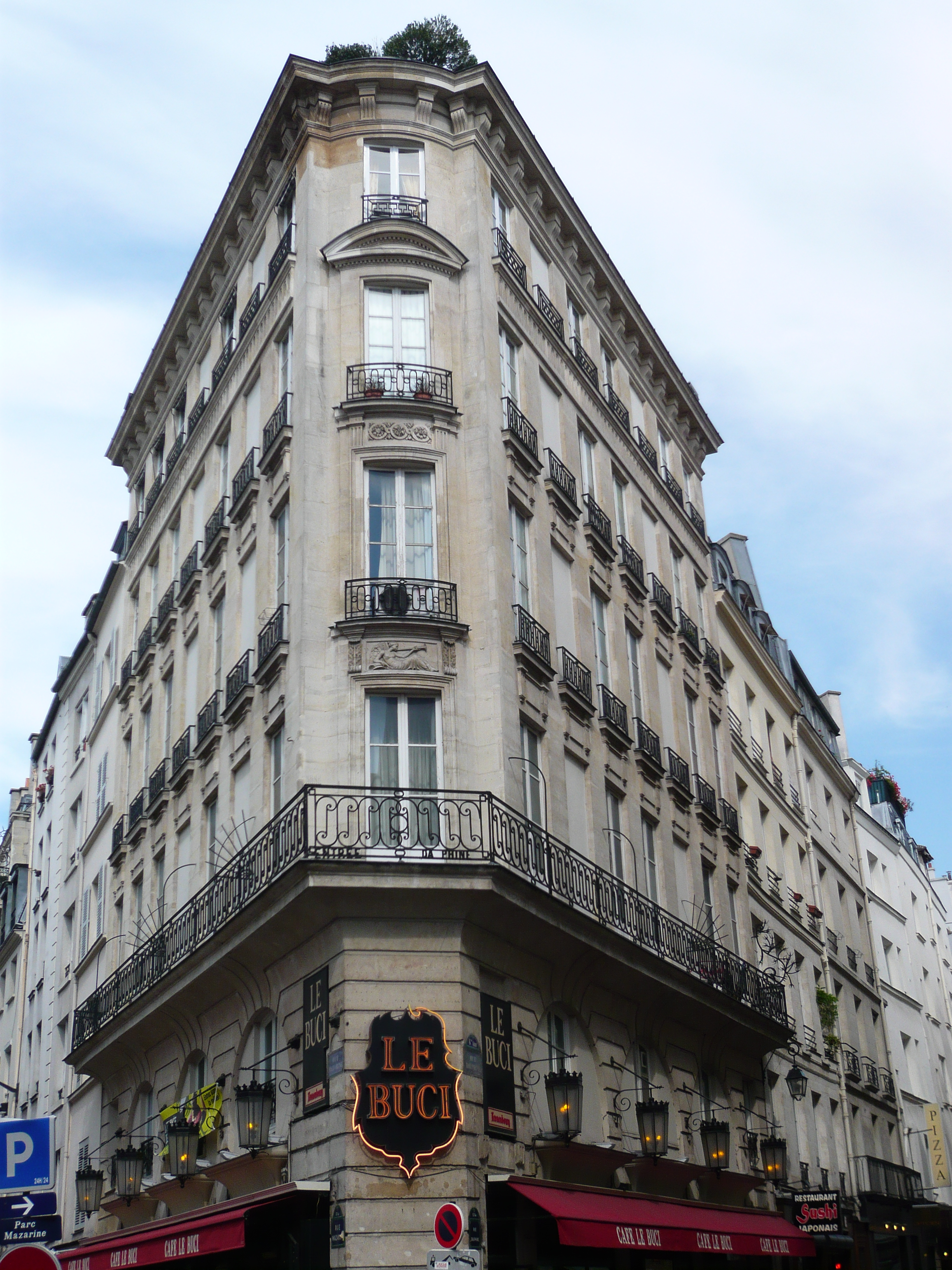
Café de Buci
