= Madeleine Zillhardt =

French artist

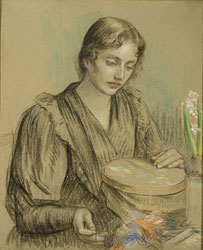
- Madeleine Zillhardt by Louise Catherine Breslau. Musée des Beaux-Arts de Dijon.
- Born: 10 June 1863; Saint-Quentin, Hauts-de-France, France
- Died: 16 April 1950 (aged 86); Neuilly-sur-Seine, Ile-de-France, France
- Known for: Writing, painting
- Spouse: Louise Catherine Breslau
- Memorials: place Louise Catherine Breslau & Madeleine Zillhardt, Paris, 6th arrondissement

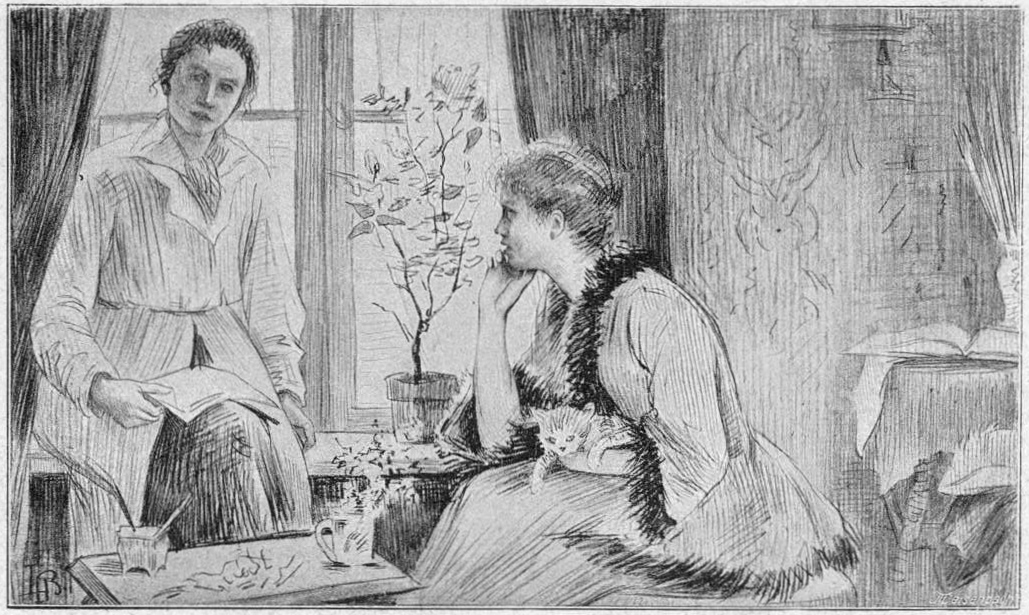
Drawing for 'La Vie Pensive' with Madeleine Zillhardt by Louise Catherine Breslau

Madeleine Zillhardt (June 10, 1863 – April 16, 1950) was a French artist, writer, decorator and painter. Her life and career are linked to another artist, the German-Swiss painter Louise Catherine Breslau, of whom she was the companion, the muse and the inspirer. They lived together for more than forty years, and their lives turned towards the arts. She was the sister of painter Jenny Zillhardt.

== Biography ==
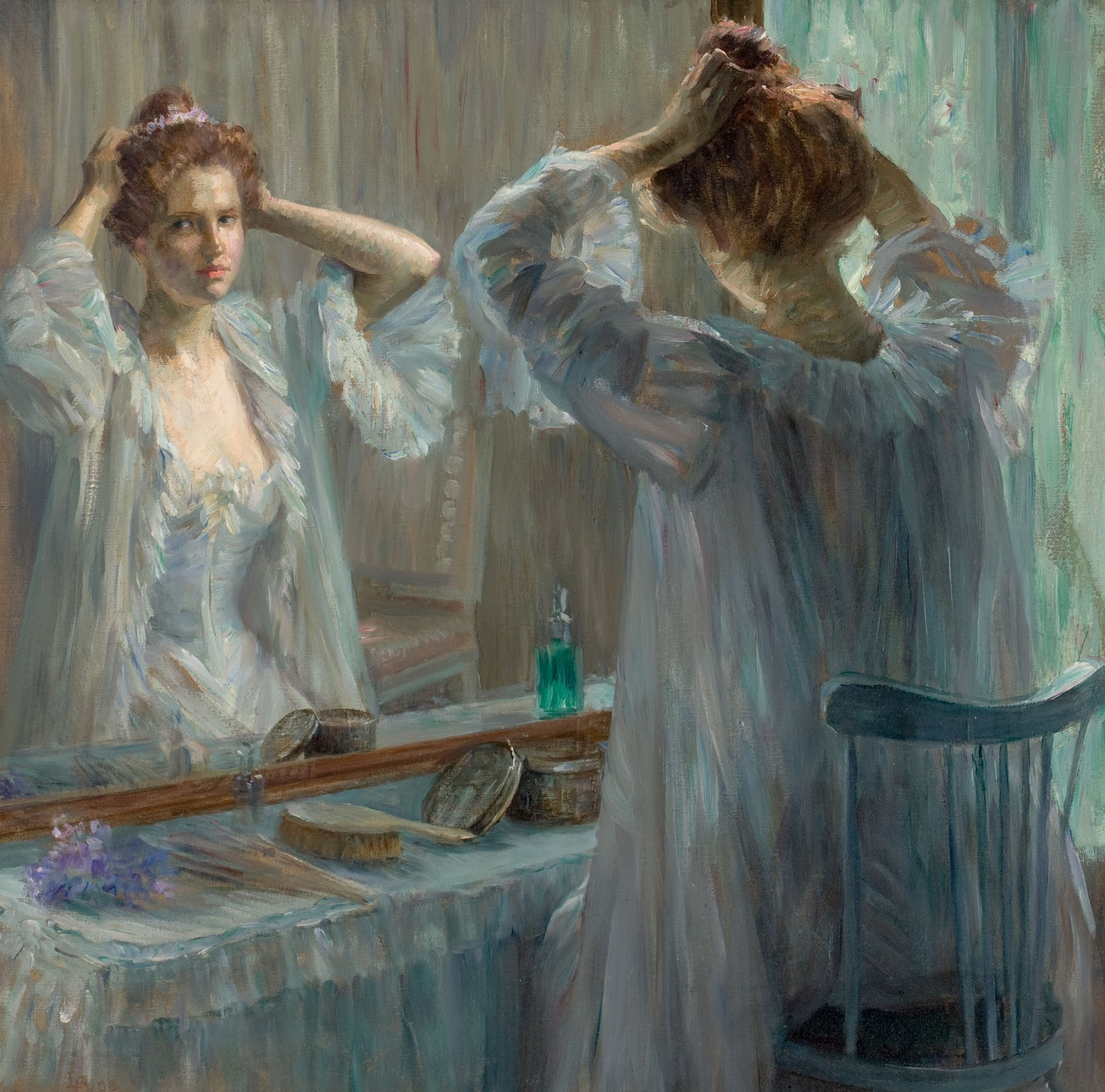
Madeleine Zillhardt by Louise Catherine Breslau. La Toilette (1898).

Madeleine Zillhardt was born in Saint-Quentin, France. She studied at the Académie Julian, art school in Paris; at the time the only institution of art education open to women in Paris. Her sister Jenny Zillhardt also studied there. She met there young artists like her: Anna Klumpke, Hermine David, Agnes Goodsir, Sarah Purser, Marie Bashkirtseff, and especially her "rival", Louise Catherine Breslau.

In 1884, Zillhardt asked Breslau to make her portrait. They would not leave each other and moved permanently together in 1886. In 1887, Breslau performed 'Contre Jour', one of her masterpieces, representing the couple she formed with Zillhardt in their intimacy. The painting was bought by the Swiss government in 1896, and is today held by the Museum of Fine Arts Bern. In 1908, Breslau painted 'La Vie pensive', another work of the couple, now displayed at the Cantonal Museum of Fine Arts in Lausanne.

Zillhardt became one of the most original decorators of her time and Louise Breslau had a huge success in the world of painting. The two women become an essential couple in the Parisian art scene and receive their artist friends: Henri Fantin-Latour, Auguste Rodin, and Edgar Degas, of whom Zillhardt wrote a biography. During the First World War, Madeleine Zillhardt distinguished herself in the decorative arts for her "patriotic faience", in support to Clemenceau or denouncing the bombing of civilians, like Fluctuat nec mergitur, Paris bombed, executed in 1918, now part of the collections of the French national Museum of Air and Space. She also went back to painting with Breslau. They painted portraits of soldiers, nurses and doctors on the way to the front to give to their families before they left.

After the war, the health of Breslau declined until her death on May 12, 1927 in Paris.

Zillhardt spent the rest of her life perpetuating the work of her companion, donating to various museums. Zillhardt allowed the work of her partner to be dispersed and to appear today in international collections. Zillhardt died in 1950 in Neuilly-sur-Seine.

== The barge 'Louise-Catherine' ==
In 1928, Zillhardt bought the concrete barge 'Liège' in Paris in order to make it available to the Salvation Army. With the support of Winnaretta Singer, princesse de Polignac and heiress of the company of sewing machines Singer, the barge was rehabilitated by Le Corbusier in 1929, with his student, Japonese architect Kunio Maekawa. According to the will of Madeleine Zillhardt, the boat took the name Louise-Catherine in tribute to Breslau and became a refuge for the homeless in winter and a summer camp for children, moored in Paris on the banks of the Seine, at the Pont des Arts and at the Pont d'Austerlitz.

In 2006, the boat was taken over the Fondation Le Corbusier. In 2018, it accidentally sank on February 10, during the flood of the Seine in Paris. The Louise-Catherine barge is still located at the Port of Austerlitz, in the 13th arrondissement, hoping for a renovation project.

== Legacy ==
- A street in Paris is named 'place Louise Catherine Breslau & Madeleine Zillhardt', in the 6th arrondissement (Saint-Germain-des-Prés).
- In Saint-Quentin (home town of Madeleine Zillhardt), the 'Musée Antoine Lécuyer' exhibits 'Sous la lampe. Portrait de Madeleine Zillhardt'.

== Bibliography ==
- Madeleine Zillhardt. Louise-Catherine Breslau et ses amis, Paris, Éditions des Portiques, 1932.
- Madeleine Zillhardt. Monsieur Edgar Degas, Paris, L'Echoppe, new edition 2015.
