= Jenny Zillhardt =

French painter

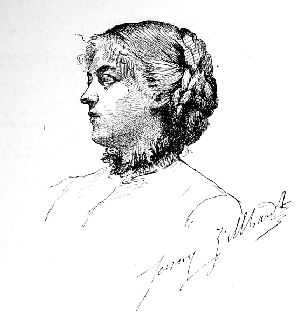
- self-portrait
- Born: 16 March 1857; Saint-Quentin, Aisne, France
- Died: February 1939 (aged 81–82); Neuilly-sur-Seine, France
- Occupation: painter
- Relatives: Madeleine Zillhardt (sister)
- Awards: Legion of Honor

Jenny Zillhardt or Marguerite Valentine (16 March 1857 – February 1939) was a French painter.

== Biography ==
Marguerite-Valentine-Jenny Zillhardt (Jenny Zillhardt) was born at Saint-Quentin in the Aisne department of France. She began studying painting in 1877 at the Académie Julian in Paris, alongside Louise Catherine Breslau and Marie Bashkirtseff. She studied under Tony Robert-Fleury.

She first exhibited at the Paris Salon of 1878 with a work entitled Deux amis. From that time forward, her frequent participation in the Salon garnered her several sales.

Zillhardt was part of the French female group of artists whose work was represented at the 1893 Chicago World's Fair, an exhibit in the Woman's Building.

Her works were included in the collections of the Musée d'Orsay, the museum of Langres, and the museum of Saint-Quentin.

She was made an officer of public instruction (officier de l'instruction publique) in 1910, and received the Legion of Honor (chevalier de la légion d'honneur) in 1930.

Her painting Régalez-vous mesdames was included in the 1905 work of British art historian Walter Shaw Sparrow, Women Painters of the World.

Zillhardt died in February 1939 at Neuilly-sur-Seine.

She was the sister of Madeleine Zillhardt, model and companion of Louise Catherine Breslau.

== Collections ==
Zillhardt's work is held in the following public collection:

- Jeune fille au chat, musée d'Orsay

== Gallery ==
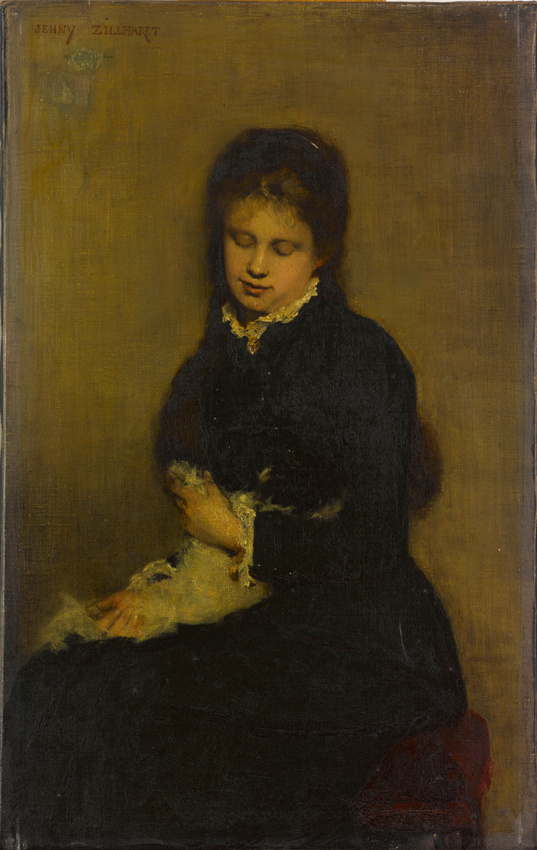
Jeune Fille au chat

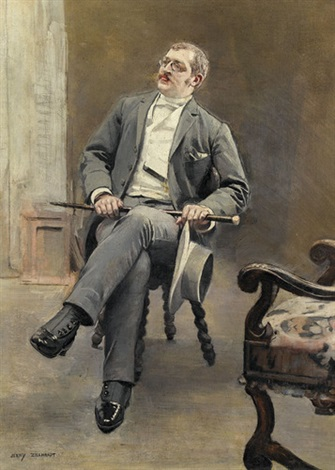
Jeune Compositeur

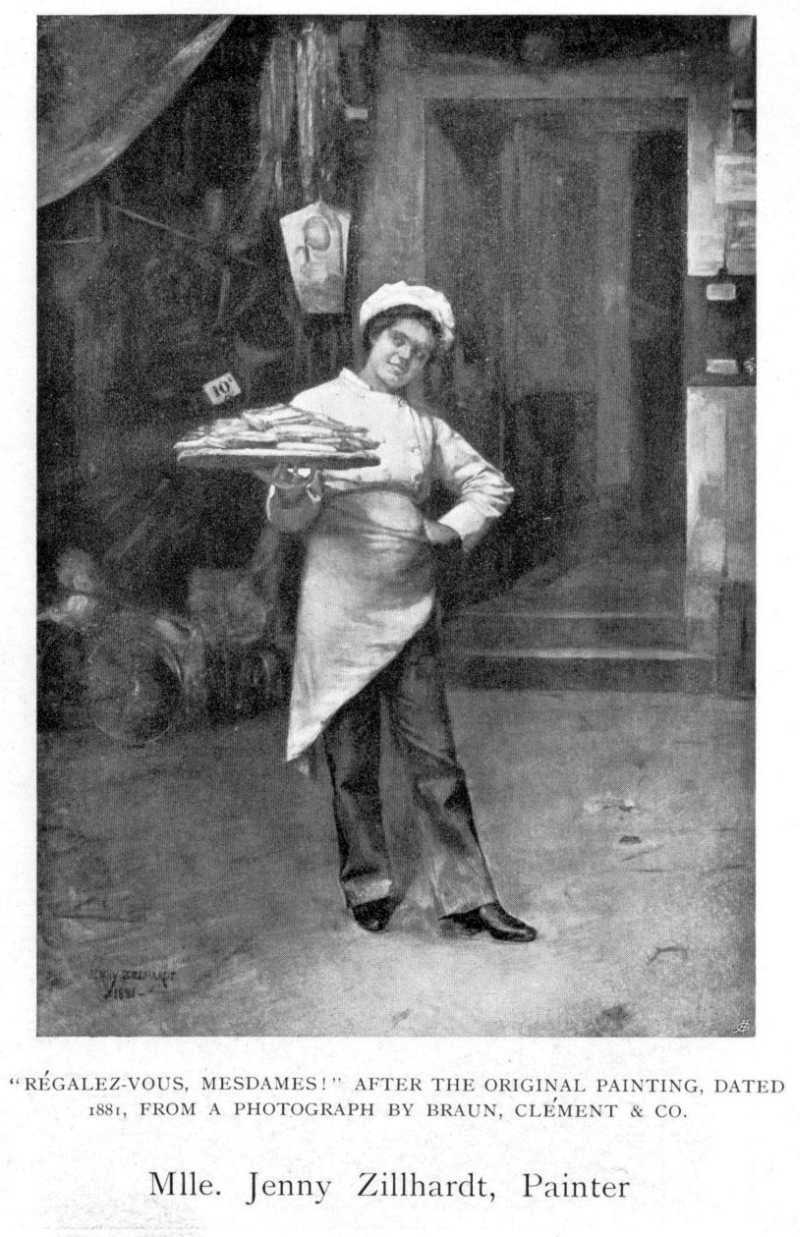
Régalez-vous mesdames. Print after a page of Women Painters of the World. 1905.
