= Louise Catherine Breslau =

German-born Swiss painter

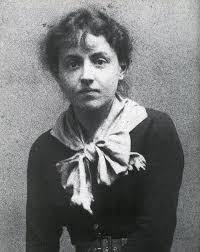
- Louise Catherine Breslau
- Born: Maria Luise Katharina Breslau; 6 December 1856; Munich, Kingdom of Bavaria
- Died: 12 May 1927 (aged 70); Paris, France
- Known for: Painting
- Movement: Impressionnism
- Spouse: Madeleine Zillhardt

Louise Catherine Breslau (6 December 1856 – 12 May 1927) was a German-born Swiss painter, who learned drawing to pass the time while bedridden with chronic asthma. She studied art at the Académie Julian in Paris, and exhibited at the salon of the Société Nationale des Beaux-Arts, where she became a respected colleague of noted figures such as Edgar Degas and Anatole France.

== Biography ==
=== Early years ===
Born Maria Luise Katharina Breslau into an apparently-assimilated Munich-based German Jewish family of Polish Jewish descent. In 1858, when Breslau was two years old, her father accepted the position of professor and head physician of Obstetrics and Gynecology at the University of Zurich, and the family moved to Switzerland. In December 1866, Dr. Breslau died suddenly from a staph infection contracted while performing a post-mortem examination. Suffering from asthma all her life, Breslau turned to drawing as a child to help pass the time while confined to her bed. She spent her childhood in Zürich, Switzerland, and as an adult made Paris her home where she also stopped using her first name "Maria".

Lydia Escher (1858–1892) was a friend of Louise Breslau.

=== Education ===
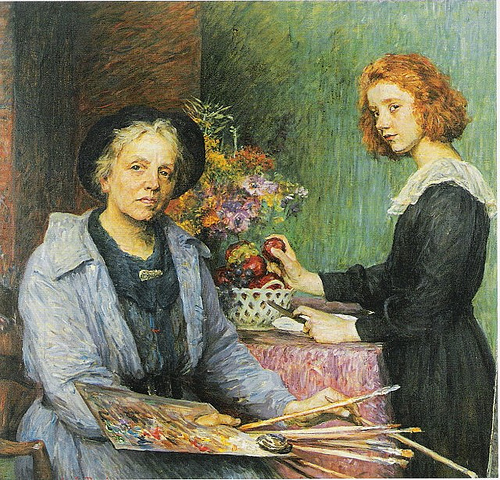
The Artist and Her Model

After her father's death, Breslau was sent to a convent near Lake Constance in hopes of alleviating her chronic asthma. It is believed that during her long stays at the convent her artistic talents were awakened. In the late 19th century young bourgeois ladies were expected to be educated in the domestic arts including drawing and playing the piano. These were admirable attributes for a respectable wife and mother. Pursuing a career was quite unusual and often prohibited. By 1874, after having taken drawing lessons from a local Swiss artist, Eduard Pfyffer (1836–1899), Breslau knew that she would have to leave Switzerland if she wanted to realize her dream of seriously studying art. One of the few places available for young women to study was at the Académie Julian in Paris.

At the Académie, Breslau was noticed by her instructors, and her progress was a source of rivalry with some of her classmates, including the Russian Marie Bashkirtseff. Among her fellow students were the Irish artist Sarah Purser, with whom she maintained a friendship for the rest of her life, as well as Sophie Schaeppi of Switzerland, Maria Feller of Italy, Jenny Zillhardt, and her sister Madeleine Zillhardt.

In 1879, with a portrait “Tout passé”, Breslau was the only student from the Académie Julian women's atelier to debut at the Paris Salon. “Tout passé” was a self-portrait that included her two friends. Shortly afterwards Breslau had changed her name to Louise Catherine, opened her own atelier, and was becoming a regular contributor and medal winner at the annual Salon. Due to her success at the Salon and favorable notice from the critics, Breslau received numerous commissions from wealthy Parisians. She joined the Salon de la Société Nationale des Beaux-Arts in Paris in 1890, not only exhibiting in its salons but also serving on the jury. She eventually became the third woman artist, and the first foreign woman artist to be bestowed France's Legion of Honor award.

Portrait of Ernst Josephson

Over the years, Breslau became a well-regarded colleague to some of the day's most popular artists and writers including Edgar Degas and Anatole France. One person who was very special in Breslau's life was Madeleine Zillhardt with whom she spent over forty years. Madeleine, a fellow student at the Académie Julian, became Breslau's muse, model, confidant, and supporter. Zillhardt inherited Breslau's estate and later donated sixty of the artist's pastels and drawings to the Musée des Beaux-Arts in Dijon. In 1932, Zillhardt published a book about Louise Breslau titled Louise Catherine Breslau et ses amis (Louise Catherine Breslau and her Friends).

Breslau died in 1927, and in 1928, the École des Beaux-Arts in Paris honored her with a retrospective. Her work was also featured in a 1932 retrospective at Galerie Charpentier dedicated to women who trained at the Académie Julian.

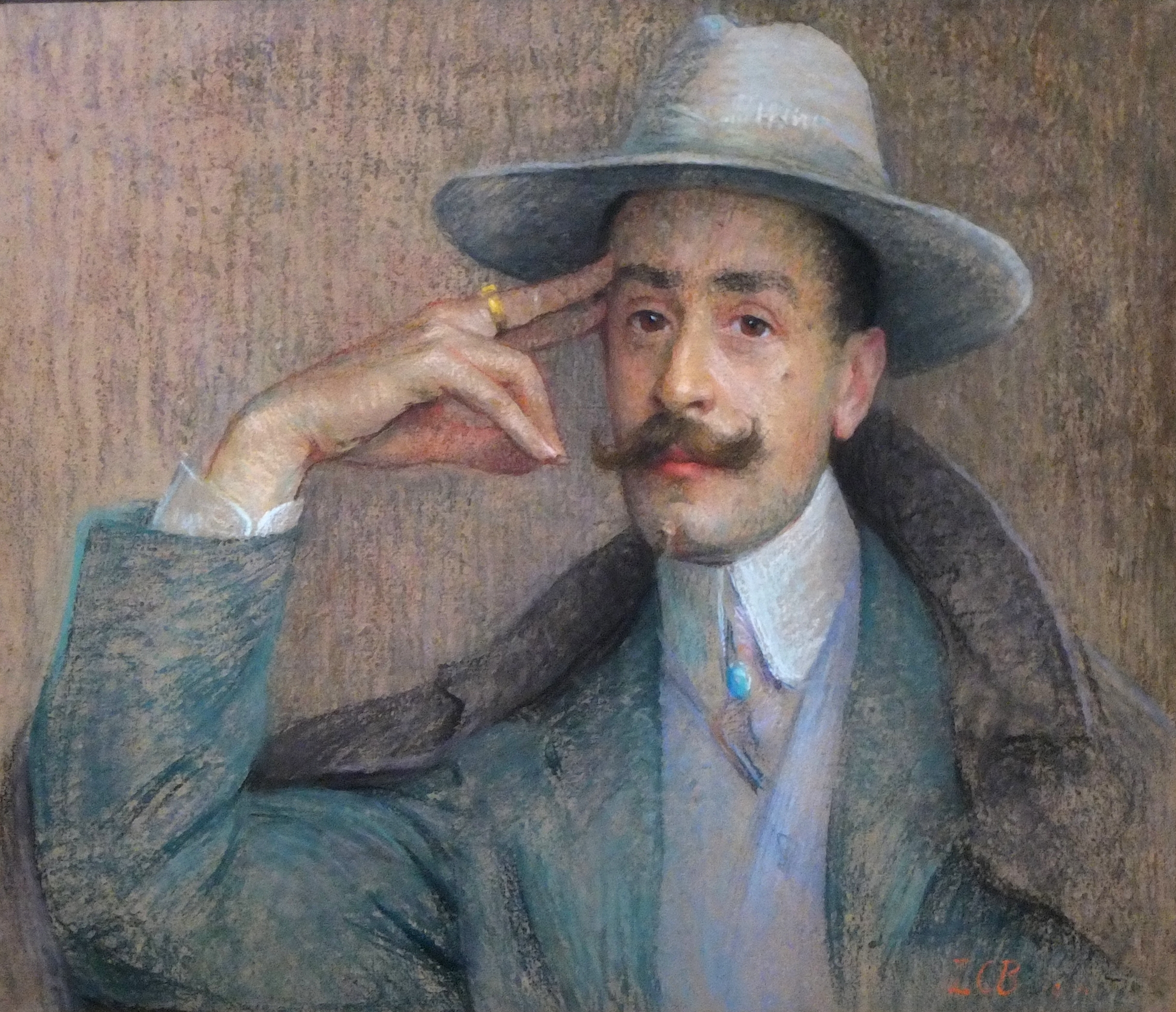
Gabriel Yturride (pastel,1904)

=== Personal life ===
During World War I, Breslau and Zillhardt remained at their home outside Paris, in Neuilly-sur-Seine. Although she naturalised to Switzerland many years earlier, she showed her loyalty for the French by drawing numerous portraits of French soldiers and nurses on their way to the Front. After the war, Breslau retired from the public and spent much of her time painting flowers from her garden and entertaining friends.

In 1927 Breslau died after a long illness. According to her wishes, Madeleine Zillhardt inherited much of Breslau's estate. Breslau was buried next to her mother in the small town of Baden, in Canton Aargau, Switzerland.

== Legacy ==
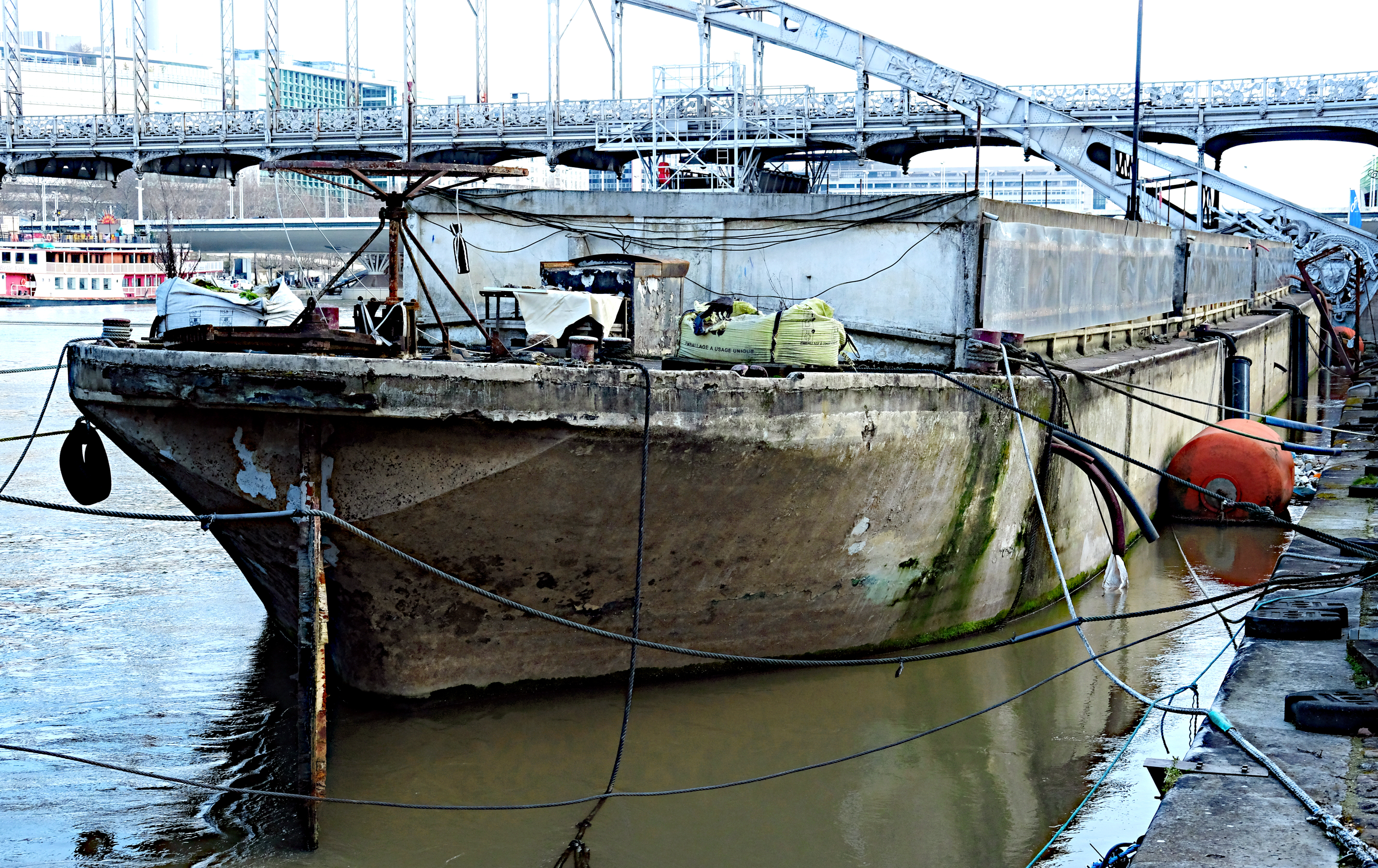
The barge 'Louise-Catherine' in march 2024.

- A street is named Place Louise Catherine Breslau & Madeleine Zillhardt' in Paris, France (neighbourood of Saint-Germain-des-Prés, 6th arrondissement of the French capital).
- The barge 'Louise-Catherine' in Paris is named in her memory by Madeleine Zillhardt. She bought it with the support of Winnareta Singer. The boat was redesigned by Le Corbusier and was held by the Salvation Army in order to shelter homeless people. Now property of the Fondation Le Corbusier, the barge sank during the February 2018 flood of the Seine, now waiting for renovation.
- Breslau was included in the 2018 exhibit Women in Paris 1850-1900.

== Selected works ==
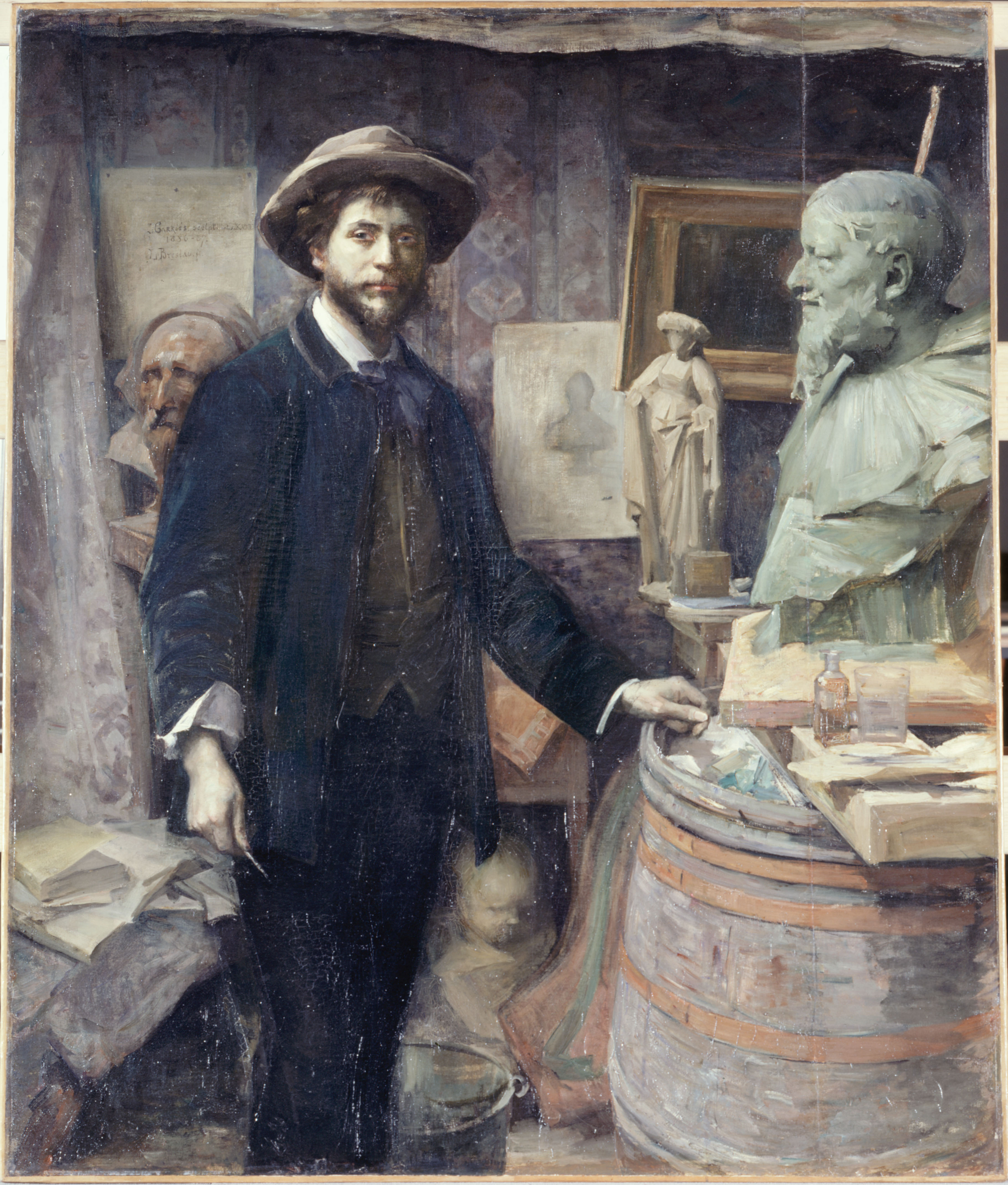
Sculptor Jean Carriès
in his Studio

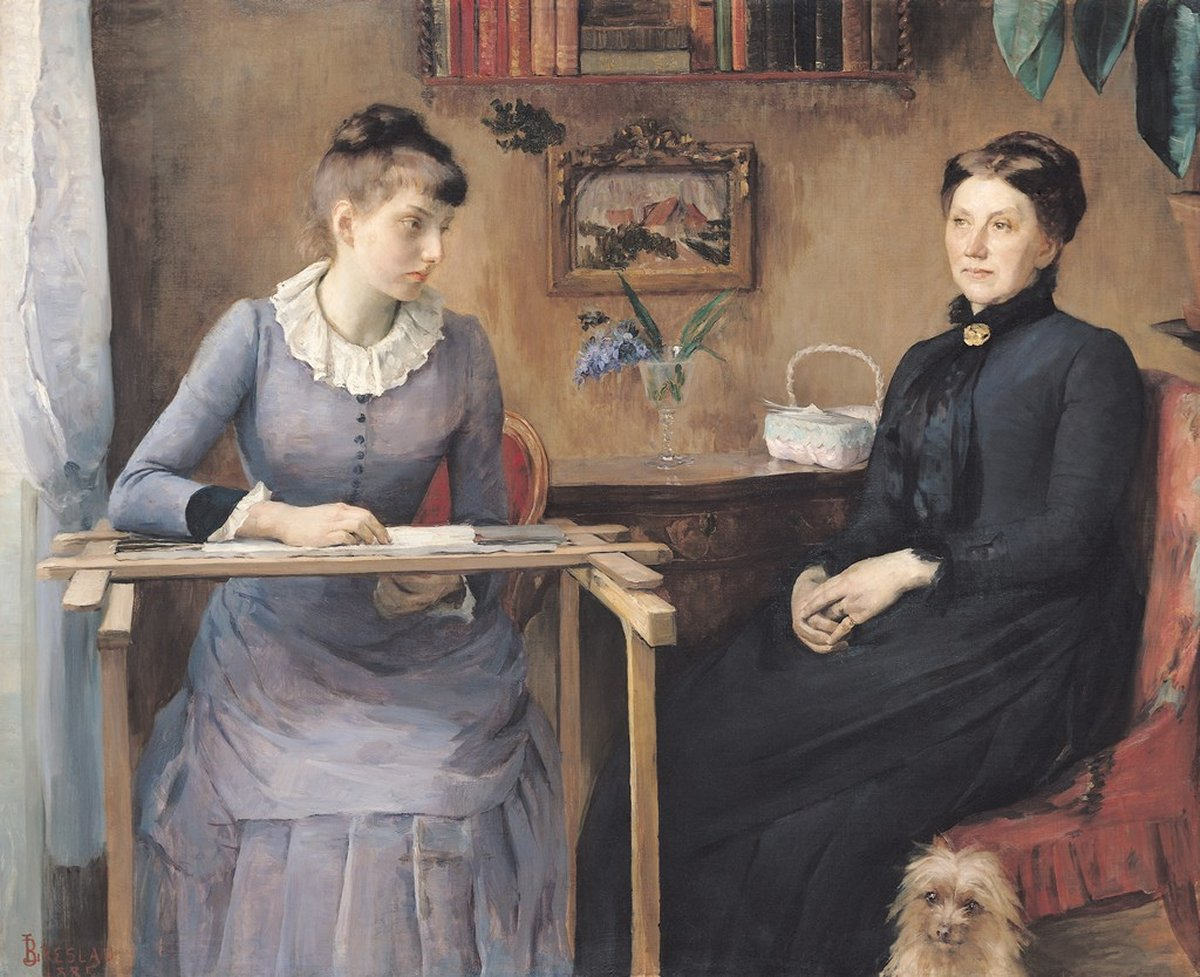
Intimacy (Mother & sister of Louise Catherine Breslau)

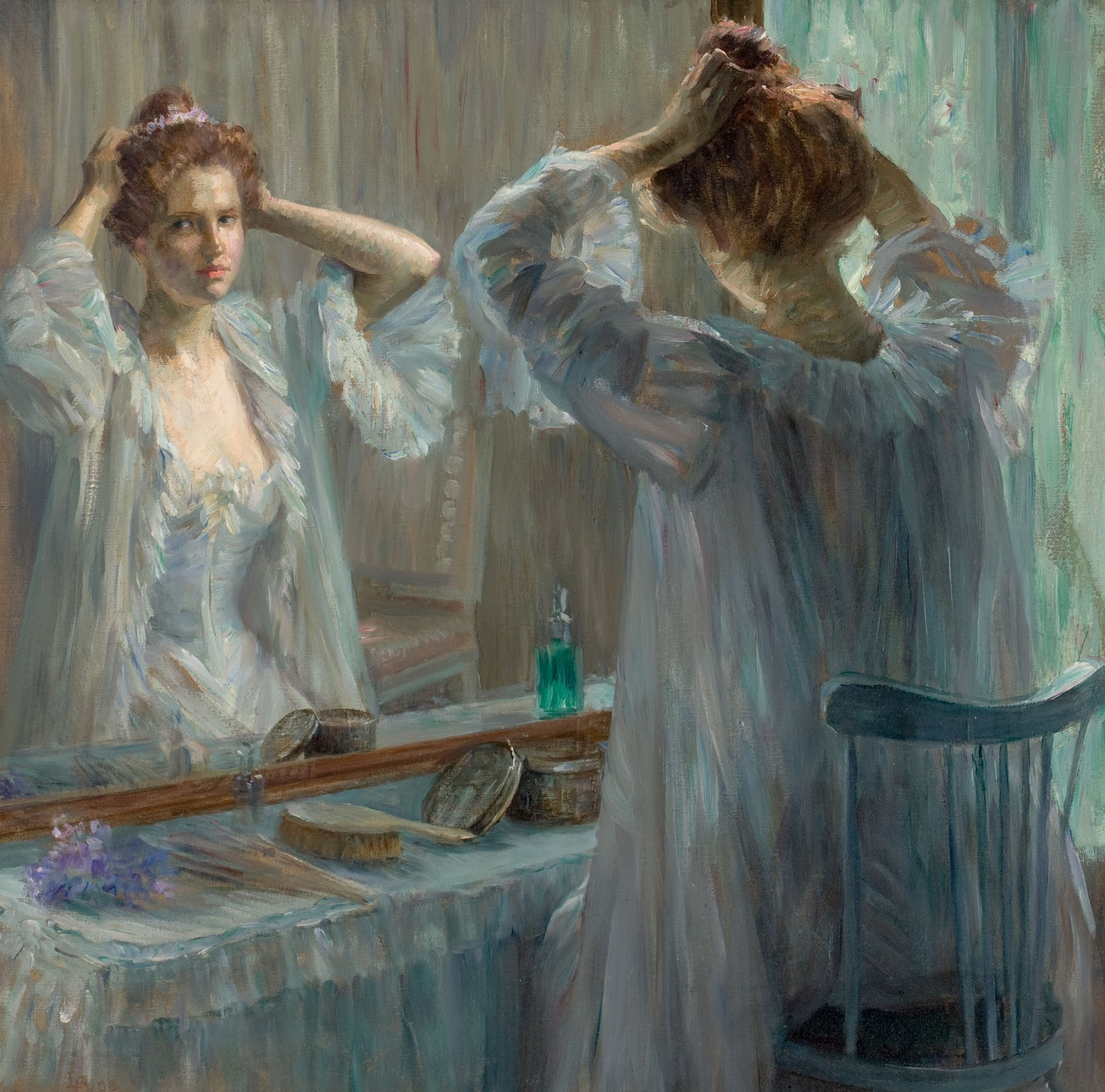
The Toilette (Madeleine Zillhardt)

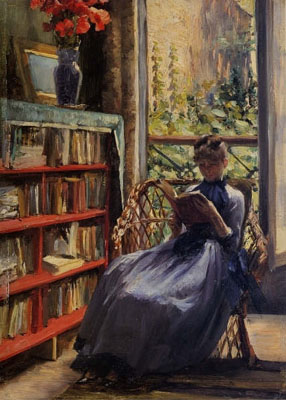
The Reader

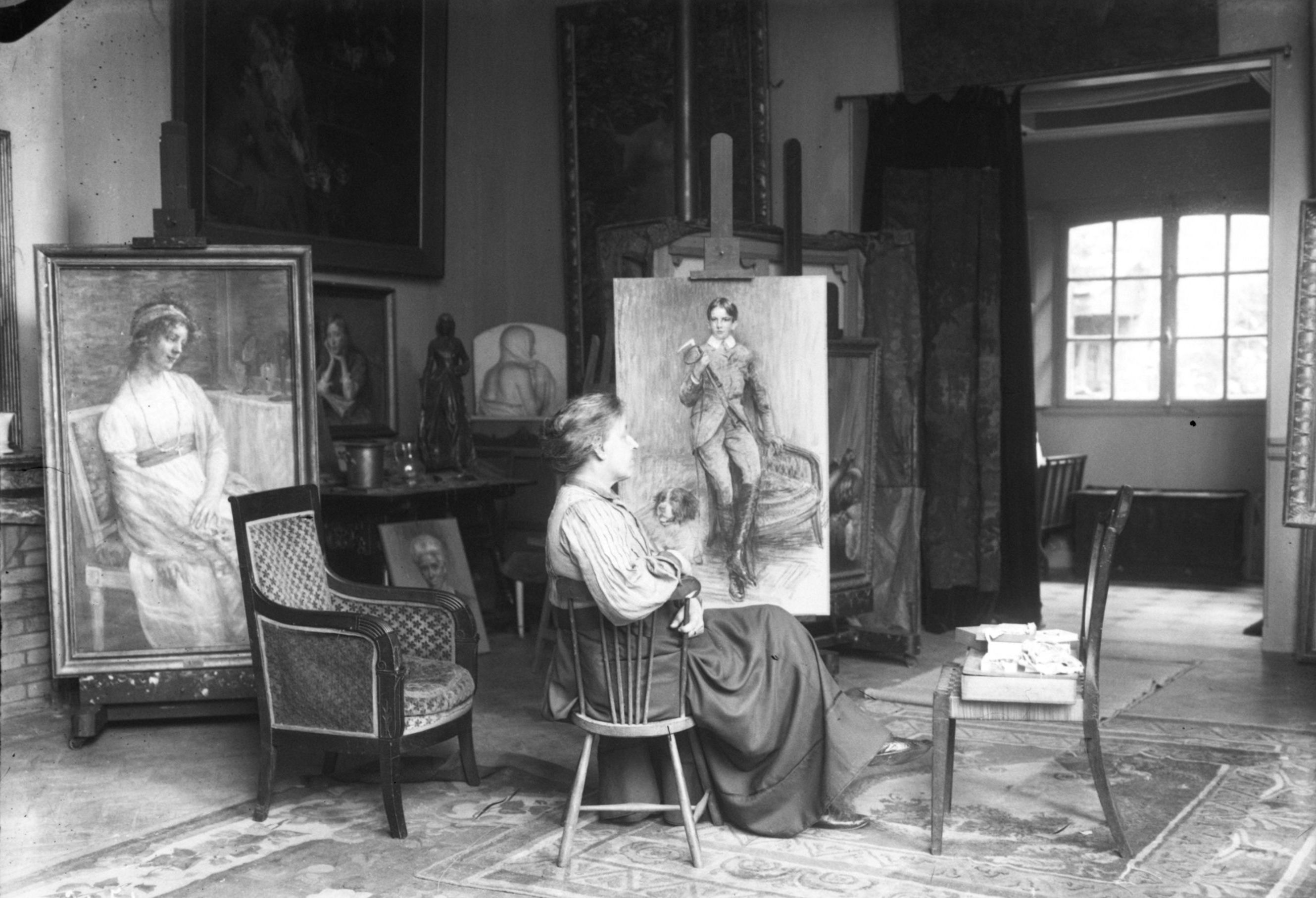
Louise Catherine Breslau in her studio

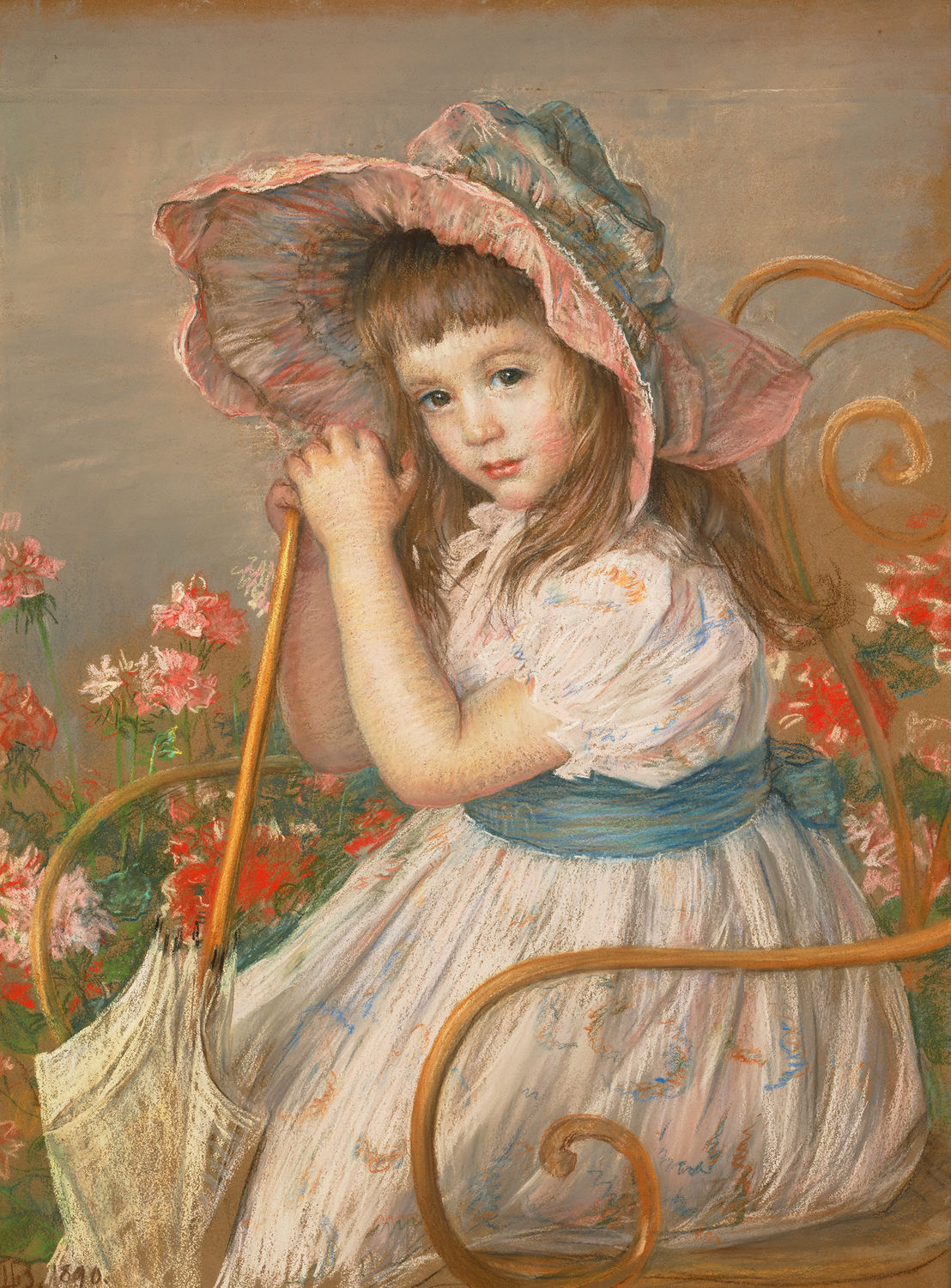
Le chapeau rose, 1890. Pastel on paper. Private collection.

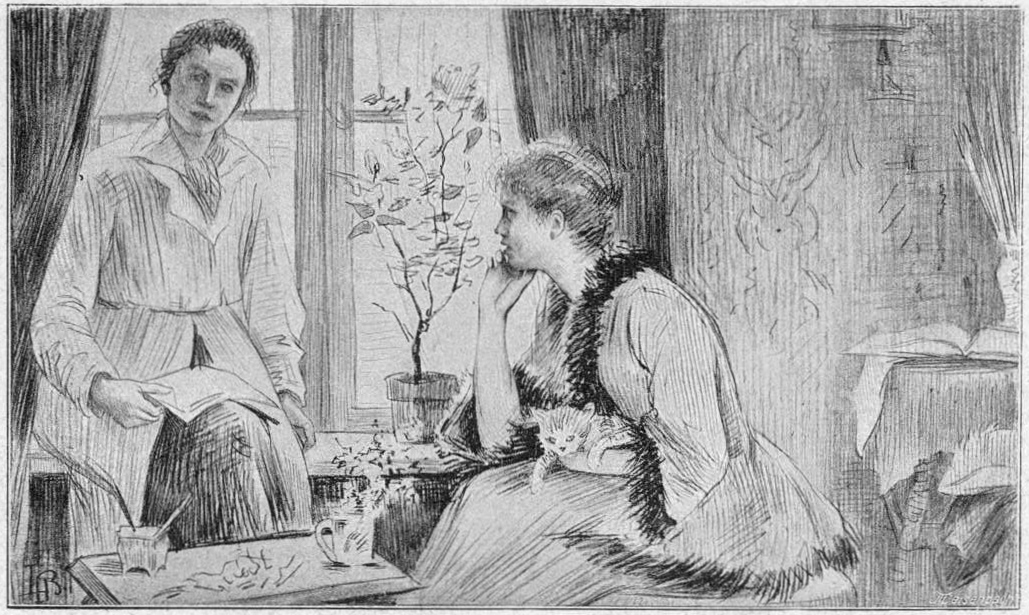
Drawing of 'Contre-jour' with Madeleine Zillhardt by Louise Catherine Breslau

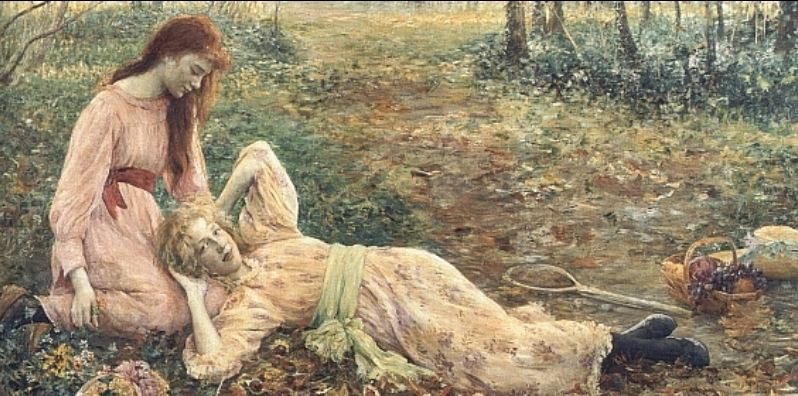
'Gamines' bought by French government in 1890.

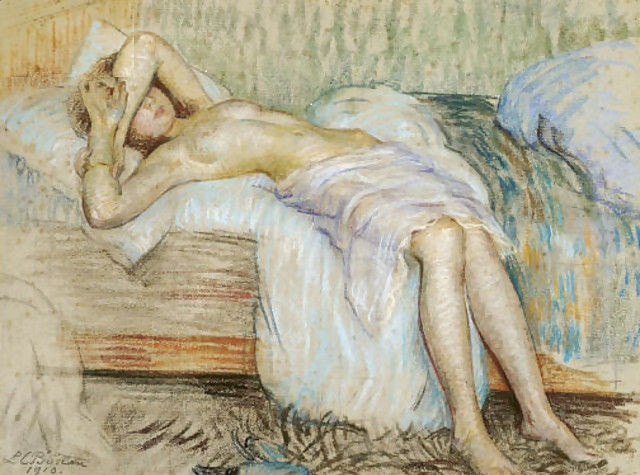
'Paresse matinale' (Lazy morning)

== Collections ==
Breslau's work is held in the following public collections:

=== France ===
- Paris :
  - Musée du Louvre (including especially Portrait de Madeleine Zillhardt)
  - Musée d'Orsay, Paris
  - Petit Palais, Musée des Beaux-Arts de la Ville de Paris
  - Musée Carnavalet
- Musée de Grenoble
- Musée d'art moderne et contemporain, Strasbourg
- Musée des Beaux-Arts, Rouen
- Nice, musée des beaux-arts.
- Saint-Quentin (home town of her partner Madeleine Zillhardt) : the 'Musée Antoine Lécuyer' exhibits Sous la lampe.Portrait de Madeleine Zillhardt
- Troyes, musée des beaux-arts.
- Versailles, château de Versailles.
- Musée des beaux-arts de Dijon
- The 'Musée Comtadin-Duplessis' in Carpentras (Provence) displays the famous masterpiece Gamines (1890).

=== Ireland ===
- National Gallery of Ireland

=== Sweden ===
- Nationalmuseum, Stockholm

=== Switzerland ===
- Bern Kunstmuseum (Museum of fine Art)
- Musée Cantonal des Beaux-Arts de Lausanne
- Musée d'Art et d'Histoire de Genève
- Kunstmuseum (Basel)
- The Museum of Art Lucerne exhibits Crying Woman (1905)

=== United Kingdom ===
- British Museum, London

=== United States ===
- Smithsonian American Art Museum
- Dallas Museum of Art
- Fine Arts Museums of San Francisco
- Clark Art Institute, Williamstown, MA
