= Louise-Catherine =

Coordinates: 48°50′36″N 02°22′01″E

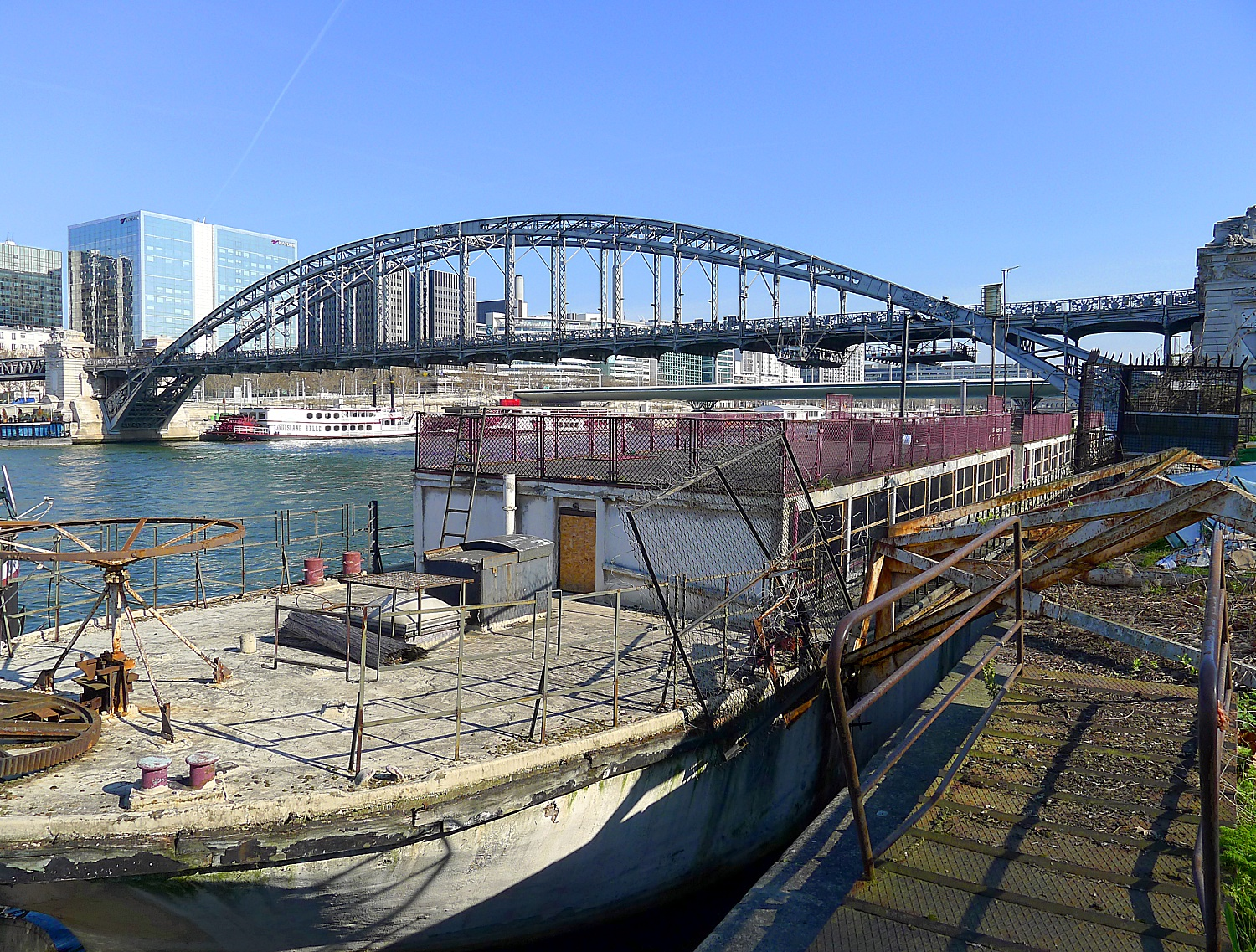
Louise-Catherine under renovation, 2011

Louise-Catherine is a former coal barge that was converted by the architect Le Corbusier into a floating homeless shelter, moored in Paris. It is a registered historic monument of the city of Paris. After being unused for years, it was under renovation as a cultural centre when it sank in the aftermath of the flooding of the Seine in early 2018.

== History ==
Louise-Catherine is a flat-bottomed reinforced concrete barge 70 metres (230 ft) long and 10 metres (33 ft) wide. It was built in 1915 as Liège to bring coal from Rouen to Paris during the First World War.

=== Homeless shelter ===
In 1929, Madeleine Zillhardt bought the barge with the profit from reselling a drawing and donated it to the Salvation Army on condition it be renamed Louise-Catherine after her companion, Louise Catherine Breslau, who had died shortly before. A friend of hers and Breslau's, Winnaretta Singer, had it brought from Rouen and commissioned Le Corbusier to design, with Japanese architect Kunio Maekawa its conversion into a 160-bed homeless shelter. He created three dormitories, dining rooms, toilet facilities including showers, quarters for a boatsman and the shelter director, and a hanging garden on the former bridge. He installed square windows and thin columns and designed the furniture, including cupboards with sliding doors. Le Corbusier wrote that the intention was for the barge to be moored in front of the Louvre Museum in winter as a homeless shelter, and in summer to be used as a floating children's camp, further upstream at the Pont des Arts. Its use was suspended during the Second World War, and in 1950 it was repurposed to house ex-prisoners and discharged hospital patients as well as the homeless.

=== Renovation and sinking ===
The Salvation Army closed the shelter in 1994 after the hull flooded. In 2006 they sold the barge to the Kertekian family and two other benefactors; the Association Louise-Catherine, headed by architect Michel Cantal-Dupart, was formed to renovate it into a museum and cultural centre with financial assistance from the Fondation Le Corbusier and the French state. It was designated a Paris historical monument by the Direction régionale des affaires culturelles in 2008; now moored near the Gare d'Austerlitz, it is the only watercraft in the city to be registered as a monument. During renovation by the architecture firm ACYC, the barge was to be enclosed in a temporary metal structure designed by the Japanese architect Shuhei Endo. There are plans to build two gangplanks for access modelled on those originally installed.

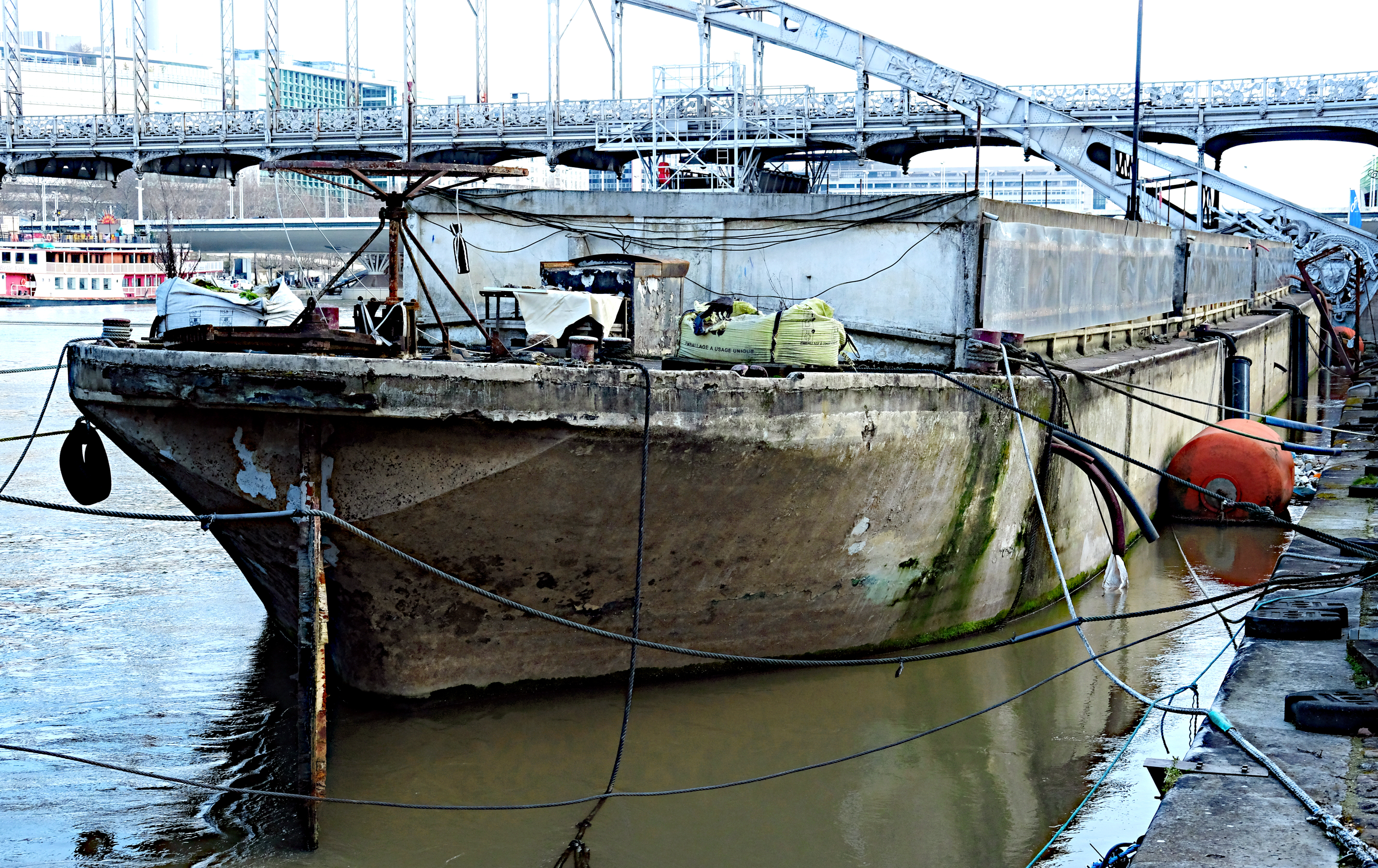
Louise-Catherine in 2024.

When the level of the Seine dropped after the January 2018 flood, Louise-Catherine's bow caught on the lip of the wharf and on 8 February, despite efforts to free it so she could right herself, the barge took on water and sank rapidly. The fire service brought in a pusher to assist and the wave created when she hit the water may have hastened her sinking. Once the water level returns to normal, the Association planned to have her inspected by divers and refloated and, if possible, to complete the renovation in time to open the exhibition space to the public in October 2018, with an exhibit of work by Japanese architects "passionate about this story and the work of Le Corbusier", as a celebration of 160 years of Franco-Japanese friendship. Donations may be sought to help with raising the barge.
