= List of elections in 1997 =

The following elections occurred in the year 1997.

== Africa ==
- 1997 Algerian legislative election
- 1997 Burkinabé parliamentary election
- 1997 Cameroonian parliamentary election
- 1997 Cameroonian presidential election
- 1997 Chadian parliamentary election
- 1997 Djiboutian parliamentary election
- 1997 Gambian parliamentary election
- 1997 Kenyan general election
- 1997 Liberian general election
- April 1997 Malian parliamentary election
- July 1997 Malian parliamentary election
- 1997 Malian presidential election
- 1997 Mauritanian presidential election
- 1997 Moroccan general election
- 1997 Somaliland presidential election

== Asia ==
- 1997 Balochistan provincial assembly election
- 1997 Indonesian legislative election
- 1997 Iranian presidential election
- 1997 Jordanian general election
- 1997 Laotian parliamentary election
- 1997 Mongolian presidential election
- 1997 Omani general election
- 1997 Pakistani general election
- 1997 Pakistani presidential election
- 1997 Philippine barangay election
- 1997 Singaporean general election
- 1997 South Korean presidential election
- 1997 Indian presidential election
- 1997 Indian vice presidential election
- 1997 Vietnamese legislative election
- 1997 Yemeni parliamentary election

== Europe ==
- 1997 Albanian parliamentary election
- 1997 Andorran parliamentary election
- 1997 Bulgarian parliamentary election
- 1997 Croatian presidential election
- 1997 Croatian Chamber of Counties election
- 1997 Croatian local elections
- 1997 Danish local elections
- 1997 Irish general election
- 1997 Irish presidential election
- 1997 Liechtenstein general election
- 1997–1998 Lithuanian presidential election
- 1997 Montenegrin presidential election
- 1997 Norwegian parliamentary election
- 1997 Polish parliamentary election
- 1997 Portuguese local elections
- 1997 San Marino local elections
- 1997 Serbian general election
- 1997 Serbian presidential election
- 1997 Slovenian presidential election
- 1997 Swiss referendums

=== France ===
- 1997 French legislative election

=== Germany ===
- 1997 Hamburg state election

=== Spain ===
- 1997 Galician regional election

=== United Kingdom ===
- 1997 United Kingdom general election
  - England: 1997 United Kingdom general election in England
  - Scotland: 1997 United Kingdom general election in Scotland
  - Wales: 1997 United Kingdom general election in Wales
  - Northern Ireland: 1997 United Kingdom general election in Northern Ireland
  - List of MPs elected in the 1997 United Kingdom general election
- 1997 Beckenham by-election
- Blair Babe
- 1997 Conservative Party leadership election
- Richard Huggett
- 1997 United Kingdom local elections
- 1997 Paisley South by-election
- 1997 Scottish devolution referendum
- 1997 Uxbridge by-election
- 1997 Winchester by-election
- 1997 Wirral South by-election

==== United Kingdom local ====
- 1997 United Kingdom local elections
- 1997 Northern Ireland local elections

===== English local =====
- 1997 Bracknell Forest Borough Council election
- 1997 Bristol City Council election
- 1997 Cornwall County Council election
- 1997 Cumbria County Council election
- 1997 Devon County Council election
- 1997 Dorset County Council election
- 1997 Essex County Council election
- 1997 Hertfordshire County Council election
- 1997 Kent County Council election
- 1997 Lancashire County Council election
- 1997 Lincolnshire County Council election
- 1997 Norfolk County Council election
- 1997 Northumberland County Council election
- 1997 Nottinghamshire County Council election
- 1997 Oxfordshire County Council election
- 1997 Peterborough City Council election
- 1997 Plymouth City Council election
- 1997 Reading Borough Council election
- 1997 Slough Borough Council election
- 1997 Southend-on-Sea Borough Council election
- 1997 Suffolk County Council election
- 1997 Thurrock Council election
- 1997 West Sussex County Council election
- 1997 Wiltshire County Council election

== North America ==
- 1996–97 Belizean municipal elections

=== Canada ===
- 1997 Alberta general election
- 1997 Canadian federal election
- 1997 Progressive Conservative Party of New Brunswick leadership election

==== Ontario municipal ====
- 1997 Ontario municipal elections
- 1997 Brantford municipal election
- 1997 Hamilton, Ontario municipal election
- 1997 Ottawa municipal election
- 1997 Ottawa-Carleton Regional Municipality elections
- 1997 St. Catharines municipal election
- 1997 Sudbury municipal election
- 1997 Toronto municipal election
- 1997 Windsor municipal election

=== Caribbean ===
- 1997 Aruban general election
- 1997 Bahamian general election
- 1997 Haitian parliamentary election
- 1997 Jamaican general election
- 1997 Saint Lucian general election
- 1997 Trinidad and Tobago presidential election

=== Mexico ===
- 1997 Mexican legislative election

=== United States ===
- 1997 United States elections

==== United States House of Representatives ====
- 1997 United States House of Representatives elections
- 1997 New Mexico's 3rd congressional district special election
- 1997 Texas's 28th congressional district special election

==== United States lieutenant gubernatorial ====
- 1997 Virginia lieutenant gubernatorial election

==== United States mayoral ====
- 1997 Albuquerque mayoral election
- 1997 Allentown mayoral election
- 1997 Anchorage mayoral election
- 1997 Arlington mayoral election
- 1997 Atlanta mayoral election
- 1997 Boise mayoral election
- 1997 Boston mayoral election
- 1997 Buffalo mayoral election
- 1997 Burlington, Vermont mayoral election
- 1997 Cleveland mayoral election
- 1997 Colorado Springs mayoral special election
- 1997 Des Moines mayoral special election
- 1997 Detroit mayoral election
- 1997 Durham mayoral election
- 1997 Hartford mayoral election
- 1997 Houston mayoral election
- 1997 Los Angeles mayoral election
- 1997 Madison mayoral special election
- 1997 Manchester, New Hampshire, mayoral election
- 1997 Miami mayoral election
- 1997 New York City mayoral election
- 1997 Omaha mayoral election
- 1997 Overland Park, Kansas, mayoral election
- 1997 Pittsburgh mayoral election
- 1997 Raleigh mayoral election
- 1997 Riverside, California, mayoral election
- 1997 Seattle mayoral election
- 1997 Springfield, Massachusetts mayoral election
- 1997 St. Louis mayoral election
- 1997 Tallahassee mayoral election
- 1997 Toledo, Ohio mayoral election
- 1997 Winston-Salem mayoral election
- 1997 Worcester, Massachusetts mayoral election

==== United States gubernatorial ====
- 1997 New Jersey gubernatorial election
- 1997 United States gubernatorial elections
- 1997 Virginia gubernatorial election

== Oceania ==
- 1997 Micronesian general election
- 1997 Nauruan parliamentary election
- 1997 Papua New Guinean general election
- 1997 Solomon Islands general election

=== Australia ===
- 1997 Fraser by-election
- 1997 Northern Territory general election
- 1997 South Australian state election
- 1997 Sutherland state by-election

== South America ==
- 1997 Argentine legislative election
- 1997 Bolivian presidential election
- 1997 Chilean parliamentary election
- 1997 Ecuadorian Constitutional Assembly election
- 1997 Falkland Islands general election
- 1997 Guyanese legislative election
- 1997 Honduran general election
- 1997 Salvadoran legislative election
