= Miangul Asfandyar Amir Zeb =

Pakistani politician

Prince Miangul Asfandyar Amir Zeb
- Asfandyar Bacha
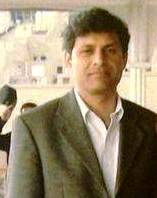

District Nazim, Swat District
- In office 2003–2005
- President: General Pervez Musharraf
- Prime Minister: Mir Zafarullah Khan Jamali
- Preceded by: Dr. Mahboob-ur-Rahman
- Succeeded by: Jamal Nasir

Minister of Education, Khyber Pakhtunkhwa, province of Pakistan
- In office 5 September 1997 – 12 October 1999
- President: Justice Retired Muhammad Rafiq Tarar
- Prime Minister: Nawaz Sharif
- Constituency: PF-81, Swat-2
- Majority: Pakistan Muslim League Nawaz (PML-N)

Personal details
- Born: November 30, 1965 Saidu Sharif, Swat (princely state)
- Died: December 28, 2007 (aged 42) Manglawar, Swat
- Resting place: Aqba, Saidu Sharif, Swat; 34°45'0N 72°21'0E
- Party: Pakistan Muslim League Nawaz(PML-N)
- Relations: Miangul Jahan Zeb (grandfather)
- Parent: Miangul Amirzeb
- Occupation: Politician

Miangul Asfandyar Amir Zeb (Pashto: میانگل اسفندیار امیرزېب) (30 November 1965 – 28 December 2007) was a Pakistani politician and a member of the royal family of the former Princely State of Swat, who was killed in an assassination attack by the Taliban during the 2007 skirmishes in Swat. His assassination was the first high-profile killing by the Taliban militants of Swat, occurring just a day after the killing of Benazir Bhutto.

== Family ==
Amir Zeb was the grandson of the former ruler of the Swat, Miangul Jehanzeb, and the former president of Pakistan, Ayub Khan. He was the son of Miangul Amir Zeb (who was a member of the National Assembly of Pakistan in 1977) and a nephew of Miangul Aurang Zeb, former Governor of Khyber Pakhtunkhwa.

== Early life and education ==
Born on 30 November 1965 in Saidu Sharif, Asfandyar received his early education in the Catholic Public High School of Sangota Swat. He was then sent to the Army Burn Hall College in Abbottabad where he completed his Senior Cambridge. He received a bachelor's degree in Civil Engineering from the College of Engineering, University of Peshawar in 1989.

== Political career ==
Amir Zeb, as a young politician affiliated with the Pakistan Muslim League-Nawaz (PML-N), was elected to the NWFP (Khyber Pakhtunkhwa) Assembly on the PML-N ticket in the 1997 elections and was inducted into the cabinet as education minister on 5 September 1998, a position he held until 12 October 1999. He had also won the election for the District Nazim in 2003 after the death of the previous District Nazim, Mehboobur Rahman. He held the position until 2005. The people of the valley were satisfied with his performance as District Nazim, and many drew analogies between him and his grandfather, the former ruler of Swat, Miangul Jehanzeb, who had developed the valley during his rule that ended in 1969.

== Election campaign and assassination ==
Amir Zeb had decided to contest election on the PF-81 Swat constituency in the 2008 general elections and was campaigning in his constituency when he was killed in a roadside bomb blast targeting his vehicle on December 28, 2007, at Manglawar near Mingora. Six of his supporters were also killed in the attack. His assassination was the first high-profile death during the skirmishes in Swat. His contributions to the welfare and rehabilitation of Swat, in many fields, including education, predate the later role of Malala Yousafzai and other such activists.

== See also ==
- Wali of Swat
- Swat (princely state)
- Violence in Pakistan 2006–09
