= 1997 Toledo, Ohio mayoral election =

- November 4, 1997
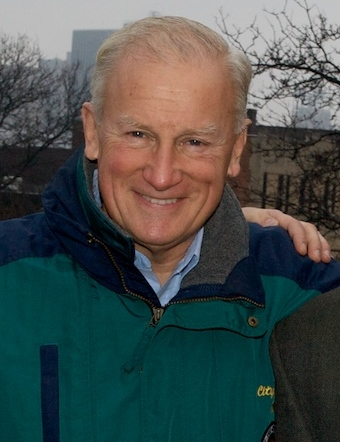

Candidate	Carty Finkbeiner	Nick Wichowski
Party	Nonpartisan	Nonpartisan
Popular vote	46,738	44,973
Percentage	50.96%	49.04%
Mayor before election
Carty Finkbeiner
Nonpartisan
Elected mayor
Carty Finkbeiner
Nonpartisan

The 1997 Toledo, Ohio mayoral election took place on November 4, 1997. Incumbent Mayor Carty Finkbeiner ran for re-election to a second term. He was challenged by four opponents, including Republican businessman Nick Wichowski and neighborhood development specialist Alan Cox. In the primary, Finkbeiner placed first by a wide margin, winning 47 percent of the vote. Wichowski won 27 percent and advanced to the general election against Finkbeiner.

Despite Finkbeiner's popularity and the "robust local economy," the city's financial difficulties ultimately resulted in a close race. Finkbeiner narrowly defeated Wichowski to win re-election, receiving 51 percent of the vote to Wichowski's 49 percent.

== Primary election ==
=== Candidates ===
- Carty Finkbeiner, incumbent Mayor (Democratic)
- Nick Wichowski, businessman (Republican)
- Alan Cox, neighborhood development specialist (independent)
- Dave Domanski, auto worker (Libertarian)
- Edward Emery, sociologist (Republican)

==== Declined ====
- Donna Owens, former Mayor (Republican)
- Sally Perz, State Representative (Republican)
- Gene Zmuda, City Councilman

=== Results ===
Primary election results
Party	Candidate	Votes	%
Nonpartisan	Carty Finkbeiner (inc.)	15,008	47.32%
Nonpartisan	Nick Wichowski	8,526	26.88%
Nonpartisan	Alan Cox	5,374	16.94%
Nonpartisan	Dave Domanski	1,648	5.20%
Nonpartisan	Edward Emery	1,163	3.67%
Total votes		31,719	100.00%

== General election ==
=== Results ===
1997 Toledo mayoral election results
Party	Candidate	Votes	%
Nonpartisan	Carty Finkbeiner (inc.)	46,738	50.96%
Nonpartisan	Nick Wichowski	44,973	49.04%
Write-in		3	0.00%
Total votes		91,714	100.00%
