= 1997 United Kingdom general election in England =

General election held in the United Kingdom

- 1 May 1997

All 529 English seats to the House of Commons
- Turnout: 71.4% (▼6.6 pp)
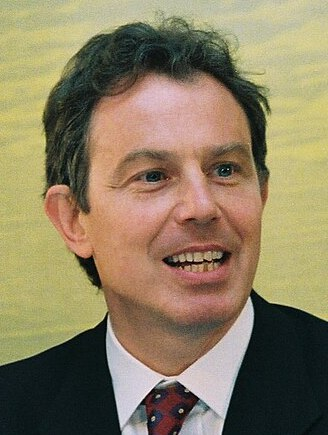

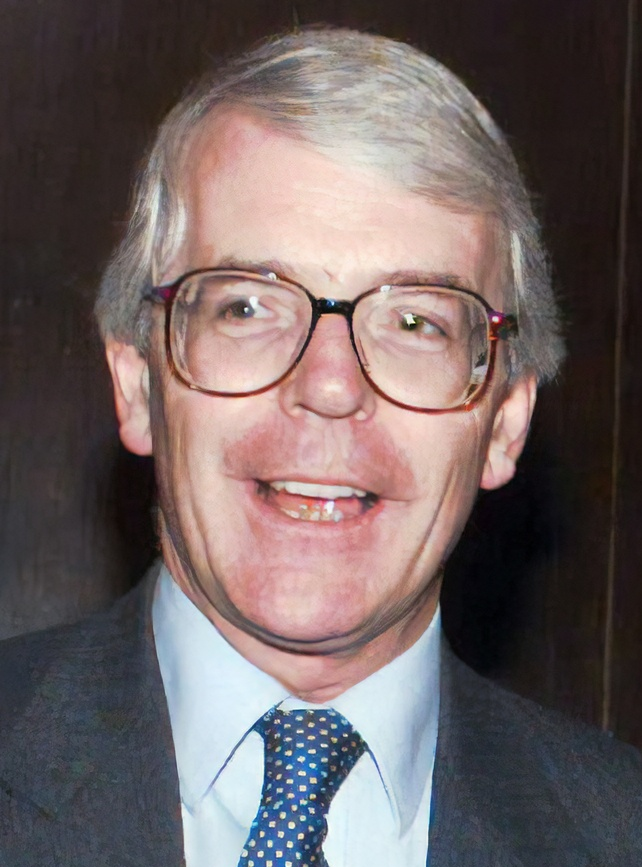

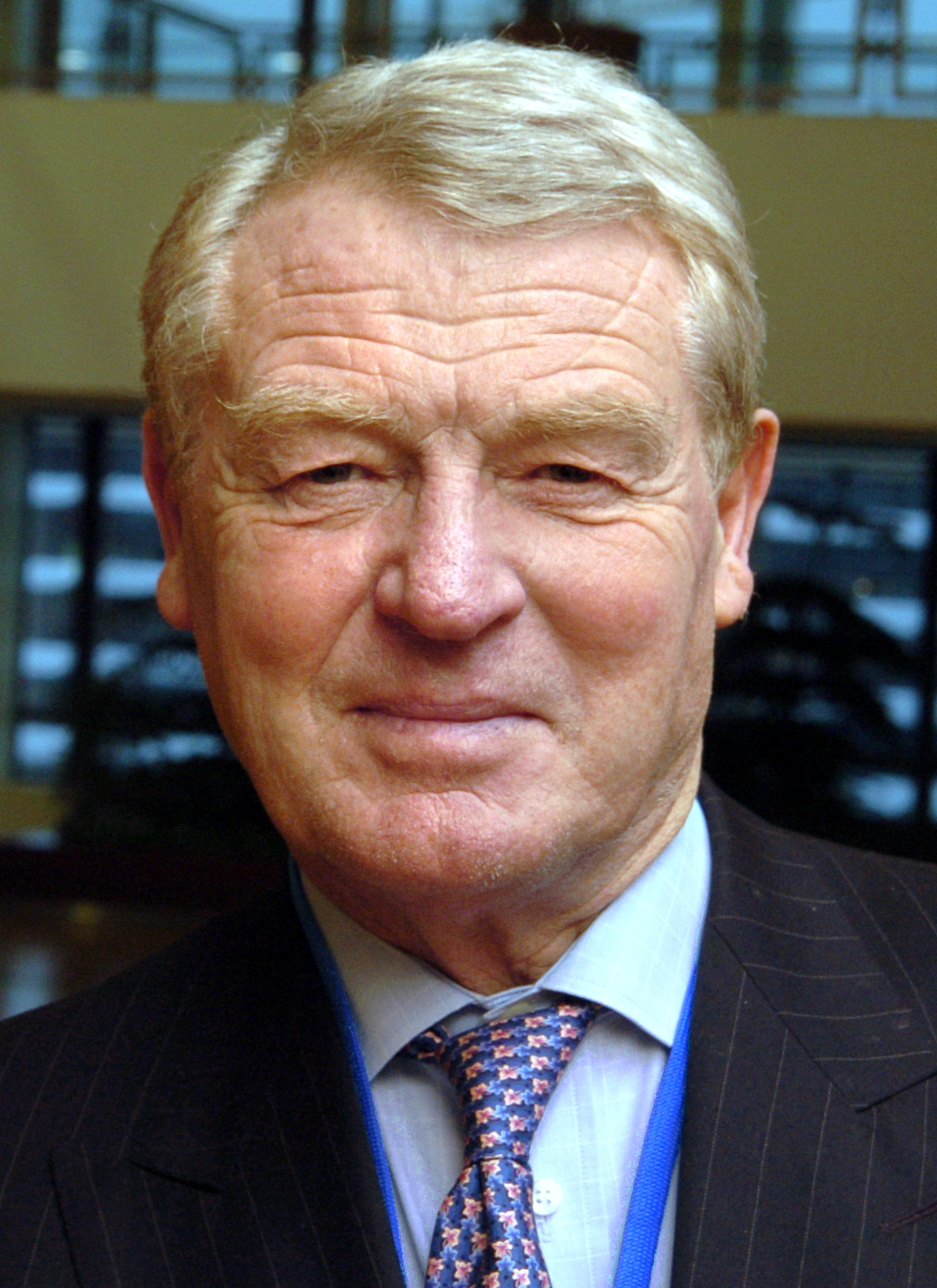
| | First party | Second party | Third party |
|---|---|---|---|
| Leader | Tony Blair | John Major | Paddy Ashdown |
| Party | Labour | Conservative | Liberal Democrats |
| Leader since | 21 July 1994 | 27 November 1990 (Note: Major resigned as Leader of the Conservative Party on 22 June 1995 to face critics in his party and government, and was re-elected as Leader on 4 July 1995) | 16 July 1988 |
| Leader's seat | Sedgefield | Huntingdon | Yeovil |
| Last election | 195 seats, 33.9% | 319 seats, 45.5% | 10 seats, 19.2% |
| Seats before | 196^{†} | 324^{†} | 9^{†} |
| Seats won | 328 | 165 | 34 |
| Seat change | ▲132* | ▼159* | ▲25* |
| Popular vote | 11,347,882 | 8,780,881 | 4,677,565 |
| Percentage | 43.5% | 33.7% | 18.0% |
| Swing | ▲9.6 pp | ▼11.8 pp | ▼1.2 pp |
- ^{†}Notional 1992 results if held on the 1997 boundaries *Indicates boundary change—so this is a notional figure.

On Thursday 1 May 1997, the 1997 United Kingdom general election was held in England, to elect all 659 members of the House of Commons, with 529 constituencies being in England. Under Tony Blair, the Labour Party won a landslide majority of English seats, the first time since 1966 that Labour had won an overall majority of English seats. The England result, together with even larger landslide Labour results in Scotland and Wales, gave Labour the biggest majority for any single party since 1931. Blair subsequently formed the first Labour government since 1979, beginning 13 years of Labour government.

== Candidates ==
Below is a table summarising the candidates of the 1997 general election in England, showing parties that stood 10 or more candidates each.

| Affiliation | Candidates |
|---|---|
| Conservative and Unionist Party | 528 |
| Labour Party | 527 |
| Liberal Democrats | 527 |
| Referendum Party | 445 |
| UK Independence Party | 182 |
| Natural Law Party | 160 |
| Independent | 135 |
| Green Party of England and Wales | 85 |
| Socialist Labour Party | 56 |
| British National Party | 54 |
| Liberal Party | 53 |
| ProLife Alliance | 46 |
| Rainbow Dream Ticket | 31 |
| Official Monster Raving Loony Party | 23 |
| National Democrats | 20 |
| Socialist Party | 15 |
| Independent Conservative | 12 |
| Independent Labour | 11 |
| Others | 35 |
| Total | 2,945 |

== Results ==
| Party | Seats | | | | | Aggregate votes | | |
| Party | Total | Gains | Losses | Net | Of all (%) | Total | Of all (%) | Change (%) |
|---|---|---|---|---|---|---|---|---|
| Labour | 328 | 133 | 1 | ▲132 | 62.0 | 11,347,882 | 43.5 | ▲9.6 |
| Conservative | 165 | 0 | 159 | ▼159 | 31.2 | 8,780,881 | 33.7 | ▼11.8 |
| Liberal Democrats | 34 | 26 | 1 | ▲25 | 6.4 | 4,677,565 | 18.0 | ▼1.3 |
| Referendum | 0 | New | | | — | 746,624 | 2.9 | New |
| UKIP | 0 | New | | | — | 103,521 | 0.4 | New |
| Independent | 1 | 1 (Note: Martin Bell in Tatton.) | 0 | ▲1 | 0.2 | 69,464 | 0.3 | ▲0.2 |
| Green | 0 | 0 | 0 | Steady | — | 60,013 | 0.2 | ▼0.4 |
| Liberal | 0 | 0 | 0 | Steady | — | 44,516 | 0.2 | Steady |
| Socialist Labour | 0 | New | | | — | 44,114 | 0.2 | New |
| BNP | 0 | 0 | 0 | Steady | — | 35,181 | 0.1 | ▲0.1 |
| Natural Law | 0 | 0 | 0 | Steady | — | 25,958 | 0.1 | ▼0.1 |
| Independent Labour | 0 | 0 | 0 | Steady | — | 24,447 | 0.1 | Steady |
| Speaker | 1 | 1 | 0 | ▲1 | 0.2 | 23,969 | 0.1 | Steady |
| Ind. Conservative | 0 | 0 | 0 | Steady | — | 18,667 | 0.1 | Steady |
| ProLife Alliance | 0 | New | | | — | 13,890 | 0.1 | New |
| National Democrats | 0 | New | | | — | 10,748 | 0.0 | New |
| Socialist | 0 | New | | | — | 9,005 | 0.0 | New |
| Monster Raving Loony | 0 | 0 | 0 | Steady | — | 7,553 | 0.0 | Steady |
| Rainbow Dream Ticket | 0 | 0 | 0 | Steady | — | 4,104 | 0.0 | Steady |
| National Front | 0 | 0 | 0 | Steady | — | 2,716 | 0.0 | Steady |
| Mebyon Kernow | 0 | Did not stand in 1992 | | | — | 1,906 | 0.0 | —N/a |
| Legalise Cannabis | 0 | New | | | — | 1,665 | 0.0 | New |
| Workers Revolutionary | 0 | 0 | 0 | Steady | — | 1,098 | 0.0 | Steady |
| Socialist (GB) | 0 | 0 | 0 | Steady | — | 1,044 | 0.0 | Steady |
| Christian Democrat | 0 | 0 | 0 | Steady | — | 694 | 0.0 | Steady |
| Independent Green | 0 | New | | | — | 593 | 0.0 | New |
| Communist | 0 | New | | | — | 338 | 0.0 | New |
| Humanist | 0 | Did not stand in 1992 | | | — | 288 | 0.0 | —N/a |
| Socialist Equality | 0 | New | | | — | 268 | 0.0 | New |
| Total | 529 | | | 0 | 100.0 | 26,058,712 | 100.0 | 0.0 |
| Registered voters, and turnout | | | | | | | 71.4 | ▼6.6 |

Popular vote
| Labour | 43.5% |
| Conservative | 33.7% |
| Liberal Democrats | 18.0% |
| Referendum | 2.9% |
| UKIP | 0.4% |
| Independent | 0.3% |
| Green | 0.2% |
| NLP | 0.1% |
| Other | 0.9% |

Parliament seats
| Labour | 62.0% |
| Conservative | 31.2% |
| Liberal Democrats | 6.4% |
| Other | 0.4% |

== By region ==
Regional vote shares and changes are sourced from the House of Commons Library. The results are based on the regions of England established in 1994; however, the results in Merseyside were recorded separately from North West England, despite being part of the region.

The number of seats for each region that were changed under the fourth periodic review of Westminster constituencies are indicated respectively.

=== North East England ===
| Party | Seats | | | | | Aggregate Votes | | |
| Party | Total | Gains | Losses | Net | Of all (%) | Total | Of all (%) | Change (%) |
|---|---|---|---|---|---|---|---|---|
| Labour | 28 | 3 | 0 | ▲3 | 93.3 | 862,262 | 64.0 | ▲10.7 |
| Conservative | 1 | 0 | 3 | ▼3 | 3.3 | 266,294 | 19.8 | ▼11.0 |
| Liberal Democrats | 1 | 0 | 0 | Steady | 3.3 | 169,270 | 12.6 | ▼2.9 |
| Others | 0 | 0 | 0 | Steady | 0.0 | 48,764 | 3.6 | ▲3.2 |
| Total | 30 | | | Steady | | 1,346,590 | | |

=== North West England ===
| Party | Seats | | | | | Aggregate Votes | | |
| Party | Total | Gains | Losses | Net | Of all (%) | Total | Of all (%) | Change (%) |
|---|---|---|---|---|---|---|---|---|
| Labour | 49 | 13 | 0 | ▲13 | 81.7 | 1,499,518 | 51.5 | ▲9.0 |
| Conservative | 9 | 0 | 14 | ▼14 | 15.0 | 859,436 | 29.5 | ▼11.3 |
| Liberal Democrats | 1 | 0 | 0 | Steady | 1.7 | 421,025 | 14.5 | ▼1.0 |
| Others | 1 | 1 | 0 | ▲1 | 1.7 | 130,730 | 4.5 | ▲3.3 |
| Total | 60 | | | ▲4 | | 2,910,709 | | |

=== Merseyside ===
| Party | Seats | | | | | Aggregate Votes | | |
| Party | Total | Gains | Losses | Net | Of all (%) | Total | Of all (%) | Change (%) |
|---|---|---|---|---|---|---|---|---|
| Labour | 15 | 3 | 0 | ▲3 | 93.8 | 442,366 | 64.0 | ▲10.4 |
| Conservative | 0 | 0 | 4 | ▼4 | 0.0 | 141,120 | 19.8 | ▼9.3 |
| Liberal Democrats | 1 | 1 | 0 | ▲1 | 6.2 | 103,152 | 12.6 | ▼2.4 |
| Others | 0 | 0 | 0 | Steady | 0.0 | 28,158 | 3.6 | ▲1.3 |
| Total | 16 | | | ▼1 | | 714,796 | | |

=== Yorkshire and the Humber ===
| Party | Seats | | | | | Aggregate Votes | | |
| Party | Total | Gains | Losses | Net | Of all (%) | Total | Of all (%) | Change (%) |
|---|---|---|---|---|---|---|---|---|
| Labour | 47 | 13 | 0 | ▲13 | 83.9 | 1,339,170 | 51.9 | ▲7.6 |
| Conservative | 7 | 0 | 15 | ▼15 | 12.5 | 720,771 | 28.0 | ▼10.0 |
| Liberal Democrats | 2 | 2 | 0 | ▲2 | 3.6 | 412,216 | 16.0 | ▼0.8 |
| Others | 0 | 0 | 0 | Steady | 0.0 | 106,016 | 4.1 | ▲3.2 |
| Total | 56 | | | ▲2 | | 2,578,173 | | |

=== East Midlands ===
| Party | Seats | | | | | Aggregate Votes | | |
| Party | Total | Gains | Losses | Net | Of all (%) | Total | Of all (%) | Change (%) |
|---|---|---|---|---|---|---|---|---|
| Labour | 30 | 15 | 0 | ▲15 | 68.2 | 1,097,639 | 47.8 | ▲10.4 |
| Conservative | 14 | 0 | 14 | ▼15 | 31.8 | 800,958 | 34.9 | ▼11.7 |
| Liberal Democrats | 0 | 0 | 0 | Steady | 0.0 | 311,264 | 13.6 | ▼1.7 |
| Others | 0 | 0 | 0 | Steady | 0.0 | 84,889 | 3.7 | ▲3.0 |
| Total | 44 | | | ▲2 | | 2,294,750 | | |

=== West Midlands ===
| Party | Seats | | | | | Aggregate Votes | | |
| Party | Total | Gains | Losses | Net | Of all (%) | Total | Of all (%) | Change (%) |
|---|---|---|---|---|---|---|---|---|
| Labour | 43 | 15 | 0 | ▲15 | 72.9 | 1,326,822 | 47.0 | ▲8.2 |
| Conservative | 14 | 0 | 17 | ▼17 | 23.7 | 953,465 | 33.7 | ▼11.0 |
| Liberal Democrats | 1 | 1 | 0 | ▲1 | 1.7 | 388,807 | 13.8 | ▼1.3 |
| Others | 1 | 1 | 0 | ▲1 | 1.7 | 156,731 | 5.5 | ▲4.1 |
| Total | 59 | | | ▲1 | | 2,825,825 | | |

=== East of England ===
| Party | Seats | | | | | Aggregate Votes | | |
| Party | Total | Gains | Losses | Net | Of all (%) | Total | Of all (%) | Change (%) |
|---|---|---|---|---|---|---|---|---|
| Conservative | 33 | 0 | 19 | ▼19 | 58.9 | 1,164,777 | 39.5 | ▼13.0 |
| Labour | 22 | 18 | 0 | ▲18 | 39.3 | 1,137,637 | 38.6 | ▲12.2 |
| Liberal Democrats | 1 | 1 | 0 | ▲1 | 1.8 | 504,416 | 17.1 | ▼2.7 |
| Others | 0 | 0 | 0 | Steady | 0.0 | 140,337 | 4.8 | ▲3.5 |
| Total | 56 | | | ▲5 | | 2,947,167 | | |

=== Greater London ===
| Party | Seats | | | | | Aggregate Votes | | |
| Party | Total | Gains | Losses | Net | Of all (%) | Total | Of all (%) | Change (%) |
|---|---|---|---|---|---|---|---|---|
| Labour | 57 | 25 | 0 | ▲25 | 77.0 | 1,643,329 | 49.5 | ▲12.4 |
| Conservative | 11 | 0 | 30 | ▼30 | 14.9 | 1,036,082 | 31.2 | ▼14.1 |
| Liberal Democrats | 6 | 5 | 0 | ▲5 | 8.1 | 485,511 | 14.6 | ▼1.3 |
| Others | 0 | 0 | 0 | Steady | 0.0 | 156,126 | 4.7 | ▲3.0 |
| Total | 74 | | | ▼10 | | 3,321,048 | | |

Greater London

=== South East England ===
| Party | Seats | | | | | Aggregate Votes | | |
| Party | Total | Gains | Losses | Net | Of all (%) | Total | Of all (%) | Change (%) |
|---|---|---|---|---|---|---|---|---|
| Conservative | 54 | 0 | 25 | ▼25 | 65.1 | 1,817,343 | 41.9 | ▼13.1 |
| Labour | 22 | 18 | 0 | ▲18 | 26.5 | 1,264,778 | 29.1 | ▲10.2 |
| Liberal Democrats | 7 | 7 | 0 | ▲7 | 8.4 | 1,012,418 | 23.3 | ▼1.4 |
| Others | 0 | 0 | 0 | Steady | 0.0 | 247,069 | 5.7 | ▲4.2 |
| Total | 83 | | | ▲5 | | 4,341,608 | | |

=== South West England ===
| Party | Seats | | | | | Aggregate Votes | | |
| Party | Total | Gains | Losses | Net | Of all (%) | Total | Of all (%) | Change (%) |
|---|---|---|---|---|---|---|---|---|
| Conservative | 22 | 0 | 17 | ▼17 | 43.1 | 1,020,635 | 36.7 | ▼10.8 |
| Liberal Democrats | 14 | 8 | 0 | ▲8 | 27.5 | 869,486 | 31.3 | ▼0.1 |
| Labour | 15 | 9 | 0 | ▲9 | 29.4 | 734,361 | 26.4 | ▲7.2 |
| Others | 0 | 0 | 0 | Steady | 0.0 | 153,564 | 5.5 | ▲3.7 |
| Total | 51 | | | ▲3 | | 2,778,046 | | |

== See also ==
- 1997 United Kingdom general election in Northern Ireland
- 1997 United Kingdom general election in Scotland
- 1997 United Kingdom general election in Wales
