= 1997 United Kingdom general election in Scotland =

- 1 May 1997

All 72 Scottish seats to the House of Commons
- Turnout: 71.3% (▼4.2%)
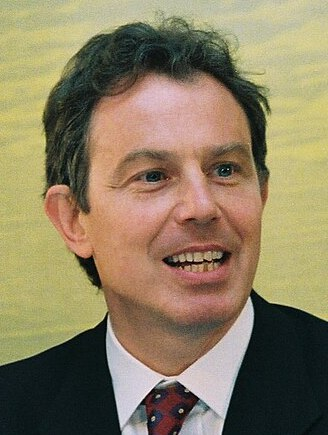

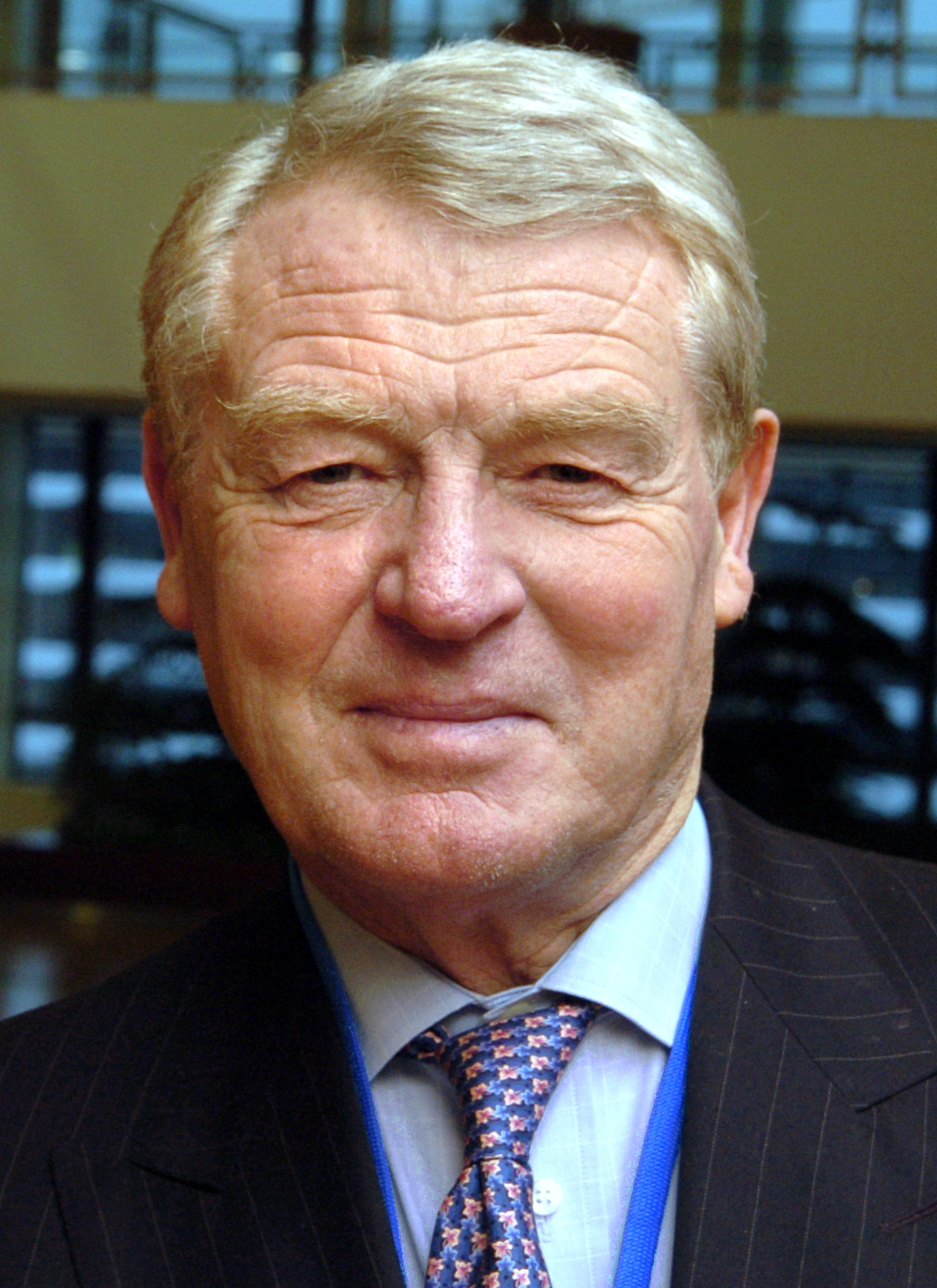

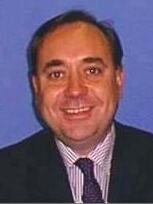

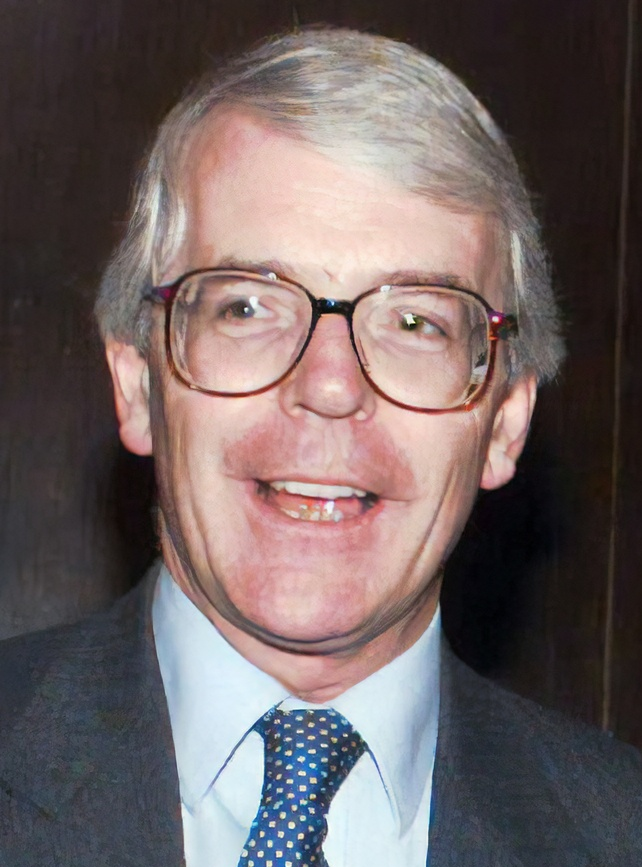
	First party	Second party
Leader	Tony Blair	Paddy Ashdown
Party	Labour	Liberal Democrats
Leader since	21 July 1994	16 July 1988
Leader's seat	Sedgefield	Yeovil
Last election	49 seats, 39.0%	9 seats, 13.1%
Seats before	49†	9†
Seats won	56	10
Seat change	▲7*	▲1*
Popular vote	1,283,350	365,362
Percentage	45.6%	13.0%
Swing	▲6.6 pp	▼0.1 pp
	Third party	Fourth party
Leader	Alex Salmond	John Major
Party	SNP	Conservative
Leader since	22 September 1990	27 November 1990 (Note: Major resigned as Leader of the Conservative Party on 22 June 1995 to face critics in his party and government, and was re-elected as Leader on 4 July 1995)
Leader's seat	Banff and Buchan	Huntingdon
Last election	3 seats, 21.5%	11 seats, 25.6%
Seats before	3†	11†
Seats won	6	0
Seat change	▲3*	▼11*
Popular vote	621,550	493,059
Percentage	22.1%	17.5%
Swing	▲0.6 pp	▼8.2 pp
- Coloured according to the winning party's vote share in each constituency
- ^{†}Notional 1992 results if held on the 1997 boundaries *Indicates boundary change - so this is a notional figure.

On Thursday 1 May 1997, the 1997 United Kingdom general election was held in Scotland, to elect all 659 members of the House of Commons, with 72 constituencies being in Scotland. This would be the last UK general election to be contested in Scotland before the Scottish Parliament was established on 1 July 1999 following overwhelming public approval in a referendum.

The eleventh consecutive victory for Scottish Labour, this election gained notoriety for the fact that the Conservatives, led by then Prime Minister John Major, lost every single Scottish seat they had previously held, leaving no Conservative MPs from Scotland for the first time in British history.

== Candidates ==
Below is a table summarising the candidates of the 1997 general election in Scotland.

Affiliation	Candidates
Labour Party	72
Conservative and Unionist Party	72
Liberal Democrats	72
Scottish National Party	72
Referendum Party	67
Scottish Socialist Alliance	16
Natural Law Party	14
UK Independence Party	9
Prolife Alliance	9
Independent	8
Scottish Green Party	5
Socialist Labour Party	3
Independent Labour	3
British National Party	3
Liberal Party	2
Socialist Party of Great Britain	2
Independent Conservative	1 (Note: Candidate Zahid Abbasi stood in Glasgow Govan.)
Workers Revolutionary Party	1 (Note: Candidate John Graham stood in Glasgow Shettleston.)
Total	431

== Top target seats of the main parties ==
=== Labour targets ===
Rank	Constituency	Winning party 1992	Swing to gain	Labour's place 1992	Result
1	Ayr	Conservative	0.1	2nd	Lab Gain
2	Inverness, Nairn and Lochaber	Liberal Democrats	0.45	2nd	Lab Gain
3	Stirling	Conservative	0.75	2nd	Lab Gain
4	Aberdeen South	Conservative	1.85	2nd	Lab Gain
5	Edinburgh Pentlands	Conservative	4.8	2nd	Lab Gain

=== SNP targets ===
Rank	Constituencee	Winning party 1992	Swing to gain	SNP's place 1992	Result
1	Inverness, Nairn and Lochaber	Liberal Democrats	0.65	3rd	Lab Gain
2	Perth	Conservative	2.1	2nd	SNP Gain
3	Galloway and Upper Nithsdale	Conservative	2.75	2nd	SNP Gain
4	North Tayside	Conservative	4.6	2nd	SNP Gain

=== Conservative targets ===
Rank	Constituency	Winning party 1992	Swing to gain	Con place 1992	Result
1	Gordon	Liberal Democrats	0.2	2nd	LD hold
2	Angus East	SNP	1	2nd	SNP hold
3	Inverness, Nairn and Lochaber	Liberal Democrats	1.7	4th	Lab Gain
4	West Renfrewshire	Labour	1.85	2nd	Lab hold
5	Edinburgh Central	Labour	2.7	2nd	Lab hold
6	Moray	SNP	3.1	2nd	SNP hold
7	Strathkelvin and Bearsden	Labour	3.1	2nd	Lab hold
8	Cunninghame North	Labour	3.45	2nd	Lab hold
9	Argyll and Bute	Liberal Democrats	3.6	2nd	LD hold
10	North East Fife	Liberal Democrats	3.95	2nd	LD hold
11	Tweeddale, Ettrick and Lauderdale	Liberal Democrats	4.1	2nd	LD hold
12	Banff and Buchan	SNP	4.45	2nd	SNP hold
13	Edinburgh South	Labour	4.7	2nd	Lab hold

=== Liberal Democrat targets ===
Rank	Constituency	Winning party 1992	Swing to gain	LD's place 1992	Result
1	Edinburgh West	Conservative	0.6	2nd	LD Gain
2	West Aberdeenshire and Kincardine	Conservative	4.3	2nd	LD Gain

== Outcome ==
The election saw the Conservatives lose every seat that they held in Scotland, although the party were third in terms of vote share (winning 17.5% of votes cast in Scotland). By contrast the Liberal Democrats won 13% of votes cast, but won ten seats, a net gain of one on the previous election. The SNP finished second in terms of vote share with 22%, but only won six seats. Labour won 45.6% of the vote and 56 seats, a net gain of seven on 1992. The defeated Conservative included three cabinet ministers: the Secretary of State for Scotland, Michael Forsyth lost Stirling to Labour, the Foreign Secretary Malcolm Rifkind lost Edinburgh Pentlands, also to Labour, while Ian Lang, President of the Board of Trade, lost Galloway and Upper Nithsdale to the SNP.

== Results ==
Below is a table summarising the results of the 1997 general election in Scotland.

Party	Seats					Aggregate votes		
Party	Total	Gains	Losses	Net	Of all (%)	Total	Of all (%)	Change (%)
Labour	56	7	0	▲7	77.8	1,283,350	45.6	▲6.6
SNP	6	3	0	▲3	8.3	621,550	22.1	▲0.6
Conservative	0	0	11	▼11	—	493,059	17.5	▼8.2
Liberal Democrats	10	1	0	▲1	13.9	365,362	13.0	▼0.1
Referendum	0	New			—	26,980	1.0	New
Scottish Socialist	0	New			—	9,740	0.3	New
ProLife Alliance	0	New			—	5,172	0.2	New
Natural Law	0	0	0	Steady	—	1,922	0.1	Steady
Socialist Labour	0	New			—	1,792	0.1	New
Green	0	0	0	Steady	—	1,721	0.1	▼0.2
UKIP	0	New			—	1,585	0.1	New
Independent Labour	0	0	0	Steady	—	1,456	0.0	Steady
Independent	0	0	0	Steady	—	1,142	0.0	Steady
BNP	0	0	0	Steady	—	651	0.0	Steady
Liberal	0	0	0	Steady	—	650	0.0	Steady
Socialist (GB)	0	Did not stand in 1992			—	315	0.01	—N/a
Ind. Conservative	0	Did not stand in 1992			—	221	0.0	—N/a
Workers Revolutionary	0	Did not stand in 1992			—	80	0.0	—N/a
Total	72			0	100.0	2,816,748	100.0	0.0
Registered voters, and turnout							71.3	▼4.2

1997 map of Scottish Constituencies - Results

Popular vote
Labour	45.6%
SNP	22.1%
Conservative	17.5%
Liberal Democrats	13.0%
Referendum	1.0%
Other	0.9%

Parliament seats
Labour	77.8%
Liberal Democrats	13.9%
SNP	8.3%

== See also ==
- 1997 United Kingdom general election in England
- 1997 United Kingdom general election in Northern Ireland
- 1997 United Kingdom general election in Wales
- List of MPs for constituencies in Scotland (1997–2001)
