= 1997 United Kingdom general election =

- 1 May 1997

All 659 seats to the House of Commons 330 (Note: The 2 Sinn Féin MPs did not take their seats, so the effective number of seats in the House of Commons was 657, making a majority 329 seats.) seats needed for a majority
- Opinion polls
- Registered: 43,846,152
- Turnout: 31,286,284; 71.3% (▼6.4 pp)
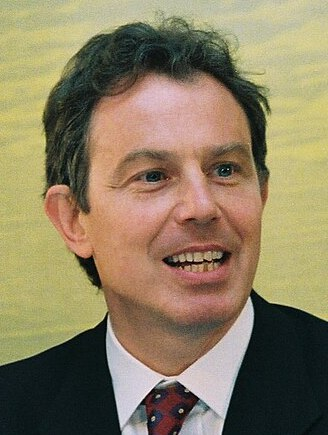

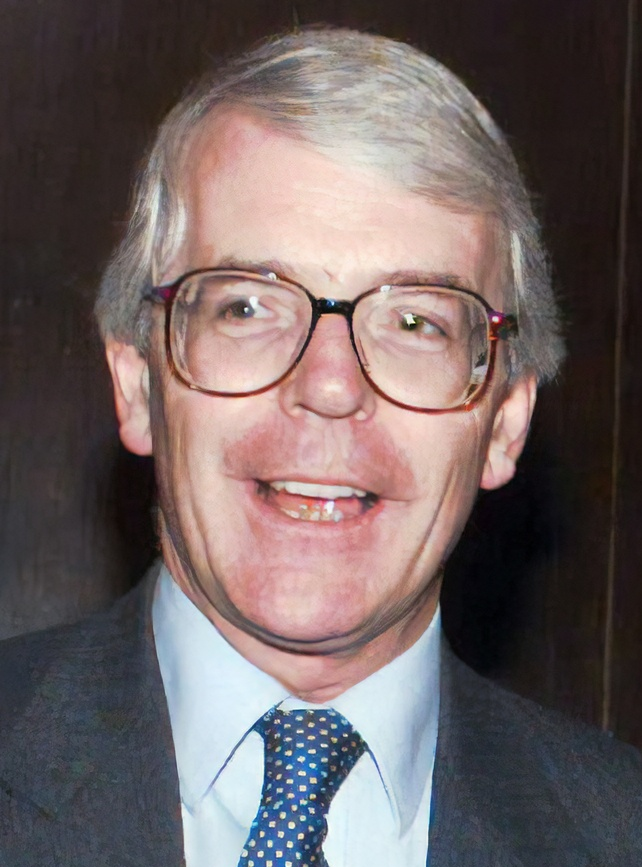

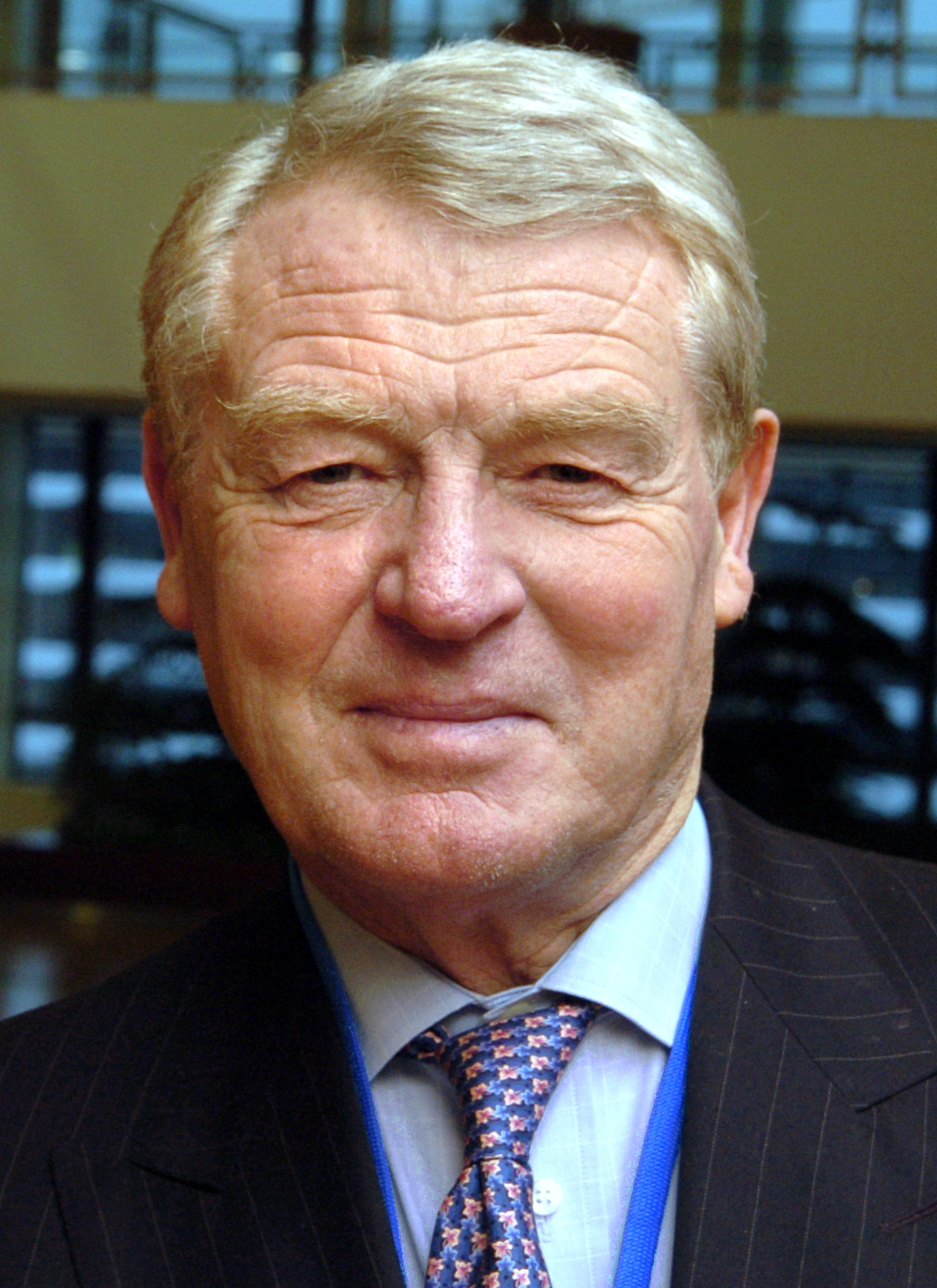
	First party	Second party	Third party
Leader	Tony Blair	John Major	Paddy Ashdown
Party	Labour	Conservative	Liberal Democrats
Leader since	21 July 1994	27 November 1990 (Note: Major resigned as Leader of the Conservative Party on 22 June 1995 to face critics in his party and government, and was re-elected as Leader on 4 July 1995)	16 July 1988
Leader's seat	Sedgefield	Huntingdon	Yeovil
Last election	271 seats, 34.4%	336 seats, 41.9%	20 seats, 17.8%
Seats before	273^{†}	343^{†}	18^{†}
Seats won	418 (Note: Does not include the Speaker, Betty Boothroyd, who was included in the Labour totals by some media outlets)	165	46
Seat change	▲146*	▼178*	▲28*
Popular vote	13,518,167	9,600,943	5,242,947
Percentage	43.2%	30.6%	16.8%
Swing	▲8.9 pp	▼11.3 pp	▼1.0 pp
- Colours denote the winning party, as shown in the main table of results. * Indicates boundary change, so this is a nominal figure.^{†} Notional 1992 results on new boundaries.

- Composition of the House of Commons after the election
Prime Minister before election
John Major
Conservative
Prime Minister after election
Tony Blair
Labour

A general election was held in the United Kingdom on Thursday, 1 May 1997. The governing Conservative Party led by Prime Minister John Major was defeated in a landslide by the opposition Labour Party led by Tony Blair, which achieved a 177-seat majority and a total of 418 seats.

This was the first victory for the Labour party in a general election in nearly 23 years, its previous one registering a majority of three seats in October 1974 under the leadership of Harold Wilson. It was also Labour's first comprehensive victory over the Conservatives since the 1966 election, which had produced a 98-seat majority. This election also marked Labour's highest vote share since the 1970 election and its second highest total number of votes in history (the largest being the 1951 election). On the other hand, it was an ignominious end to the 18-year government of the Conservatives, the longest continuous period of government of any party in modern British history. This election marked the third-largest defeat ever suffered by the Conservatives (exceeded only by the 1906 and 2024 elections) with the party left with just 165 seats—it was left devoid of any MPs outside England, with only 17 MPs north of the Midlands, and with less than 20% of MPs in London. Additionally, the party also registered its lowest share of the vote since 1832 as well as its lowest vote in absolute terms since 1929. This would be the last election until 2024 that the Conservatives decreased their share of the vote.

The final result of the election on 2 May 1997 revealed that Labour had won a landslide majority, making a net gain of 146 seats and winning 43.2% of the vote. 150 Members of Parliament, including 133 Conservatives, lost their seats. The Conservatives, meanwhile, suffered defeat with a net loss of 178 seats, winning 30.7% of the vote. The Liberal Democrats led by Paddy Ashdown made a net gain of 28 seats, winning 16.8% of the vote. Labour's victory, the largest achieved in its history and by any political party in British politics since the Second World War, brought about the party's first of three consecutive terms in power (lasting a total of 13 years), with Blair as the newly appointed prime minister. The Liberal Democrats' success in the election, in part due to anti-Conservative tactical voting, strengthened both Ashdown's leadership and the party's position as a strong third party, having won the highest number of seats by any third party since 1929.

The Conservatives lost many ministers such as Michael Portillo, Tony Newton, Malcolm Rifkind, Ian Lang and William Waldegrave and controversial MPs such as Neil Hamilton and Jonathan Aitken, while some of the Conservative newcomers in this election were future Prime Minister Theresa May, future Chancellor of the Exchequer Philip Hammond, future Leader of the House Andrew Lansley, and future Speaker John Bercow. Meanwhile, Labour newcomers included future Cabinet and Shadow Cabinet members Hazel Blears, Ben Bradshaw, Yvette Cooper, Caroline Flint, Barry Gardiner, Alan Johnson, Ruth Kelly, John McDonnell, Stephen Twigg and Rosie Winterton, as well as future Scottish Labour Leader Jim Murphy and future Speaker Lindsay Hoyle. The election of 120 women, including 101 to the Labour benches, came to be seen as a watershed moment in female political representation in the UK.

== Background ==
The British economy had been in recession at the time of the 1992 general election, which the governing Conservative Party led by John Major had won. The recession ended within a year, but later events such as Black Wednesday severely tarnished the Conservative government's reputation for economic management. Meanwhile, the opposition Labour Party elected John Smith as its leader in 1992 to succeed Neil Kinnock; however, Smith's death from a heart attack in 1994 led to a leadership election which was won by Shadow Home Secretary Tony Blair.

Blair sought to bring the party closer to the political centre of the era, including rebranding the party as "New Labour". He convinced the party's members and affiliated trades unions to support the removal of Clause IV from its constitution, which had committed it to the mass nationalisation of industry, and the party also reversed its policy on unilateral nuclear disarmament. The events of Black Wednesday also meant Labour—and shadow chancellor Gordon Brown—were perceived as offering more competent economic management than the Conservatives.

Labour's manifesto, New Labour, New Life for Britain, was published in 1996 and outlined five key pledges:

- Class sizes to be cut to 30 or under for 5-, 6- and 7-year-olds by using money from the assisted places scheme.
- Fast track punishment for persistent young offenders, by halving the time from arrest to sentencing.
- Cut NHS waiting lists by treating an extra 100,000 patients as a first step by releasing £100 million saved from NHS red tape.
- Get 250,000 under-25-year-olds off benefit and into work by using money from a windfall levy on the privatised utilities.
- No rise in income tax rates, cut VAT on heating to 5%, and keeping inflation and interest rates as low as possible.

Disputes within the Conservative government over European Union issues, and a variety of "sleaze" allegations, severely affected the government's popularity. Despite the economic recovery and fall in unemployment in the four years leading up to the election, the rise in Conservative support was only marginal, with all of the major opinion polls showing Labour in a comfortable lead from late 1992 onwards.

Following the 1992 general election, the Conservatives remained in government with 336 of the 651 House of Commons seats, but through a series of defections and by-election defeats the government gradually lost its absolute majority. By 1997, the Conservatives held only 324 seats and had not won a by-election since Richmond in 1989.

== Timing ==
The previous Parliament first sat on 27 April 1992. The Parliament Act 1911 required at the time for each Parliament to be dissolved on the fifth anniversary of its first sitting; therefore, the latest date the dissolution and the summoning of the next parliament could have been held on was 27 April 1997.

The 1985 amendment of the Representation of the People Act 1983 required that the election must take place on the eleventh working day after the deadline for nomination papers, which in turn must be no more than six working days after the next parliament was summoned.

Therefore, the latest date the election could have been held on was 22 May 1997 (which happened to be a Thursday). British elections (and referendums) have been held on Thursdays by convention since the 1930s, but can be held on other working days.

== Campaign ==
Major called the election on Monday 17 March 1997, ensuring the formal campaign would be unusually long, at six weeks (Parliament was dissolved on 8 April). The election was scheduled for 1 May, to coincide with the local elections on the same day. This set a precedent, as the three subsequent general elections were also held alongside the May local elections.

The Conservatives argued that a long campaign would expose Labour and allow the Conservative message to be heard. However, Major was accused of arranging an early dissolution to protect Neil Hamilton from a pending parliamentary report into his conduct: a report that Major had earlier guaranteed would be published before the election.

In March 1997, soon after the election was called, Asda introduced a range of election-themed beers, these being "Major's Mild", "Tony's Tipple" and "Ashdown's Ale".

The political backdrop of campaigning focused on public opinion towards a change in government. Blair, as Labour leader, focused on transforming his party through a more centrist policy platform, titled "New Labour", with promises of devolution referendums for Scotland and Wales, fiscal responsibility, and a decision to nominate more female politicians for election through the use of all-women shortlists from which to choose candidates. Major sought to rebuild public trust in the Conservatives following a series of scandals, including the events of Black Wednesday in 1992, through campaigning on the strength of the economic recovery following the early 1990s recession, but faced divisions within the party over the UK's membership of the European Union.

Opinion polls during campaigning showed strong support for Labour due to Blair's personal popularity, and Blair won a personal public endorsement from The Sun newspaper two months before the vote.

=== Conservative campaign ===
Major hoped that a long campaign would expose Labour's "hollowness" and the Conservative campaign emphasised stability, as did its manifesto title 'You can only be sure with the Conservatives'. However, the campaign was beset by deep-set problems, such as the rise of James Goldsmith's Referendum Party which advocated a referendum on continued membership of the European Union. The party threatened to take away many right-leaning voters from the Conservatives. Furthermore, about 200 candidates broke with official Conservative policy to oppose British membership of the single European currency. Major fought back, saying: "Whether you agree with me or disagree with me; like me or loathe me, don't bind my hands when I am negotiating on behalf of the British nation." The moment is remembered as one of the defining, and most surreal, moments of the election.

Meanwhile, there was also division amongst the Conservative cabinet, with Chancellor Kenneth Clarke describing the views of Home Secretary Michael Howard on Europe as "paranoid and xenophobic nonsense". The Conservatives also struggled to come up with a definitive theme to attack Labour, with some strategists arguing for an approach which castigated Labour for "stealing Tory clothes" (copying their positions), with others making the case for a more confrontational approach, stating that "New Labour" was just a façade for "old Labour".

The New Labour, New Danger poster, which depicted Tony Blair with demon eyes, was an example of the latter strategy. Major veered between the two approaches, which left Conservative Central Office staff frustrated. As Andrew Cooper explained: "We repeatedly tried and failed to get him to understand that you couldn't say that they were dangerous and copying you at the same time." In any case, the campaign failed to gain much traction, and the Conservatives went down to a landslide defeat at the polls.

=== Labour campaign ===
Labour ran an effective campaign that emphasised the splits within the Conservative government and argued that the country needed a more centrist administration. It thus successfully picked up dissatisfied Conservative voters, particularly moderate and suburban ones. Tony Blair, who was personally highly popular, was very much the centrepiece of the campaign and proved a highly effective campaigner.

The Labour campaign was reminiscent of those of Bill Clinton for the US presidency in 1992 and 1996, focusing on centrist themes as well as adopting policies more commonly associated with the right, such as cracking down on crime and fiscal responsibility. The influence of political "spin" came into great effect for Labour at this point, as media centric figures such as Alastair Campbell and Peter Mandelson provided a clear cut campaign, and establishing a relatively new political brand New Labour with enviable success. In this election Labour adopted the theme Things Can Only Get Better in their campaign and advertising.

=== Liberal Democrat campaign ===
The Liberal Democrats had suffered a disappointing performance in 1992, but they were very much strengthened in 1997 due in part to potential tactical voting between Labour and Lib Dem supporters in Conservative marginal constituencies, particularly in the south of England – which explains why while given their share of the vote decreased, their number of seats nearly doubled. The Lib Dems promised to increase education funding paid for by a 1p increase in income tax.

== Endorsements ==
- In a sign of the change of direction which New Labour represented, they were endorsed by The Sun, as well as the more left-leaning newspapers the Daily Mirror, The Independent and The Guardian.
- The Conservatives were endorsed by the Daily Mail, the Daily Express and The Daily Telegraph.
- The Times did not endorse a specific party, but instead encouraged voters to support individual candidates "against the further integration of the European Union".

== Opinion polling ==
Labour Conservatives Liberal Democrats

== Notional 1992 results ==
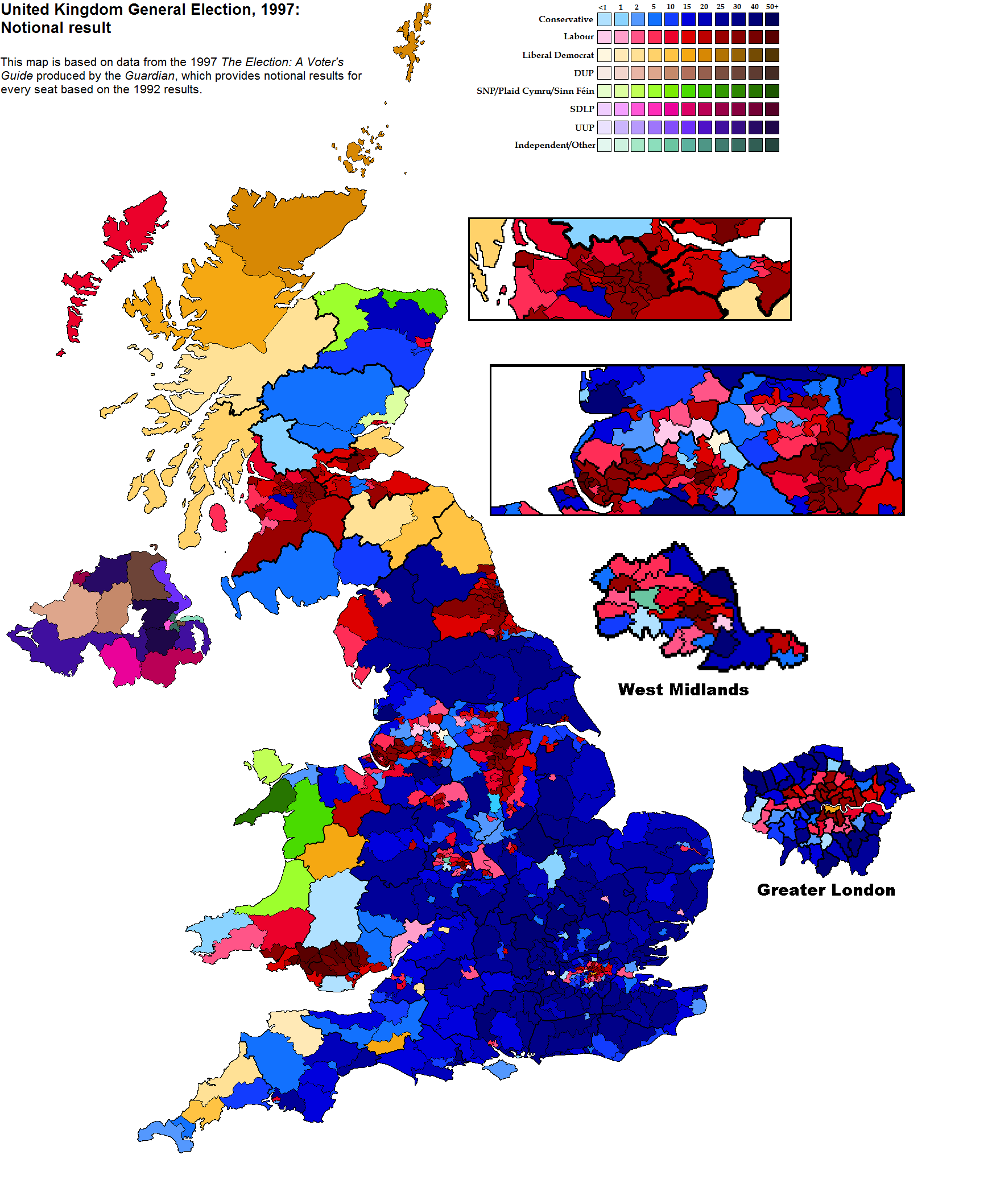
The notional results of the 1992 election, as shown on a map of the 1997 constituencies.

The election was fought under new boundaries, with a net increase of eight seats compared to the 1992 election (651 to 659). Changes listed here are from the notional 1992 result, had it been fought on the boundaries established in 1997. These notional results were calculated by Colin Rallings and Michael Thrasher and were used by all media organisations at the time.

Notional UK General Election 1992
Party	Seats	Gains	Losses	Net gain/loss	Seats %	Votes %	Votes	+/−
Labour	273	17	15	+2	41.6	34.4	11,560,484	
Conservative	343	28	21	+7	52.1	41.9	14,093,007	
Liberal Democrats	18	0	2	−2	2.7	17.8	5,999,384	
Other parties	25	1	0	+1	3.6	5.9		

== Results ==
Equal-area projection of constituencies

Result by countries and English regions

Labour won a landslide victory with its largest parliamentary majority (177) to date. On the BBC's election night programme Professor Anthony King described the result of the exit poll, which accurately predicted a Labour landslide, as being akin to "an asteroid hitting the planet and destroying practically all life on Earth". After years of trying, Labour had convinced the electorate that they would usher in a new age of prosperity—their policies, organisation and tone of optimism slotting perfectly into place.

Labour's victory was largely credited to the charisma of Tony Blair, as well as a Labour public relations machine managed by Alastair Campbell and Peter Mandelson. Between the 1992 election and the 1997 election there had also been major steps to "modernise" the party, including scrapping Clause IV that had committed the party to extending public ownership of industry. Labour had suddenly seized the middle ground of the political spectrum, attracting voters much further to the right than their traditional working class or left wing support. In the early hours of 2 May 1997 a party was held at the Royal Festival Hall, in which Blair stated that "a new dawn has broken, has it not?"

The election was a crushing defeat for the Conservatives, with the party having its lowest percentage share of the popular vote since 1832 under the Duke of Wellington's leadership, being wiped out in Scotland and Wales. A number of prominent Conservative MPs lost their seats in the election, including Michael Portillo, Malcolm Rifkind, Edwina Currie, David Mellor, Neil Hamilton and Norman Lamont, with Portillo's defeat in particular being the most symbolic since he was widely anticipated to challenge for the Conservatives' leadership upon the likely resignation of John Major. Such was the extent of Conservative losses at the election that Cecil Parkinson, speaking on the BBC's election night programme, joked upon the Conservatives winning their second seat that he was pleased that the subsequent election for the leadership would be contested.

The Liberal Democrats stood on a more left-wing manifesto than Labour, and more than doubled their number of seats thanks to the use of tactical voting against the Conservatives. Although their share of the vote fell slightly, their total of 46 MPs was the highest for any UK Liberal party since David Lloyd George led the party to 59 seats in 1929.

The Referendum Party, which sought a referendum on the United Kingdom's relationship with the European Union, came fourth in terms of votes with 800,000 votes and won no seats in parliament, whose leader James Goldsmith unsuccessfully contested the seat of Putney against incumbent former minister David Mellor (who ultimately lost the seat to Labour), with Goldsmith dying two months after the election, and the party dissolved shortly afterwards.

The six parties with the next highest votes stood only in either Scotland, Northern Ireland or Wales; in order, they were the Scottish National Party, the Ulster Unionist Party, the Social Democratic and Labour Party, Plaid Cymru, Sinn Féin, and the Democratic Unionist Party.

In the previously safe seat of Tatton, where incumbent Conservative MP Neil Hamilton was facing charges of having taken cash for questions, the Labour and Liberal Democrat parties decided not to field candidates in order that an independent candidate, Martin Bell, would have a better chance of winning the seat, which he did with a comfortable margin.

The result declared for the constituency of Winchester showed a margin of victory of just two votes for the Liberal Democrats. The defeated Conservative candidate mounted a successful legal challenge to the result on the grounds that errors by election officials (failures to stamp certain votes) had changed the result; the court ruled the result invalid and ordered a by-election on 20 November which was won by the Liberal Democrats with a much larger majority, causing much recrimination in the Conservative Party about the decision to challenge the original result in the first place.

This election saw a doubling of the number of women in parliament, from 60 elected in 1992 to 120 elected in 1997. 101 of them (controversially described as Blair Babes) were on the Labour benches, a number driven by the Labour Party's 1993 policy (ruled illegally discriminatory in 1996) of all-women shortlists. This election has therefore been widely seen as a watershed moment for representation of women in the UK.

This election marked the start of Labour government for the next 13 years, lasting until the formation of the Conservative-Liberal Democrat coalition in 2010.

=== Summary of seats returned ===
Party	Leader	MPs		Aggregate votes	
Party	Leader		Of total		Of total
Labour Party	Tony Blair	418 (Note: Includes 26 Co-operative Party MP, as part of the Labour-Co-op alliance.)	63.4%	13,518,167	43.2%
Conservative and Unionist Party	John Major	165	25.0%	9,600,943	30.7%
Liberal Democrats	Paddy Ashdown	46	7.0%	5,242,947	16.8%
Ulster Unionist Party	David Trimble	10	1.5%	258,349	0.8%
Scottish National Party	Alex Salmond	6	0.9%	621,550	2.0%
Plaid Cymru	Dafydd Wigley	4	0.6%	161,030	0.5%
Social Democratic and Labour Party	John Hume	3	0.5%	190,814	0.6%
Sinn Féin	Gerry Adams	2	0.3%	126,921	0.4%
Democratic Unionist Party	Ian Paisley	2	0.3%	107,348	0.3%
Independent	—N/a	1	0.2%	64,482	0.2%
Speaker	Betty Boothroyd	1	0.2%	23,969	0.1%
UK Unionist Party	Robert McCartney	1	0.2%	12,817	0.0%

=== Full results ===

1997 United Kingdom general election
		Candidates						Votes		
Party	Leader	Stood	Elected	Gained	Unseated	Net	% of total	%	No.	Net %
Labour	Tony Blair	639 (Note: Includes 26 Co-operative Party candidates, as part of the Labour-Co-op alliance)	418 (Note: Includes 26 Co-operative Party MPs, as part of the Labour-Co-op alliance)	146	0	+145 (Note: Includes +12 Co-operative Party MPs, as part of the Labour-Co-op alliance)	63.4 (Note: Includes 3.9% for the Co-operative Party, as part of the Labour-Co-op alliance)	43.2 (Note: Includes 2.1% for the Co-operative Party, as part of the Labour-Co-op alliance)	13,518,167 (Note: Includes 654,203 for the Co-operative Party, as part of the Labour-Co-op alliance)	+8.8 (Note: Includes +0.6% for the Co-operative Party, as part of the Labour-Co-op alliance)
Conservative	John Major	648	165	0	178	–178	25.0	30.7	9,600,943	–11.2
Liberal Democrats	Paddy Ashdown	639	46	30	2	+28	7.0	16.8	5,242,947	–1.0
Referendum	James Goldsmith	547	0	0	0	0		2.6	811,849	N/A
SNP	Alex Salmond	72	6	3	0	+3	0.9	2.0	621,550	+0.1
UUP	David Trimble	16	10	1	0	+1	1.5	0.8	258,349	0.0
SDLP	John Hume	18	3	0	1	–1	0.5	0.6	190,814	+0.1
Plaid Cymru	Dafydd Wigley	40	4	0	0	0	0.6	0.5	161,030	0.0
Sinn Féin	Gerry Adams	17	2	2	0	+2	0.3	0.4	126,921	0.0
DUP	Ian Paisley	9	2	0	1	–1	0.3	0.3	107,348	0.0
UKIP	Alan Sked	193	0	0	0	0		0.3	105,722	N/A
Independent	N/A	25	1	1	0	+1	0.2	0.2	64,482	0.0
Alliance	John Alderdice	17	0	0	0	0		0.2	62,972	0.0
Green	Peg Alexander and David Taylor	89	0	0	0	0		0.2	61,731	–0.2
Socialist Labour	Arthur Scargill	64	0	0	0	0		0.2	52,109	N/A
Liberal	Michael Meadowcroft	53	0	0	0	0		0.1	45,166	–0.1
BNP	John Tyndall	57	0	0	0	0		0.1	35,832	0.0
Natural Law	Geoffrey Clements	197	0	0	0	0		0.1	30,604	–0.1
Speaker	Betty Boothroyd	1	1	1	0	0		0.1	23,969	
ProLife Alliance	Bruno Quintavalle	56	0	0	0	0		0.1	19,332	N/A
UK Unionist	Robert McCartney	1	1	1	0	+1	0.2	0.0	12,817	N/A
PUP	Hugh Smyth	3	0	0	0	0		0.0	10,928	N/A
National Democrats	Ian Anderson	21	0	0	0	0		0.0	10,829	N/A
Socialist	Peter Taaffe		0	0	0	0		0.0	9,906	N/A
Scottish Socialist	Tommy Sheridan	16	0	0	0	0		0.0	9,740	N/A
Independent	N/A	4	0	0	0	0		0.0	9,233	– 0.1
Ind. Conservative	N/A	4	0	0	0	0		0.0	8,608	–0.1
Monster Raving Loony	Screaming Lord Sutch	24	0	0	0	0		0.0	7,906	–0.1
Make Politicians History	Rainbow George Weiss	29	0	0	0	0		0.0	3,745	N/A
NI Women's Coalition	Monica McWilliams and Pearl Sagar	3	0	0	0	0		0.0	3,024	N/A
Workers' Party	Tom French	8	0	0	0	0		0.0	2,766	–0.1
National Front	John McAuley	6	0	0	0	0		0.0	2,716	N/A
Cannabis Law Reform	Howard Marks	4	0	0	0	0		0.0	2,085	N/A
Socialist People's Party	Jim Hamezian	1	0	0	0	0		0.0	1,995	N/A
Mebyon Kernow	Loveday Jenkin	4	0	0	0	0		0.0	1,906	N/A
Green	Robin Harper	5	0	0	0	0		0.0	1,721	
Conservative Anti-Euro	Christopher Story	1	0	0	0	0		0.0	1,434	N/A
Socialist (GB)	None	5	0	0	0	0		0.0	1,359	N/A
Community Representative	Ralph Knight	1	0	0	0	0		0.0	1,290	N/A
Neighborhood association		1	0	0	0	0		0.0	1,263	N/A
SDP	John Bates	2	0	0	0	0		0.0	1,246	–0.1
Workers Revolutionary	Sheila Torrance	9	0	0	0	0		0.0	1,178	N/A
Real Labour	N/A	1	0	0	0	0		0.0	1,117	N/A
Independent Democrat	N/A		0	0	0	0		0.0	982	
Independent	N/A		0	0	0	0		0.0	890	
Communist	Mike Hicks	3	0	0	0	0		0.0	639	
Independent	N/A	1	0	0	0	0		0.0	593	
Green (NI)		1	0	0	0	0		0.0	539	
Socialist Equality	Davy Hyland	3	0	0	0	0		0.0	505	

All parties with more than 500 votes shown. Labour total includes New Labour and "Labour Time for Change" candidates; Conservative total includes candidates in Northern Ireland (excluded in some lists) and "Loyal Conservative" candidate.

The Popular Unionist MP elected in 1992 died in 1995, and the party folded shortly afterwards.

There was no incumbent Speaker in the 1992 election.

Government's new majority	177
Total votes cast	31,286,284
Turnout	71.3%

Seats won in the election (outer ring) against number of votes (inner ring).

Popular vote
Labour	43.2%
Conservative	30.7%
Liberal Democrat	16.8%
Referendum	2.6%
Scottish National	2.0%
Others	1.9%

Parliamentary seats
Labour	63.4%
Conservative	25.0%
Liberal Democrat	7.0%
Scottish National	0.9%
Ulster Unionist	1.5%
Others	2.1%

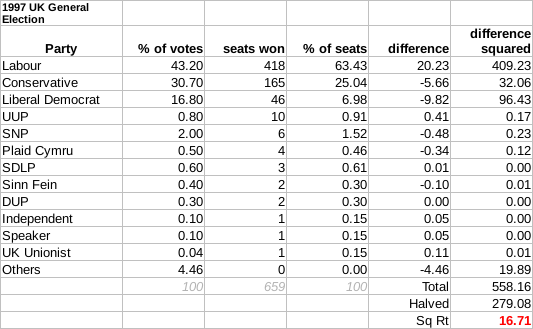
The disproportionality of the house of parliament in the 1997 election was 16.71 according to the Gallagher Index, mainly between Labour and the Liberal Democrats.

=== Results by constituent country ===
	LAB	CON	LD	SNP	PC	NI parties	Others	Total
England	328	165	34	-	-	-	2	529
Wales	34	-	2	-	4	-	-	40
Scotland	56	-	10	6	-	-	-	72
Northern Ireland	-	-	-	-	-	18	-	18
Total	418	165	46	6	4	18	2 (inc Speaker)	659

=== Results by voter characteristics ===
Ethnic group voting intention
Ethnic group	Party			
Ethnic group	Labour	Conservative	SDP/Lib	Other
Ethnic minority (non-White)	78%	17%	n/a	5%
Asian	70%	25%	4%	1%
Afro-Caribbean	86%	8%	4%	1%

== Post-election events ==
The poor results for the Conservative Party led to infighting, with the One Nation group, Tory Reform Group, and right-wing Maastricht Rebels blaming each other for the defeat. Party chairman Brian Mawhinney said on the night of the election that defeat was due to disillusionment with 18 years of Conservative rule. John Major resigned as party leader, saying "When the curtain falls, it is time to get off the stage". Despite his well-publicised defeat, Michael Portillo returned to Parliament in a by-election two and a half years later.

Following the defeat, the Conservatives began their longest continuous spell in opposition in the history of the present day (post–Tamworth Manifesto) Conservative Party – and indeed the longest such spell for any incarnation of the Tories/Conservatives since the 1760s and the end of the Whig Supremacy under Kings George I and George II – lasting 13 years, including the whole of the 2000s. Throughout this period, their representation in the Commons remained consistently below 200 MPs.

Meanwhile, Paddy Ashdown's continued leadership of the Liberal Democrats was assured, and they were felt to be in a position to build positively as a strong third party into the new millennium, culminating in their sharing power in the 2010 coalition with the Conservatives.

== Internet coverage ==
With the huge rise in internet use since the previous general election, BBC News created a special website – BBC Politics 97 – covering the election. This site was an experiment for the efficiency of an online news service which was due for launch later in the year.

== See also ==
- List of MPs elected in the 1997 United Kingdom general election
- 1997 United Kingdom general election in England
- 1997 United Kingdom general election in Scotland
- 1997 United Kingdom general election in Wales
- 1997 United Kingdom general election in Northern Ireland
- 1997 United Kingdom local elections
- 1990s in political history
