= 1997 United Kingdom general election in Wales =

- 1 May 1997

All 40 Welsh seats to the House of Commons
- Turnout: 73.5% (▼6.2 pp)
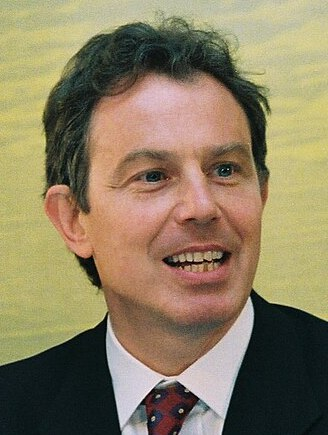

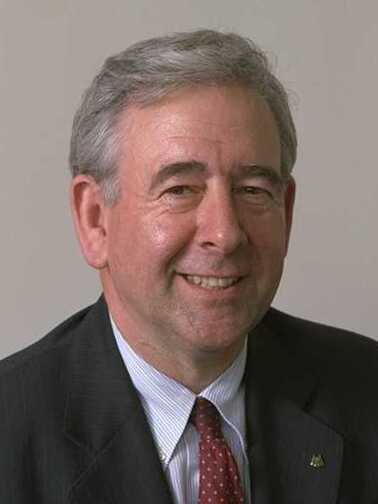

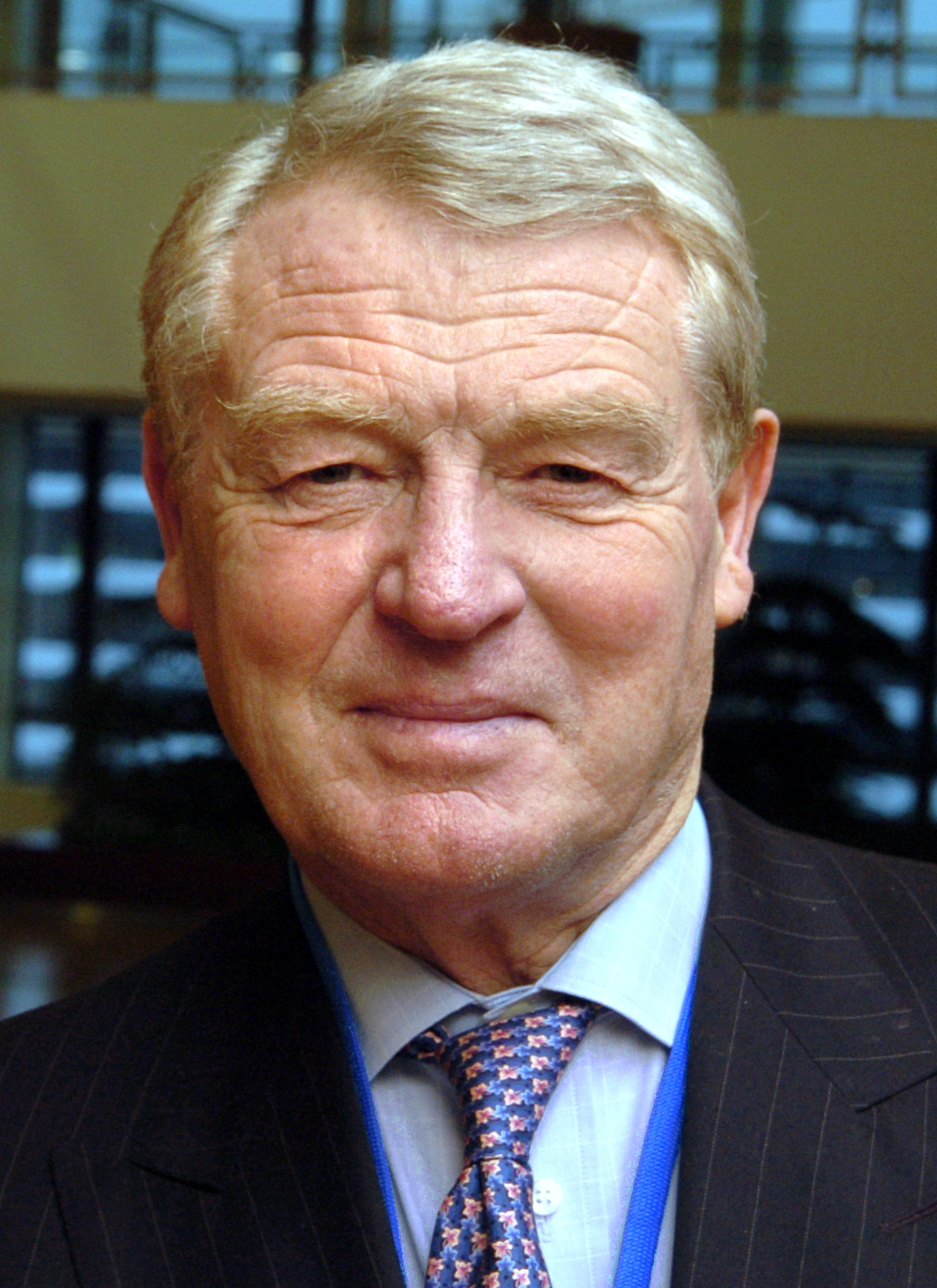

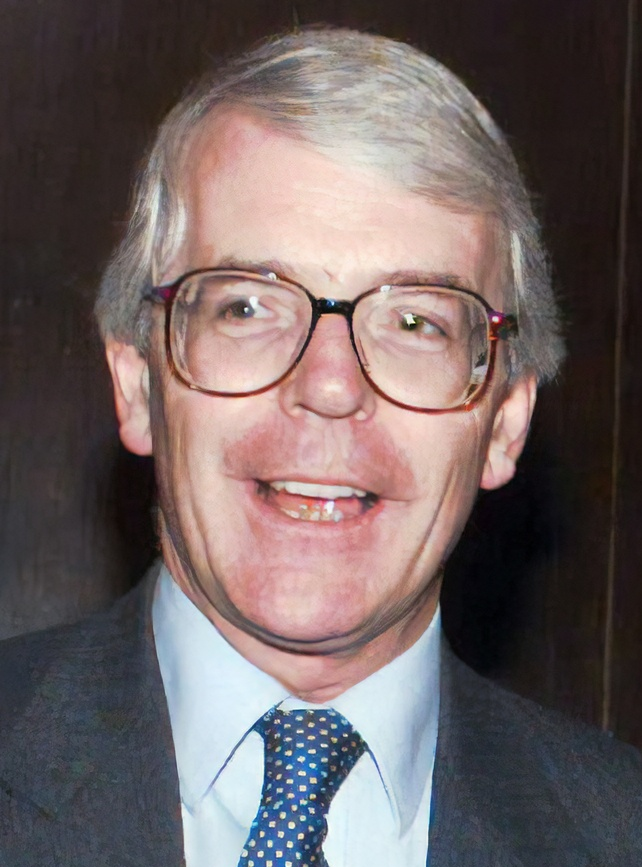
	First party	Second party
Leader	Tony Blair	Dafydd Wigley
Party	Labour	Plaid Cymru
Leader since	21 July 1994	26 October 1991
Leader's seat	Sedgefield	Caernarfon
Last election	27 seats, 49.5%	4 seats, 8.9%
Seats before	27^{†}	4^{†}
Seats won	34	4
Seat change	▲7*	Steady
Popular vote	886,935	161,030
Percentage	54.7%	10.0%
Swing	▲5.2 pp	▲1.1 pp
	Third party	Fourth party
Leader	Paddy Ashdown	John Major
Party	Liberal Democrats	Conservative
Leader since	16 July 1988	27 November 1990 (Note: Major resigned as Leader of the Conservative Party on 22 June 1995 to face critics in his party and government, and was re-elected as Leader on 4 July 1995)
Leader's seat	Yeovil	Huntingdon
Last election	1 seat, 12.4%	8 seats, 28.6%
Seats before	1^{†}	8^{†}
Seats won	2	0
Seat change	▲1*	▼8
Popular vote	200,020	317,145
Percentage	12.4%	19.6%
Swing	▼0.1 pp	▼9.0 pp
- ^{†}Notional 1992 results if held on the 1997 boundaries *Indicates boundary change - so this is a notional figure.

On Thursday 1 May 1997, the 1997 United Kingdom general election was held in Wales, to elect all 659 members of the House of Commons, with 40 constituencies being in Wales. The Labour Party won a landslide majority of Welsh MPs, gaining seven seats for a total of 34 out of 40. The Liberal Democrats gained one seat, whilst Plaid Cymru retained their four MPs.

The Conservatives lost all of their Welsh MPs, leaving them without representation in Wales for the first time since the 1906 general election. They would not gain another MP until the 2005 general election.

== Candidates ==
Below is a table summarising the candidates of the 1997 general election in Wales.

Affiliation	Candidates
Labour Party	40
Conservative and Unionist Party	40
Liberal Democrats	40
Plaid Cymru	40
Referendum Party	35
Natural Law Party	5
Socialist Labour Party	5
Green Party of England and Wales	4
Independent	3
UK Independence Party	2
Socialist Party	2
Independent Labour	2
Communist Party of Britain	1
ProLife Alliance	1
Official Monster Raving Loony Party	1
Independent Liberal Democrat	1 (Note: Candidate Richard Bradley stood in Conwy.)
Legalise Cannabis Alliance	1
Total	223

== Results ==
Below is a table summarising the results of the 1997 general election in Wales.

Party	Seats					Aggregate votes		
Party	Total	Gains	Losses	Net	Of total (%)	Total	Of total (%)	Change (%)
Labour	34	7	0	▲7	85.0	886,935	54.7	▲5.2
Conservative	0	0	8	▼8	—	317,145	19.6	▼9.0
Liberal Democrats	2	1	0	▲1	5.0	200,020	12.4	▼0.1
Plaid Cymru	4	0	0	Steady	10.0	161,030	10.0	▲1.1
Referendum	0	New			—	38,245	2.4	New
Socialist Labour	0	New			—	6,203	0.4	New
Independent Labour	0	Did not stand in 1992			—	4,633	0.0	—N/a
Green	0	0	0	Steady	—	1,718	0.1	▼0.3
Independent	0	0	0	Steady	—	1,046	0.1	▲0.1
Socialist	0	New			—	633	0.0	New
UKIP	0	New			—	616	0.0	New
Natural Law	0	0	0	Steady	—	516	0.0	▼0.1
Legalise Cannabis	0	New			—	420	0.2	New
ProLife Alliance	0	New			—	270	0.0	New
Ind. Lib Dem	0	New			—	250	0.0	New
Monster Raving Loony	0	New			—	204	0.0	New
Communist	0	0	0	Steady	—	178	0.0	Steady
Total	40			0	100.0	1,620,256	100.0	0.0
Registered voters, and turnout							73.5	▼6.2

Popular vote
Labour	54.7%
Conservative	19.6%
Liberal Democrats	12.4%
Plaid Cymru	10.0%
Other	3.4%

Parliament seats
Labour	85.0%
Plaid Cymru	10.0%
Liberal Democrats	5.0%

== Results by constituency ==
The following is the results by constituency by Senedd electoral region:

=== Mid and West Wales ===
Mid and West Wales elected 8 Members of Parliament.

Constituency	Candidates						Incumbent
Constituency	Labour	Conservative	Liberal Democrat	Plaid Cymru	Referendum	Other	Incumbent
Brecon and Radnorshire	Christopher Mann 11,424 (26.6%)	Jonathan Evans 12,419 (29.0%)	Richard Livsey 17,516 (40.8%)	Steven Cornelius 622 (1.5%)	Elizabeth Phillips 900 (2.1%)		Jonathan Evans
Carmarthen East and Dinefwr	Alan Williams 17,907 (42.9%)	Edmund Hayward 5,022 (12.0%)	Juliana Hughes 3,150 (7.5%)	Rhodri Glyn Thomas 14,457 (34.6%)	Ian Humphreys-Evans 1,196 (2.9%)		Alan Williams‡ (Carmarthen)
Carmarthen West and South Pembrokeshire	Nick Ainger 20,956 (49.1%)	Owen Williams 11,335 (26.6%)	Keith Evans 3,516 (8.2%)	Roy Llewellyn 5,402 (12.7%)	Joy Poirrier 1,432 (3.4%)		Nick Ainger‡ (Pembrokeshire)
Ceredigion	Robert (Hag) Harris 9,767 (24.3%)	Felix Aubel 5,983 (14.9%)	Dai Davies 6,616 (16.5%)	Cynog Dafis 16,728 (41.6%)	John Leaney 1,092 (2.7%)		Cynog Dafis‡ (Ceredigion and Pembroke North)
Llanelli	Denzil Davies 23,851 (57.9%)	Andrew Hayes 5,003 (12.1%)	Nick Burree 3,788 (9.2%)	Marc Phillips 7,812 (19.0%)		John Willock (SLP) 757 (1.8%)	Denzil Davies
Meirionnydd Nant Conwy	Hefin E. Rees 5,660 (23.0%)	Jeremy Quin 3,922 (16.0%)	Robina L. Feeley 1,719 (7.0%)	Elfyn Llwyd 12,465 (50.7%)	Phillip H. Hodge 809 (3.3%)		Elfyn Llwyd
Montgomeryshire	Angharad Davies 6,109 (19.1%)	Glyn Davies 8,344 (26.1%)	Lembit Öpik 14,647 (45.9%)	Helen Mary Jones 1,608 (5.0%)	John Bufton 879 (2.8%)	Susan Walker (Green) 338 (1.1%)	Alex Carlile†
Preseli Pembrokeshire	Jackie Lawrence 20,477 (48.3%)	Robert Buckland 11,741 (27.7%)	Jeffrey Clarke 5,527 (13.0%)	Alun Jones 2,683 (6.3%)	David Berry 1,574 (3.7%)	Molly Scott Cato (Green) 401 (0.9%)	Nick Ainger‡ (Pembrokeshire)

=== North Wales ===
North Wales elected 9 Members of Parliament.

Constituency	Candidates						Incumbent
Constituency	Labour	Conservative	Liberal Democrat	Plaid Cymru	Referendum	Other	Incumbent
Alyn and Deeside	Barry Jones 25,955 (61.9%)	Timothy P. Roberts 9,552 (22.8%)	Eleanor Burnham 4,076 (9.7%)	Siw Hills 738 (1.8%)	Malcolm J. D. Jones 1,627 (3.9%)		Barry Jones
Caernarfon	Eifion Wyn Williams 10,167 (29.5%)	Elwyn Williams 4,230 (12.3%)	Mary Macqueen 1,686 (4.9%)	Dafydd Wigley 17,616 (51.0%)	Clive Collins 811 (2.4%)		Dafydd Wigley
Conwy	Betty Williams 14,561 (35.0%)	David Jones 10,085 (24.3%)	Roger Roberts 12,965 (31.2%)	Rhodri Davies 2,844 (6.8%)	Allan Barham 760 (1.8%)	Richard Bradley (Ind.) 250 (0.6%) David Hughes (NLP) 95 (0.2%)	Wyn Roberts†
Clwyd South	Martyn Jones 22,901 (58.1%)	Boris Johnson 9,091 (23.1%)	Andrew Chadwick 3,684 (9.4%)	Gareth Williams 2,500 (6.3%)	Alex Lewis 1,207 (3.1%)		Martyn Jones‡ (Clwyd South West)
Clwyd West	Gareth Thomas 14,918 (37.1%)	Rod Richards 13,070 (32.5%)	Gwyn Williams 5,151 (12.8%)	Eryl W. Williams 5,421 (12.8%)	Heather Bennett-Collins 1,114 (2.8%)	David K. Neal (Conservatory) 583 (1.3%)	Rod Richards‡ (Clwyd North West)
Delyn	David Hanson 23,300 (57.2%)	Karen Lumley 10,607 (26.0%)	David Lloyd 4,160 (10.2%)	Ashley J. Drake 1,558 (3.8%)	Elizabeth H. Soutter 1,117 (2.7%)		David Hanson
Vale of Clwyd	Chris Ruane 20,617 (52.7%)	David Edwards 11,662 (29.8%)	Daniel Munford 3,425 (8.8%)	Gwyneth Kensler 2,301 (5.9%)	Simon Vickers 834 (2.1%)	Scott Cooke (UKIP) 293 (0.7%)	New constituency
Wrexham	John Marek 20,450 (56.1%)	Stuart Andrew 8,688 (23.9%)	Andrew Thomas 4,833 (13.3%)	Kevin Plant 1,170 (3.2%)	John Cronk 1,195 (3.3%)	Nicholas Low (NLP) 86 (0.2%)	John Marek
Ynys Môn	Owen Edwards 13,275 (33.2%)	Gwilym Owen 8,569 (21.5%)	Deric Burnham 1,537 (3.8%)	Ieuan Wyn Jones 15,756 (39.5%)	Hugh Gray-Morris 793 (2.0%)		Ieuan Wyn Jones

=== South Central Wales ===
South Central Wales elected 8 Members of Parliament.

Constituency	Candidates						Incumbent
Constituency	Labour	Conservative	Liberal Democrat	Plaid Cymru	Referendum	Other	Incumbent
Cardiff Central	Jon Owen Jones 18,464 (43.7%)	David Melding 8,470 (20.0%)	Jenny Randerson 10,541 (24.9%)	Wayne Vernon 1,504 (3.6%)	Nick Lloyd 760 (1.8%)	Terence Burns (SLP) 2,230 (5.3%) Craig James (OMRLP) 204 (0.5%) Anthony Hobbs (NLP) 80 (0.2%)	Jon Owen Jones
Cardiff North	Julie Morgan 24,460 (50.4%)	Gwilym Jones 16,334 (33.7%)	Robyn Rowland 5,294 (10.9%)	Colin Palfrey 1,201 (2.5%)	Edward J. Litchfield 1,199 (2.5%)		Gwilym Jones
Cardiff South and Penarth	Alun Michael 22,647 (53.4%)	Caroline E. Roberts 8,786 (20.7%)	Simon J. Wakefield 3,964 (9.3%)	David B. L. Haswell 1,356 (3.2%)	Phillip S. E. Morgan 1,211 (2.9%)	John Foreman (New Labour) 3,942 (9.3%) Mike K. Shepherd (Socialist Alternative) 344 (0.8%) Barbara Caves (NLP) 170 (0.4%)	Alun Michael
Cardiff West	Rhodri Morgan 24,297 (60.3%)	Simon Hoare 8,669 (21.5%)	Jacqui Gasson 4,366 (10.8%)	Gwenllian Carr 1,949 (4.8%)	Trefor Johns 996 (2.5%)		Rhodri Morgan
Cynon Valley	Ann Clwyd 23,307 (69.7%)	Andrew Smith 2,260 (6.8%)	Huw Price 3,459 (10.3%)	Alun Davies 3,552 (10.6%)	Gwyn John 844 (2.5%)		Ann Clwyd
Pontypridd	Kim Howells 29,290 (63.9%)	Jonathan M. Cowen 5,910 (12.9%)	Nigel Howells 6,161 (13.4%)	Owain Llewelyn 2,977 (6.5%)	John Wood 874 (1.9%)	Peter Skelly (SLP) 380 (0.8%) Robert Griffiths (Communist) 178 (0.4%) Anthony G. Moore (NLP) 85 (0.2%)	Kim Howells
Rhondda	Allan Rogers 30,381 (74.5%)	Steven Whiting 1,551 (3.8%)	Rodney Berman 2,307 (5.7%)	Leanne Wood 5,450 (13.4%)	Stephen Gardiner 658 (1.6%)	Kevin Jakeway (Green) 460 (1.1%)	Allan Rogers
Vale of Glamorgan	John Smith 29,054 (53.9%)	Walter Sweeney 18,522 (34.4%)	Suzanne Campbell 4,945 (9.2%)	Melanie Corp 1,393 (2.6%)			Walter Sweeney

=== South East Wales ===
South East Wales elected 8 Members of Parliament.

Constituency	Candidates						Incumbent
Constituency	Labour	Conservative	Liberal Democrat	Plaid Cymru	Referendum	Other	Incumbent
Blaenau Gwent	Llew Smith 31,493 (79.5%)	Margrit A. Williams 2,607 (6.6%)	Geraldine Layton 3,458 (8.7%)	Jim B. Criddle 2,072 (5.2%)			Llew Smith
Caerphilly	Ron Davies 30,697 (67.3%)	Rhodri Harris 4,858 (10.7%)	Tony D. Ferguson 3,724 (8.2%)	Lindsay Whittle 4,383 (9.7%)	Mark E. Morgan 1,337 (3.0%)	Catherine Williams (PLA) 270 (0.6%)	Ron Davies
Islwyn	Don Touhig 26,995 (74.2%)	David Walters 2,864 (7.9%)	Christopher Worker 3,064 (8.4%)	Darren Jones 2,272 (6.2%)	Susan Monaghan 1,209 (3.3%)		Don Touhig
Merthyr Tydfil and Rhymney	Ted Rowlands 30,012 (76.7%)	Jonathan Morgan 2,508 (6.4%)	Duncan Anstey 2,926 (7.5%)	Alun Cox 2,344 (6.0%)	Ronald Hutchings 660 (1.7%)	Alan Cowdell (Ind. Lab.) 691 (1.8%)	Ted Rowlands
Monmouth	Huw Edwards 23,404 (47.7%)	Roger Evans 19,226 (39.2%)	Mark Williams 4,689 (9.6%)	Alan Cotton 516 (1.1%)	Timothy Warry 1,190 (2.4%)		Roger Evans
Newport East	Alan Howarth 21,481 (57.7%)	David Evans 7,958 (21.4%)	Alistair Cameron 3,880 (10.4%)	Christopher Holland 721 (1.9%)	Edward Chaney-Davis 1,267 (3.4%)	Arthur Scargill (SLP) 1,951 (5.2%)	Roy Hughes†
Newport West	Paul Flynn 24,331 (60.5%)	Peter Clarke 9,794 (24.4%)	Stanley Wilson 3,907 (9.7%)	Huw Jackson 648 (1.6%)	Andrew Thompsett 1,199 (3.0%)	Hugh Hughes (UKIP) 323 (0.3%)	Paul Flynn
Torfaen	Paul Murphy 29,863 (69.1%)	Neil Parish 5,327 (12.3%)	Jean Gray 5,249 (12.1%)	Robert Gough 1,042 (2.4%)	Deborah Holler 1,245 (2.9%)	Roger Coghill (Green) 519 (1.2%)	Paul Murphy

=== South West Wales ===
South West Wales elected 7 Members of Parliament.

Constituency	Candidates						Incumbent
Constituency	Labour	Conservative	Liberal Democrat	Plaid Cymru	Referendum	Other	Incumbent
Aberavon	John Morris 25,650 (71.3%)	Peter Harper 2,835 (7.9%)	Ronald McConville 4,079 (11.3%)	Philip Cockwell 2,088 (5.8%)	Peter David 970 (2.7%)	Captain Beany (Independent) 341 (1.0%)	John Morris
Bridgend	Win Griffiths 25,115 (58.1%)	David Davies 9,867 (22.8%)	Andrew Mckinlay 4,968 (11.5%)	Dennis R. Watkins 1,649 (3.8%)	Tudor Greaves 1,662 (3.8%)		Win Griffiths
Gower	Martin Caton 23,313 (53.8%)	Alun Cairns 10,306 (23.8%)	Howard W. Evans 5,624 (13.0%)	D Elwyn Williams 2,226 (5.1%)	Richard D. Lewis 1,745 (4.0%)	Anthony G. Popham (Independent) 122 (0.3%)	Gareth Wardell†
Neath	Peter Hain 30,324 (73.5%)	David M. Evans 3,583 (8.7%)	Frank H. Little 2,597 (6.3%)	Trefor Jones 3,344 (8.1%)	Peter A. Morris 975 (2.4%)	Howard Marks (Legalise Cannabis Party) 420 (1.0%)	Peter Hain
Ogmore	Ray Powell 28,163 (74.0%)	David A. Unwin 3,716 (9.8%)	Kirsty Williams 3,510 (9.2%)	John D. Rogers 2,679 (7.0%)			Ray Powell
Swansea East	Donald Anderson 29,151 (75.4%)	Catherine Dibble 3,582 (9.3%)	Elwyn Jones 3,440 (8.9%)	Michelle Pooley 1,308 (2.3%)	Catherine Maggs 904 (2.3%)	Ronnie Job (Socialist Alternative) 289 (0.8%)	Donald Anderson
Swansea West	Alan Williams 22,748 (56.2%)	Andrew Baker 8,289 (20.5%)	John Newbury 5,872 (14.5%)	Dai Lloyd 2,675 (6.6%)		David Proctor (SLP) 885 (2.2%)	Alan Williams

== See also ==
- 1997 United Kingdom general election in England
- 1997 United Kingdom general election in Scotland
- 1997 United Kingdom general election in Northern Ireland
- List of MPs for constituencies in Wales (1997–2001)
