= 1997 United Kingdom general election in Northern Ireland =

- 1 May 1997

All 18 Northern Ireland seats in the House of Commons
- Turnout: 67.1 (▼2.7 pp)
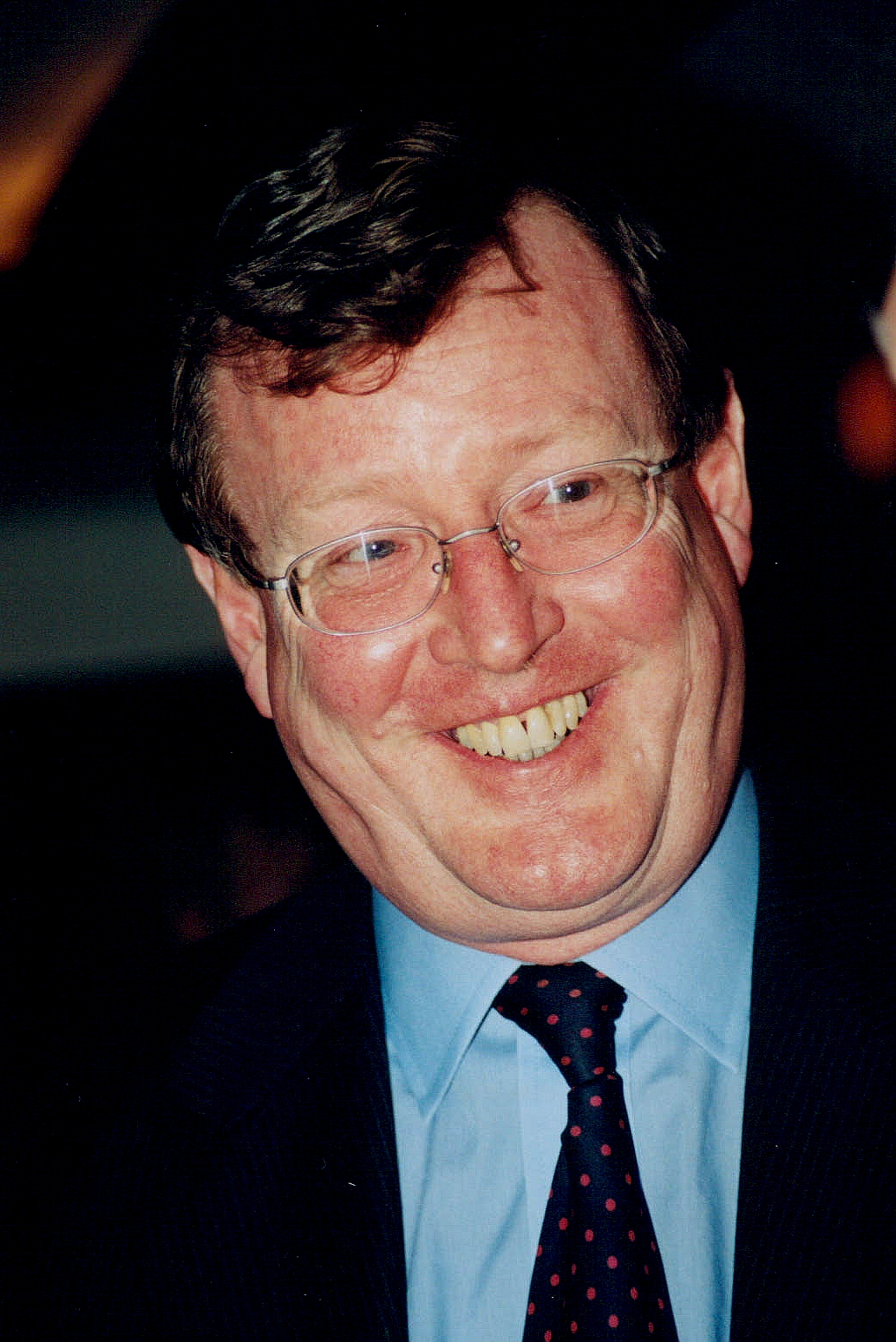

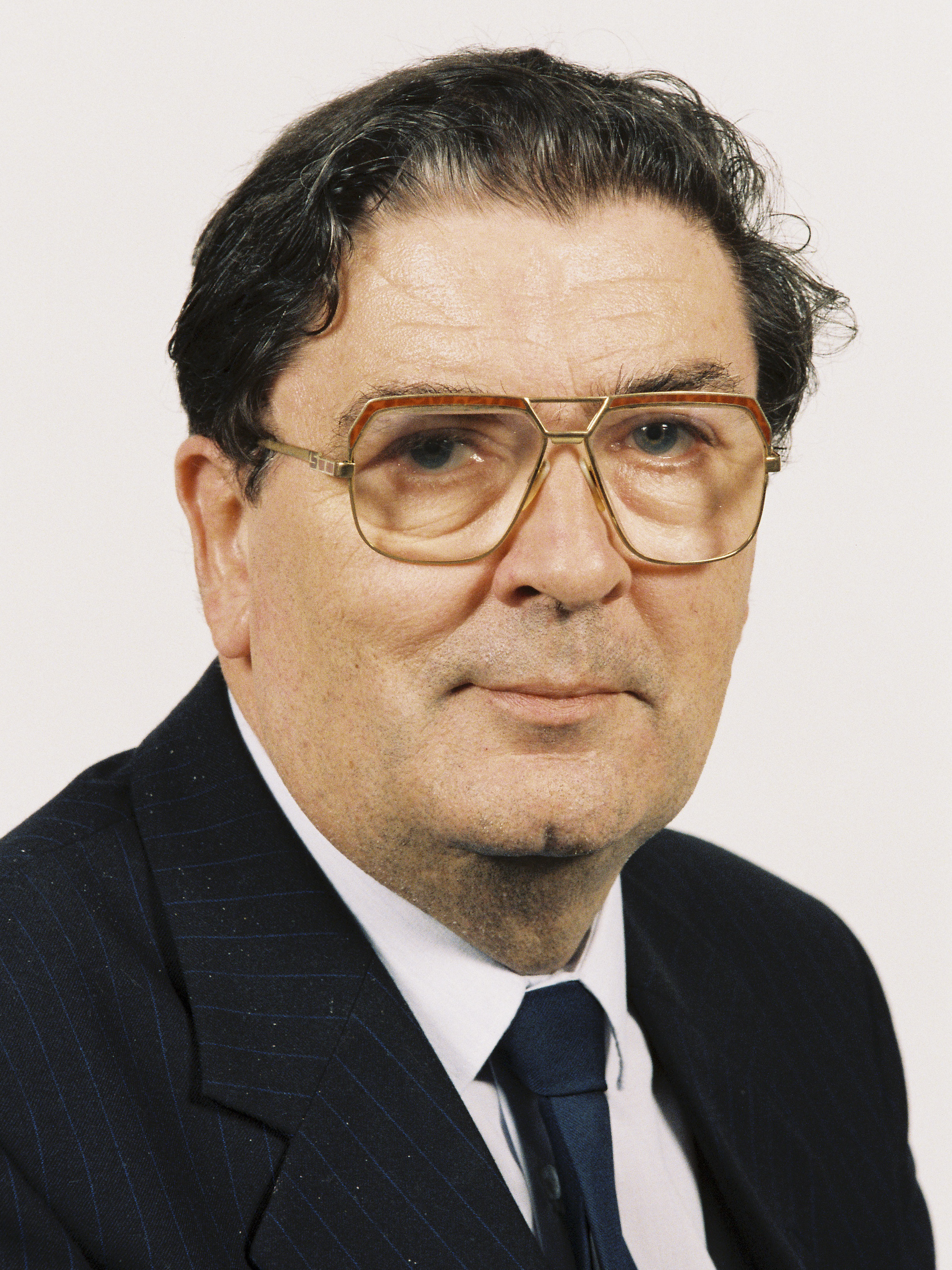

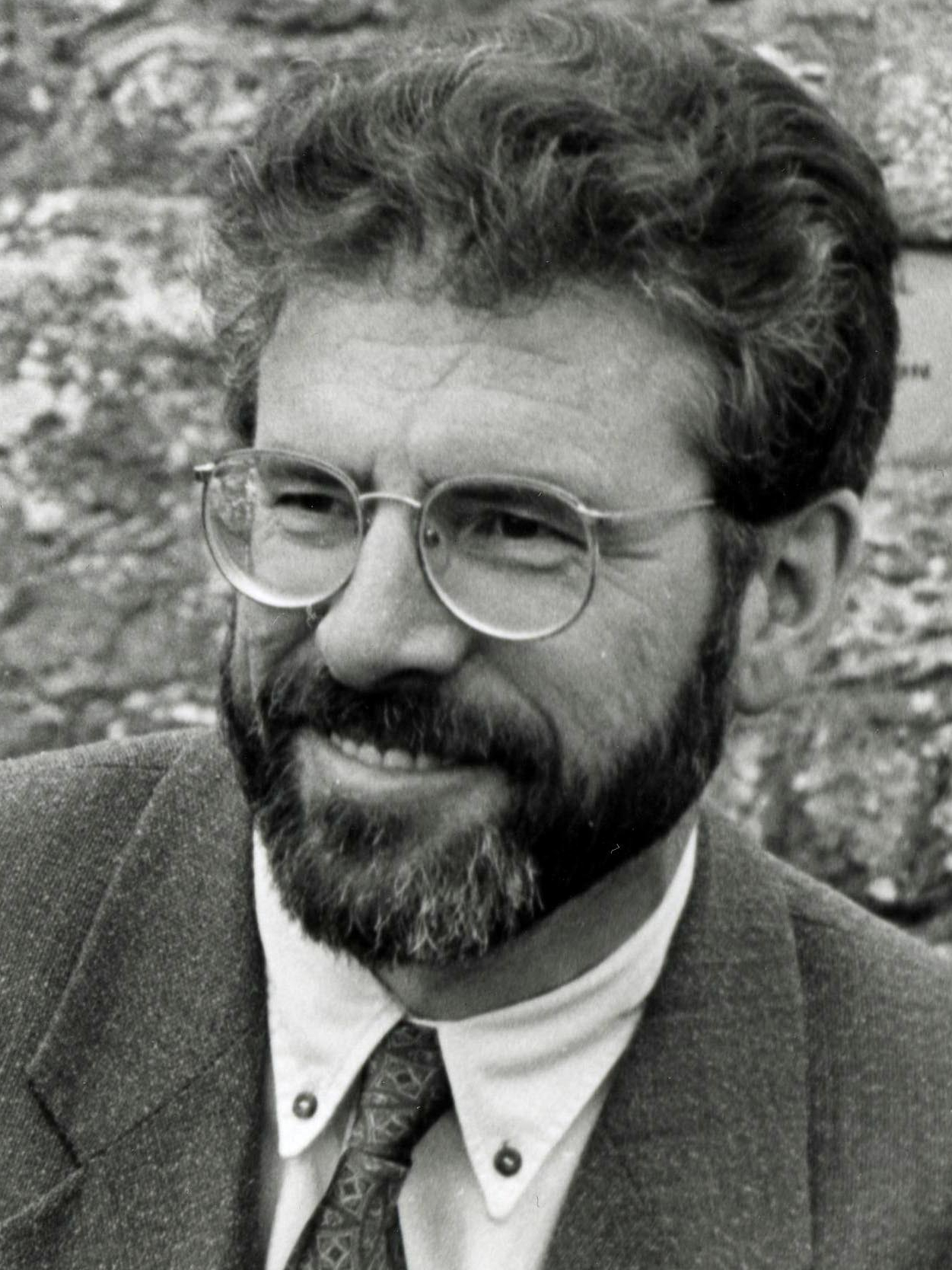

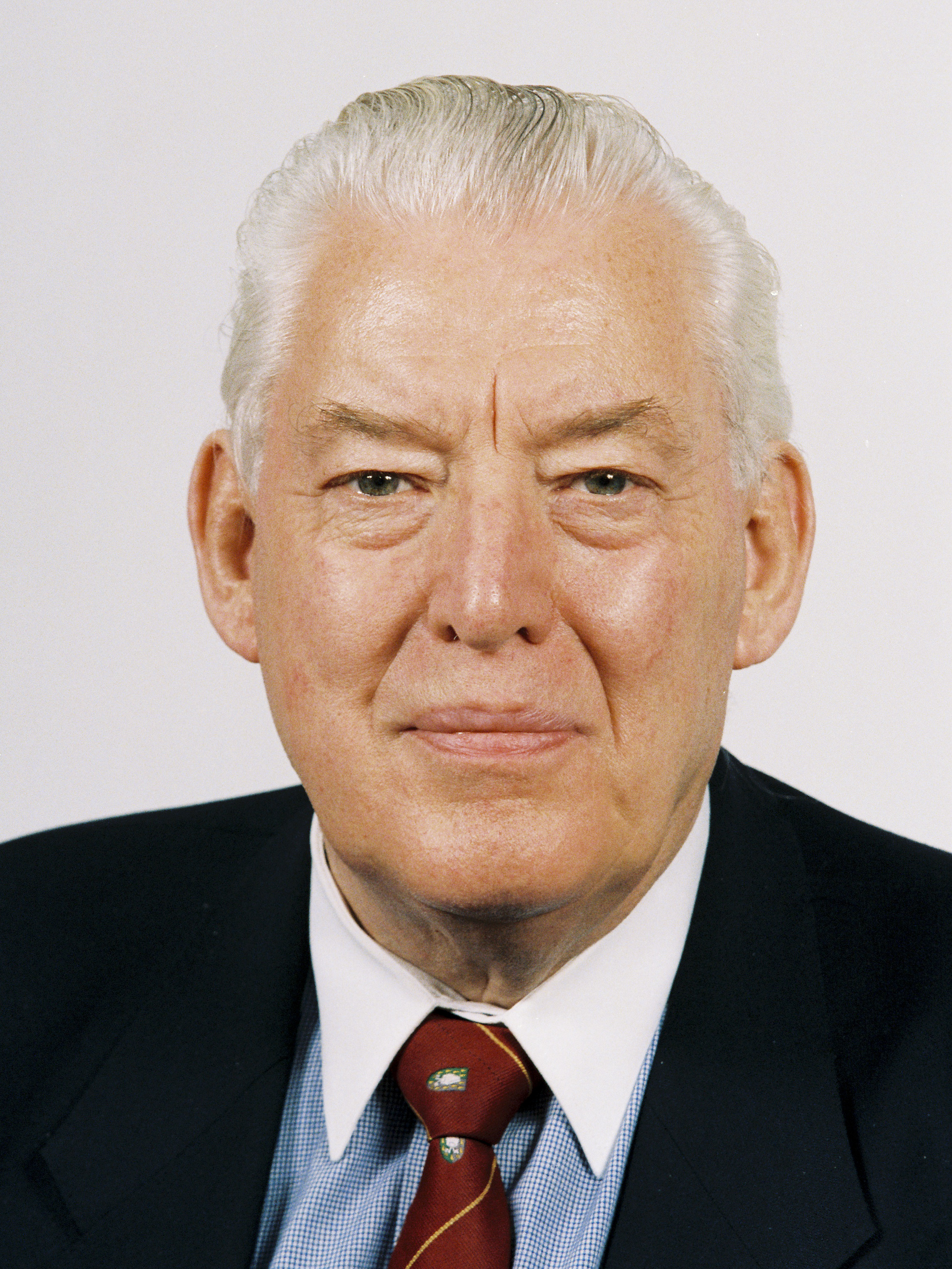
	First party	Second party	Third party
Leader	David Trimble	John Hume	Gerry Adams
Party	UUP	SDLP	Sinn Féin
Leader since	28 August 1995	6 May 1979	1983
Leader's seat	Upper Bann	Foyle	Ran in Belfast West (won)
Last election	9 seats, 34.5%	4 seats, 23.5%	0 seats, 10.0%
Seats before	9^{†}	4^{†}	0^{†}
Seats won	10	3	2
Seat change	▲1*	▼1*	▲2*
Popular vote	258,349	190,814	126,921
Percentage	32.7%	24.1%	16.1%
Swing	▼1.8 pp	▲0.6 pp	▲6.1 pp
	Fourth party	Fifth party
		UKUP
Leader	Ian Paisley	Robert McCartney
Party	DUP	UK Unionist
Leader since	30 September 1971	1995
Leader's seat	North Antrim	North Down
Last election	3 seats, 13.1%	Did not contest
Seats before	4^{†}	0^{†}
Seats won	2	1
Seat change	▼2*	▲1*
Popular vote	107,348	12,817
Percentage	13.6%	1.6%
Swing	▲0.5 pp	New party
- ^{†}Notional 1992 results if held on the 1997 boundaries *Indicates boundary change—so this is a notional figure.

On 1 May 1997, the 1997 United Kingdom general election was held in Northern Ireland, to elect all 659 members of the House of Commons, including the 18 Northern Ireland seats. This was an increase of one seat in Northern Ireland, where the House of Commons as a whole had increased from 650 to 659 seats.

1,177,969 people were eligible to vote, up 53,069 from the 1992 general election. 67.39% of eligible voters turned out (when including spoiled ballots), down 2.6 percentage points from the last general election.

The Labour Party led by Tony Blair won a large majority with 418 of 659 seats, returning to office after 18 years of Conservative Party government. In Northern Ireland, Sinn Féin gained two seats, beginning a steady growth in support in elections to the House of Commons.

Less than a year after this election, on 10 April 1998, the Good Friday Agreement was signed, providing for a Northern Ireland Assembly and devolved government through the Northern Ireland Executive.

== Electoral system ==
The Fourth periodic review of Westminster constituencies was conducted prior to the election, with the adoption of the review increasing the number of seats in Northern Ireland from the 17 seats used between 1983 to 1992, to 18 seats. As a result of the redistribution, the notional results meant that the seats sat as follows in 1992 on the 1997 borders: 9 Ulster Unionist Party seats; 4 Social Democratic and Labour Party seats; 4 Democratic Unionist Party seats; and 1 Ulster Popular Unionist Party seat.

The results in terms of seat changes, therefore, reflect the boundary changes as if these were the boundaries in 1992. As such, most seats were relatively unchanged, but with the DUP holding seats of a much smaller Mid Ulster and the newly-created West Tyrone which had been created from the splitting up of Mid Ulster.

== Candidates ==
Below is a table summarising the candidates of the 1997 general election in Northern Ireland.

Affiliation	Candidates
Social Democratic and Labour Party	18
Natural Law Party	18
Alliance Party of Northern Ireland	17
Sinn Féin	17
Ulster Unionist Party	16
Democratic Unionist Party	9
Northern Ireland Conservatives	8
Workers' Party	8
Independent	4 (Note: The candidates that stood were Lindsay Mason in East Antrim, Derek Dougan in Belfast East, Liam Kennedy in Belfast West and Robert Mooney in North Down.)
Progressive Unionist Party	3 (Note: The candidates that stood were Billy Donaldson in East Antrim, Hugh Smyth in South Antrim and David Ervine in Belfast South.)
Northern Ireland Women's Coalition	3 (Note: The candidates that stood were Bronagh Hinds in North Antrim, Annie Campbell in Belfast South and Jane Morrice in North Down.)
UK Unionist Party	1 (Note: Candidate Robert McCartney stood in North Down.)
Green Party of Northern Ireland	1 (Note: Candidate Peter Emerson stood in Belfast North.)
Independent Labour	1 (Note: Candidate Niall Cusack stood in Belfast South.)
National Democrats	1 (Note: Candidate Ian Anderson stood in East Londonderry.)
Total	125

== Outcome ==
The Ulster Unionist Party held its seats of East Antrim, South Antrim, Belfast North, Belfast South, Fermanagh and South Tyrone, Lagan Valley, Strangford and Upper Bann, and gained 1 seat from the DUP. The Democratic Unionist Party under the leadership of Ian Paisley held its seats of Belfast East and North Antrim over from the previous election, with the seats being relatively unaffected by the redistribution. However, out of its 'held' seats for the last election under the new boundaries, lost the new seat of West Tyrone to the Ulster Unionists, and the altered seat of Mid Ulster to Sinn Féin. In North Down, following the death of Ulster Popular Unionist Party MP James Kilfedder, his seat was instead won by Robert McCartney of the UK Unionist Party at the 1995 North Down by-election. His retention of the seat at this election represented a gain from the UPUP.

The Social Democratic and Labour Party under leader John Hume held its seats of South Down, Foyle and Newry and Armagh, but lost Belfast West to Sinn Féin. Sinn Féin itself won Belfast West, with leader Gerry Adams taking the seat, along with its second win in Mid Ulster.

== Results summary ==
Party	Seats					Aggregate votes		
Party	Total	Gains	Losses	Net	Of all (%)	Total	Of all (%)	Change (%)
UUP	10	1	0	▲1	55.6	258,349	32.7	▼1.8
SDLP	3	0	1	▼1	16.7	190,814	24.1	▲0.6
Sinn Féin	2	2	0	▲2	11.1	126,921	16.1	▲6.1
DUP	2	0	2	▼2	11.1	107,348	13.6	▲0.5
Alliance	0	0	0	Steady	—	62,972	8.0	▼0.7
UK Unionist	1	New		▲1	5.6	12,817	1.6	New
PUP	0	New			—	10,934	1.4	New
NI Conservatives	0	0	0	Steady	—	9,858	1.2	▼4.5
NI Women's Coalition	0	New			—	3,024	0.4	New
Workers' Party	0	0	0	Steady	—	2,766	0.3	▼0.3
Natural Law	0	0	0	Steady	—	2,210	0.3	Steady
Independent	0	0	0	Steady	—	1,845	0.2	▼0.1
Green (NI)	0	Did not stand in 1992			—	539	0.1	—N/a
Independent Labour	0	Did not stand in 1992			—	292	0.0	—N/a
National Democrats	0	New			—	81	0.0	New
Other non-contested	0	—N/a		▼1 (Note: 1 Ulster Popular Unionist Party seat in North Down.)	—	0	0.0	—N/a
Blank and invalid votes						3,120	—	—
Total	18			0	100.0	790,762 (Note: All valid votes excluding spoiled votes.)	100.0	0.0
Registered voters, and turnout						1,177,969	67.1	▼2.7

Popular vote
UUP	32.7%
SDLP	24.1%
Sinn Féin	16.1%
DUP	13.6%
APNI	8.0%
UKUP	1.6%
PUP	1.4%
NI Conservative	1.2%
Women's Coalition	0.4%
Other	0.9%

Parliamentary seats
UUP	55.6%
SDLP	16.7%
Sinn Féin	11.1%
DUP	11.1%
UKUP	5.6%

== MPs elected ==
Constituency	Party	MP
East Antrim	UUP	Roy Beggs
North Antrim	DUP	Ian Paisley
South Antrim	UUP	Clifford Forsythe
Belfast East	DUP	Peter Robinson
Belfast North	UUP	Cecil Walker
Belfast South	UUP	Martin Smyth
Belfast West	Sinn Féin	Gerry Adams
North Down	UK Unionist	Robert McCartney
South Down	SDLP	Eddie McGrady
Fermanagh and South Tyrone	UUP	Ken Maginnis
Foyle	SDLP	John Hume
Lagan Valley	UUP	Jeffrey Donaldson
East Londonderry	UUP	William Ross
Mid Ulster	Sinn Féin	Martin McGuinness
Newry and Armagh	SDLP	Seamus Mallon
Strangford	UUP	John Taylor
West Tyrone	UUP	William Thompson
Upper Bann	UUP	David Trimble

=== By-elections ===
Constituency	Date	Incumbent	Party	Winner	Party	Cause
South Antrim	21 September 2000	Clifford Forsythe	UUP	William McCrea	DUP	Death

== See also ==
- 1997 United Kingdom general election in England
- 1997 United Kingdom general election in Scotland
- 1997 United Kingdom general election in Wales
