= 1997 Boise mayoral election =

- November 4, 1997
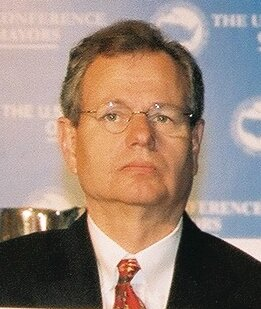

| Candidate | Brent Coles | Matthew Shapiro |
| Party | Nonpartisan | Nonpartisan |
| Popular vote | 14,879 | 6,475 |
| Percentage | 69.68% | 30.32% |
Mayor before election
Brent Coles
Nonpartisan
Elected mayor
Brent Coles
Nonpartisan

The 1997 Boise mayoral election was held on November 4, 1997. Incumbent Mayor Brent Coles ran for re-election to a second term. No well-known candidates challenged Coles for re-election, and his only opponent was activist and public policy researcher Matthew Shapiro.

Coles ultimately won re-election in a landslide, receiving 70 percent of the vote to Shapiro's 30 percent.

== General election ==
=== Candidates ===
- Brent Coles, incumbent Mayor
- Matthew Shapiro, neighborhood organizer, public policy researcher

==== Results ====
1997 Boise mayoral election
| Party | Candidate | Votes | % |
|---|---|---|---|
| Nonpartisan | Brent Coles (inc.) | 14,879 | 69.68% |
| Nonpartisan | Matthew Shapiro | 6,475 | 30.32% |
| Total votes | | 21,354 | 100.00% |
