= 1997 Micronesian general election =

1997 Micronesian parliamentary election
- 4 March 1997

10 out of 14 seats in Congress

Parliamentary elections were held in the Federated States of Micronesia on 4 March 1997, alongside a referendum on tax revenues. All candidates for seats in Congress ran as independents.

The referendum proposed modifying Chapter 5, Article IX of the constitution:

National taxes shall be imposed uniformly. Not less than 50% of the revenue shall be paid into the treasury of the state where collected.

to increase the amount of tax revenue returned to the states from 50% to 80%. In order to pass, the change required the approval of at least 75% of voters in three of the four states. Although it was approved by a majority in two states and in terms of the total number of votes, the 75% approval threshold was not passed in any of the four states.

== Results ==
=== Congress ===
Party	Votes	%	Seats
Independents		100	14
Invalid/blank votes		–	–
Total	33,000	100	14
Source: IPU

=== Referendum ===
Choice	Votes	%	States
For	16,026	52.95	0
Against	14,242	47.05	4
Invalid/blank votes		–	–
Total	30,268	100	4
Source: Direct Democracy

==== By state ====
State	For		Against		Total votes
State	Votes	%	Votes	%	Total votes
Chuuk	10,143	70.29	4,287	29.71	14,430
Kosrae	380	24.31	1,183	75.69	1,563
Pohnpei	4,212	35.74	7,573	64.26	11,785
Yap	1,291	51.85	1,199	48.15	2,490
Source: Direct Democracy
