= Gene Zmuda =

Gene A. Zmuda (born 1958) is an American jurist and politician. A self-described "urban" Republican, he has been influential in Toledo-area politics for over a decade. He is served on the Lucas County Common Pleas Court, with a term ending January 3, 2011. He was elected to preside over the Ohio Sixth District Court in November 2018.

== Life and career ==
Born and raised in Toledo, Ohio, Zmuda attended St. Francis de Sales High School before going on to receive his bachelor's and law degrees from the University of Toledo. He practiced law for several years before deciding to go into politics, at which time he considered running for the Ohio General Assembly, but was convinced to run for Toledo City Council. During his tenure on City Council, he was frequently at odds with Toledo's outspoken Democratic mayor, Carty Finkbeiner. Most notably, after a dispute over an eminent domain issue, Mayor Finkbeiner referred to him as "a demagogue and obstructionist of the highest order".

Zmuda remained on City Council until Governor Bob Taft appointed him to a vacant seat on the Toledo Municipal Court in 2003. His peers on the court elected him the presiding Judge, and he remained at that post until the election of Tom Osowik to an appellate court created a vacancy on the Lucas County Common Pleas Court. Taft then appointed Zmuda to fill this seat.

The tenure of Municipal Court Judge Zmuda is perhaps best known for his striking down of a law banning the transportation of alcohol into Ohio from other states. Judge Zmuda opined that the application of the law was unconstitutional because it violated the interstate commerce clause of the United States Constitution. This was effectively seen as a victory for local college students who had made a habit of bringing beer kegs over the nearby Michigan border.

In 2006, Zmuda was elected board President of the newly formed University of Toledo Honors Alumni Affiliate.
