= Bronagh Hinds =

Founder of DemocraShe

Bronagh Anne Hinds CBE (born 27 July 1951) is a women's rights advocate from Northern Ireland. She was a participant in the Good Friday Agreement negotiations for the Women's Coalition and was the Deputy Chief Commissioner of the Equality Commission for Northern Ireland.

== Early life ==
Bronagh Hinds was born on 27 July 1951 and grew up in Belfast. Hinds enrolled as a law student at Queen's University Belfast, where she later became the first woman to be elected as President of an Irish university student's union at 22 years old. Whilst a student, she attended the march that would later be dubbed Bloody Sunday. During her time at Queen's, she campaigned for an increase in student grants and women's representation.

== Career ==
In 1975, Hinds co-founded the Northern Ireland Women's Rights Movement (NIWRM). Her focus at NIWRM was to ensure access to quality childcare. She was the Northern Irish Information Officer in the Northern Ireland Citizen's Advice Bureaux. She later moved to Dublin in 1977 as the Information Coordinator for Combat Poverty.

She later returned to Belfast to serve as Secretary to the Northern Ireland Consumer Council before leading one-parent family organization Gingerbread, North Ireland from 1981 to 1991. In 1989, Hinds helped establish the Northern Ireland Women's European Platform. Hinds then served as the Northern Ireland Director of Oxfam from 1990 to 1992 and then as the Director of the Ulster People's College from 1993 to 2001.

In the early stages of the Good Friday talks, Hinds successfully worked with Monica McWilliams and Avila Kilmurray to lobby for women's participation in the peace talks and formed the Northern Ireland Women's Coalition because they "noticed that there was going to be very few female voices around the table that was negotiating the future landscape for Northern Ireland. I think there was a recognition that more female voices could bring new perspectives and a positive dynamic."

In 2000, Bronagh Hinds founded DemocraShe in order to promote the advancement of women in political and public life by training women in election confidence, public speaking and campaign building

From 1999 to 2003, Hinds also served as the Deputy Chief Commissioner of the Equality Commission for Northern Ireland.

== Awards and honors ==
In 1999, Hinds won a UK Woman of Europe award for her work on the Good Friday Agreement.

In 2021, Hinds won an honorary doctorate from Queen's University Belfast, to acknowledge her contribution to peacebulding and the community.
