= 1997 Albuquerque mayoral election =

- October 7, 1997
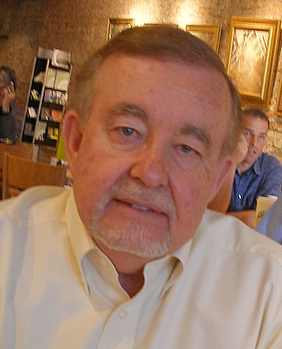

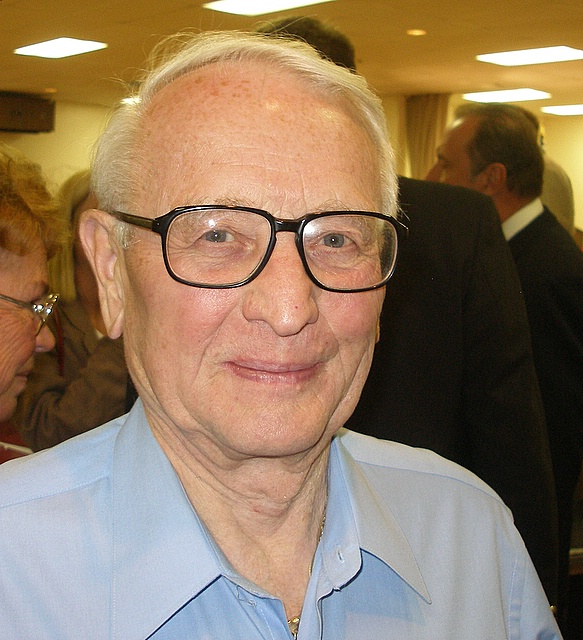

Nominee	Jim Baca	Vickie S. Perea
Party	Nonpartisan	Nonpartisan
Popular vote	21,588	18,434
Percentage	28.64%	24.45%
Nominee	David Cargo	Sam Bregman
Party	Nonpartisan	Nonpartisan
Popular vote	17,036	12,111
Percentage	22.60%	16.07%
Mayor before election
Martin Chávez
Democratic
Elected mayor
Jim Baca
Democratic

The 1997 Albuquerque mayoral election was held on October 7, 1997, in order to elect the Mayor of Albuquerque. Former Director of the Bureau of Land Management Jim Baca won the election against his foremost opponent and fellow Nonpartisan candidate Vickie S. Perea.

== General Election ==
The general election was held on October 7, 1997. Jim Baca was elected by a margin of 3,154 votes against his foremost opponent and fellow Nonpartisan candidate Vickie S. Perea, thereby retaining Democratic control over the office of Mayor of Albuquerque, New Mexico.

=== Results ===
Albuquerque mayoral election, 1997
Party	Candidate	Votes	%
Nonpartisanism	Jim Baca	21,588	28.64
Nonpartisanism	Vickie S. Perea	18,434	24.45
Nonpartisanism	David Cargo	17,036	22.60
Nonpartisanism	Sam Bregman	12,111	16.07
Nonpartisanism	Joe C. Diaz	3,316	4.40
Nonpartisanism	Carlton Pennington	1,447	1.92
Nonpartisanism	David Kirk Anderson	1,394	1.85
Nonpartisanism	Keith Russell Judd (Withdrawn)	61	0.08
Scattering		1	0.00
Total votes		75,388	100.00
Democratic hold			
