= 1997 Raleigh mayoral election =

Raleigh mayoral election, 1997
- October 7, 1997
Candidate	Tom Fetzer	Venita Peyton
Party	Republican	Democratic
Popular vote	23,700	18,693
Percentage	55.65%	40.48%
Mayor before election
Tom Fetzer
Republican
Elected mayor
Tom Fetzer
Republican

The Raleigh mayoral election of 1997 was held on October 7, 1997, to elect a Mayor of Raleigh, North Carolina. The election was non-partisan. It was won by Tom Fetzer, who stayed incumbent after beating Venita Peyton.

== Results ==
1997 Raleigh mayoral election
Candidate	Votes	%
Tom Fetzer (incumbent)	18,693	55.65
Venita Peyton	13,597	40.48
Robinson	385	0.01
Sessoms III	380	0.01
Stewart	318	0.01
Winterbottom	170	0.01
Write-ins	49	0.00
Turnout	33,592	%
