= 1997 Winston-Salem mayoral election =

Winston-Salem mayoral election, 1997
- November 7, 1997
Nominee	Jack Cavanagh	Martha Wood
Party	Republican	Democratic
Popular vote	18,763	14,444
Percentage	56.3%	43.3%
Mayor before election
Martha Wood
Democratic
Elected mayor
Jack Cavanagh
Republican

The 1997 Winston-Salem mayoral election was held on November 7, 1997, to elect the mayor of Winston-Salem, North Carolina. It saw the election of Jack Canvanagh, who defeated incumbent mayor Martha Wood.

This was the last time a Republican, or anyone other than Allen Joines won the mayorship of Winston Salem

== Primaries ==
The date of the primaries was September 26, 1997.

=== Democratic primary ===
Democratic primary results
Party	Candidate	Votes	%
Democratic	Martha Wood (incumbent)	6,400	75.73
Democratic	Joseph A. Alexander	1,049	12.41
Democratic	Mark A. Thomas	670	7.93
Democratic	Richard Lambert Newton	332	3.93
Total votes		8,451	

=== Republican primary ===
Republican primary results
Party	Candidate	Votes	%
Republican	Jack Cavanagh, Jr.	3,452	94.47
Republican	Alfred Abdo, Jr.	202	5.53
Total votes		3,654	

== General election ==
General election results
Party	Candidate	Votes	%
Republican	Jack Cavanagh, Jr.	18,763	56.28
Democratic	Martha S. Wood (incumbent)	14,444	43.32
Write-In	Write-ins	133	0.40
Total votes		33,340	
