= 1997 San Marino local elections =

Mayoral election; won by Italo Righi

The 1997 San Marino local elections were held on 14 December to elect the mayor and the council of Montegiardino in San Marino. Turnout was 81.8%.

== Electoral system ==
Voters elected the mayor (Italian: capitano di castello) and the municipal council (giunta di castello). The number of seats was established by law at eight members. Candidates ran on lists led by a mayoral candidate. Voters elected a list and were allowed to give up to two preferential votes. Seats were allocated with the d'Hondt method if the winner had obtained at least 60% of the votes. Otherwise, five seats would have been allocated to the winning party and the rest of the seats would have been allocated using the d'Hondt method to the rest of the parties. The winning list mayoral candidate was proclaimed mayor.

== Results ==
=== Montegiardino ===
List	Mayoral candidate	Votes	%	Seats
List A	Italo Righi	300	77.32	6
List B	Iader Tosi	88	22.68	2
Total		388	100.00	8
Valid votes		388	97.24	
Invalid/blank votes		11	2.76	
Total votes		399	100.00	
Registered voters/turnout		488	81.76	
