= 1997 Cleveland mayoral election =

- November 4, 1997
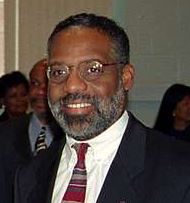

Candidate	Michael R. White	Helen Knipe Smith
Party	Nonpartisan	Nonpartisan
Popular vote	67,607	43,393
Percentage	60.90%	39.09%
Mayor before election
Michael R. White
Democratic
Elected mayor
Michael R. White
Democratic

The 1997 Cleveland mayoral election took place on November 4, 1997, to elect the Mayor of Cleveland, Ohio. Incumbent mayor Michael R. White was reelected to a third consecutive term, defeating city councilwoman Helen Knipe Smith.

The election was officially nonpartisan. Since only two candidates ran, no primary was required to be held. Both candidates were Democrats.

== Candidates ==
- Helen Knipe Smith, Cleveland city councilwoman
- Michael R. White, incumbent mayor

== Results ==
Cleveland mayoral election, 1993
Candidate	Votes	%
Michael R. White (incumbent)	67,607	60.90%
Helen Knipe Smith	43,393	39.09%
Write-ins	9	0.01%
Total votes	111,009	100
