= 1988 Social and Liberal Democrats leadership election =

Election in the United Kingdom

1988 Social & Liberal Democrats leadership election
- 28 July 1988
- Turnout: 72.1%
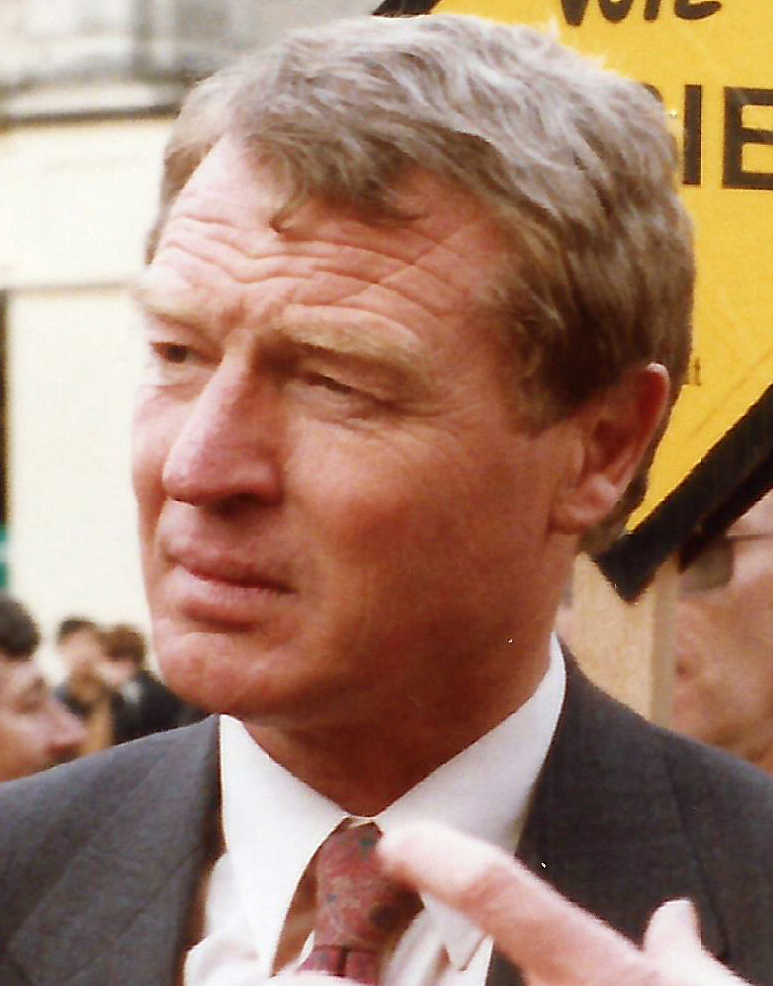

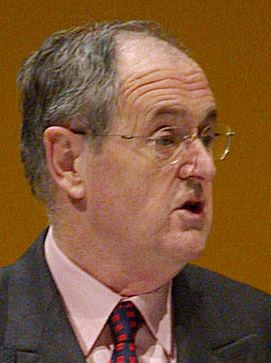
Candidate	Paddy Ashdown	Alan Beith
First pref.	41,401	16,202
Percentage	71.9%	28.1%
Leader before election
David Steel & Bob Maclennan
Elected Leader
Paddy Ashdown

The 1988 Social and Liberal Democrats leadership election was called following the formation of the then Social and Liberal Democrats (later changing their name to Liberal Democrats). It was intended to replace the two interim leaders, David Steel and Robert Maclennan, with a single figurehead better able to represent both the former members of the Liberal Party and of the Social Democratic Party.

There were two candidates and all members of the party were balloted using the Alternative Vote preference system. The election was won by Paddy Ashdown, who served as leader until his stepping down in 1999. The campaign occurred in a party which was still coping with the merger and saw a vituperative attack on Ashdown in a letter written by Alex Carlile, a Beith-supporting MP.

== Candidates ==
At the close of nominations on the 24 June 1988, the following had been successfully nominated.

=== Paddy Ashdown ===
Supporters included:

- MPs: Malcolm Bruce, Archy Kirkwood, Charles Kennedy Matthew Taylor, Richard Livsey, Ronnie Fearn, Menzies Campbell. Leading SDP supporters included Tom McNally (formerly James Callaghan's speechwriter), Lindsay Granshaw, Anne Sofer, Denis Sullivan, David Marquand, Roy Jenkins, Shirley Williams
- Other notable supporters: Timothy Clement-Jones (Past Chair of the Liberal Party), Des Wilson (Campaigner for Social Justice), Alan Leaman (Co-author of the Youth Charter)

=== Alan Beith ===
Supporters included:

- MPs: Geraint Howells, Cyril Smith, Alex Carlile, David Alton
- Lords: Lord Mackie
- Other notable supporters: Richard Wainwright (former Liberal MP), Annette Penhaligon (Widow of David Penhaligon MP and influential figure in the Liberal Party), Andrew Gifford (David Steel's Head of Office), Rev. Roger Roberts (Influential Welsh Liberal)

== Results ==
Paddy Ashdown was elected with the 71.9% of the vote excluding abstentions, a margin of victory that has not been exceeded in any subsequent contested leadership election.

Candidate	Votes	%
Paddy Ashdown ✓	41,401	71.6
Alan Beith	16,202	28.0
Abstention	187	0.3
Turnout	57,790	72.1
