= Torbay Council elections =

Local government elections in Devon, England

Torbay Council is the local authority for the unitary authority of Torbay in Devon, England. Until 1 April 1998 it was a non-metropolitan district. From 2005 to 2019 it had a directly elected mayor. The council is elected every four years.

== Election results ==
Composition of the council
Year	Conservative	Liberal Democrats (Note: Includes totals for the predecessors of the Liberal Democrats, the Liberal Party and SDP (both of which participated in the Alliance).)	Labour	Independents & Others	Council control after election
Local government reorganisation; council established (36 seats)
1973	30	0	6	0	Conservative
1976	34	0	0	2	Conservative
1979	27	3	0	6	Conservative
New ward boundaries (36 seats)
1983	34	0	0	2	Conservative
1984	29	4	0	3	Conservative
1986	28	7	0	1	Conservative
1987	25	10	0	1	Conservative
1988	26	8	0	2	Conservative
1990	17	12	3	4	No overall control
1991	12	21	2	1	Liberal Democrats
1995	5	28	3	0	Liberal Democrats
Torbay becomes a unitary authority (36 seats)
1997	11	23	2	0	Liberal Democrats
2000	31	5	0	0	Conservative
New ward boundaries (36 seats)
2003	9	27	0	0	Liberal Democrats
2007	25	10	0	1	Conservative
2011	22	9	1	4 (Note: 3 Independents, 1 UKIP)	Conservative
2015	25	7	0	4	Conservative
New ward boundaries (36 seats)
2019	15	13	0	8	No overall control
2023	19	15	0	2	Conservative

== Mayoral elections ==
A referendum took place on 14 July 2005 on establishing a directly elected mayor. The result saw a majority in favour with 18,074 in support and 14,684 opposed on a 32.1% turnout.

- 2005 Torbay Council mayoral election
- 2011 Torbay Council mayoral election
- 2015 Torbay Council mayoral election

A referendum took place on 5 May 2016 on reverting to a leader and cabinet system. The result saw a majority in favour of a leader and cabinet system with 15,846 votes in support of the leader and cabinet system and 9,511 wanting to stick with an elected mayor, on a 25.3% turnout.

== Borough result maps ==
2003 results map

2007 results map

2011 results map

2015 results map

2019 results map

2023 results map

== By-election results ==
=== 1997–2000 ===
Tormohun By-Election 15 January 1998
Party	Candidate	Votes	%	±%
Conservative		1,380	46.3	+10.9
Liberal Democrats		884	29.7	−2.4
Independent		521	17.5	−3.5
Labour		195	6.5	−5.0
Majority		469	16.6	
Turnout		2,980	35.0	
Conservative gain from Liberal Democrats		Swing		

Tormohun By-Election 17 September 1998
Party	Candidate	Votes	%	±%
Conservative	Damian Barton	671	38.2	+5.9
Liberal Democrats	Jennifer Faulkner	667	38.0	−5.3
Labour	Darren Cowell	321	18.3	−6.1
Liberal		97	5.5	+5.5
Majority		4	0.2	
Turnout		1,756		
Conservative gain from Liberal Democrats		Swing		

Preston By-Election 8 April 1999
Party	Candidate	Votes	%	±%
Conservative		1,504	51.4	+16.0
Liberal Democrats		1,129	38.6	+6.5
Labour		295	10.1	−1.4
Majority		375	12.8	
Turnout		2,928	34.0	
Conservative gain from Liberal Democrats		Swing		

=== 2000–2003 ===
Ellacombe By-Election 7 December 2000
Party	Candidate	Votes	%	±%
Liberal Democrats	Andrew Blake	1,151	62.9	+32.9
Conservative	David Selley	546	29.8	−7.2
Labour	Pauline Digby	94	5.1	+0.0
Independent	Lionel Digby	40	2.2	+2.2
Majority		605	33.1	
Turnout		1,831	24.7	
Liberal Democrats gain from Conservative		Swing		

Tormohun By-Election 29 November 2001
Party	Candidate	Votes	%	±%
Liberal Democrats	Christopher Harris	1,201	63.4	−26.3
Conservative		557	29.6	−10.9
Labour		121	6.4	−5.6
Majority		644	33.8	
Turnout		1,879	25.5	
Liberal Democrats gain from Conservative		Swing		

=== 2003–2007 ===
Roundham with Hyde By-Election 20 May 2004
Party	Candidate	Votes	%	±%
Conservative	Joseph Carroll	498	29.3	−2.3
Liberal Democrats	Andrew Douglas-Dunbar	413	24.3	−24.7
Independent	Alan Hall	203	11.9	+4.6
Labour	David Pedrick-Friend	203	11.9	−0.1
UKIP	Mark Dent	128	7.5	+7.5
BNP	Michael Turner	106	6.2	+6.2
Independent	Pamela Neale	85	5.0	+5.0
Independent	Mary Bennett	63	3.7	+3.7
Majority		85	5.0	
Turnout		1,699	31.2	
Conservative gain from Liberal Democrats		Swing		

Wellswood By-Election 5 August 2004 (2)
Party	Candidate	Votes	%	±%
Conservative		964		
Conservative		923		
UKIP		545		
UKIP		482		
Liberal Democrats	Tristan Gruber	198		
Liberal Democrats	Thomas Pentney	192		
Labour		102		
Labour		89		
Turnout		3,496	27.6	
Conservative hold		Swing		

Goodrington with Roselands By-Election 21 October 2004
Party	Candidate	Votes	%	±%
Conservative	Colin Hurst	701	42.2	+10.5
Liberal Democrats	Thomas Pentney	510	30.7	−27.9
UKIP	Mark Dent	284	17.1	+7.4
Labour	John Mellor	116	7.0	+7.0
BNP	Michael Turner	50	3.0	+3.0
Majority		191	11.5	
Turnout		1,661	30.9	
Conservative gain from Liberal Democrats		Swing		

Wellswood By-Election 10 March 2005
Party	Candidate	Votes	%	±%
Conservative	John Hanley	1,261	62.5	+8.5
Liberal Democrats	Jefferson Rose	331	16.4	+5.2
UKIP	Mark Dent	326	16.1	−13.3
Labour	Thomas Millman	99	4.9	−0.6
Majority		930	46.1	
Turnout		2,017	29.6	
Conservative hold		Swing		

Blatchcombe By-Election 5 May 2005
Party	Candidate	Votes	%	±%
Conservative	Jeanette Richards	1,708	38.9	+18.9
Liberal Democrats	Alan Forbes	1,563	35.6	−14.1
Labour	Jonathan Haines	1,124	25.6	+7.4
Majority		145	3.3	
Turnout		4,395	57.8	
Conservative gain from Liberal Democrats		Swing		

Churston with Galmpton By-Election 8 December 2005
Party	Candidate	Votes	%	±%
Conservative	Derek Mills	1,250	77.7	+27.4
Liberal Democrats	Andrew Douglas-Dunbar	270	16.8	−32.9
Labour	Trevor Fine	89	5.5	+5.5
Majority		980	60.9	
Turnout		1,609	28.3	
Conservative hold		Swing		

=== 2007–2011 ===
Berryhead with Furzeham By-Election 14 June 2007 (3)
Party	Candidate	Votes	%	±%
Independent	Michael Morey	1,006		
Independent	Vic Ellery	952		
Conservative	Martyn Hodge	853		
Conservative	Simon Jones	727		
Conservative	Alan Craig	689		
Independent	Tony Walker	510		
Liberal Democrats	Chris Lomas	483		
Independent	Nigel James	397		
Liberal Democrats	Catherine Johns	277		
Liberal Democrats	John Turner	245		
BNP	Michael Turner	159		
BNP	Maureen Turner	152		
BNP	Chris Marchant	151		
UKIP	Gary Booth	145		
UKIP	Peter Fryett	129		
UKIP	Mike Simpson	93		
Labour	Patrick Canavan	71		
Labour	Jermaine Atiya-Alla	67		
Labour	Irene Reade	66		
Turnout		7,172	31.8	
Independent gain from Liberal Democrats		Swing		
Independent gain from Conservative		Swing		
Conservative hold		Swing		

St. Mary's-with-Summercombe By-Election 22 July 2010
Party	Candidate	Votes	%	±%
Liberal Democrats	Andrew Baldrey	801	52.7	
Conservative	Nicholas Henderson	365	24.0	
Labour	Rosemary Ann Clarke	195	12.8	
UKIP	Jen Walsh	159	10.5	
Majority				
Turnout		2,017	1,520	
Liberal Democrats gain from Conservative		Swing		

=== 2011–2015 ===
Cockington-with-Chelston By-Election 23 June 2011
Party	Candidate	Votes	%	±%
Liberal Democrats	Mark Pountney	1,048	46.3	
Conservative	Sylvia Faryna	614	27.1	
Labour	Leonora Critchlow	357	15.8	
Independent	Susie Colley	129	5.7	
Independent	Mark Dent	61	2.7	
Green	Thomas Cooper	55	2.4	
Majority				
Turnout		2,264	26.3	
Liberal Democrats gain from Conservative		Swing		

=== 2015–2019 ===
Clifton with Maidenway By-Election 5 November 2015
Party	Candidate	Votes	%	±%
Liberal Democrats	Adrian Sanders	1,096	69.2	+39.3
Conservative	Richard Barnby	234	14.8	−13.7
UKIP	Anthony Rayner	158	10.0	−9.7
Labour	Eddie Harris	53	3.3	−9
Green	Stephen Pocock	43	2.7	−6.8
Majority		862	54.4	+53
Turnout		1,584	27.6	
Liberal Democrats hold		Swing	+26.5	

Tormohun By-Election 5 May 2016
Party	Candidate	Votes	%	±%
Liberal Democrats	Nicholas Pentney	1,126	46.7	
Conservative	Jacqueline Wakeham	533	22.1	
Labour	Darren Cowell	344	14.3	
UKIP	Steven Walsh	315	13.1	
Green	Stephen Morley	66	2.7	
TUSC	Michelle Goodman	27	1.1	
Majority		593	24.6	
Turnout		2,411	29.8	
Liberal Democrats gain from Conservative		Swing		

Watcombe By-election 14 December 2017
Party	Candidate	Votes	%	±%
Liberal Democrats	Swithin Long	655	57.1	
Conservative	Daniel Maddock	355	30.9	
Labour	Julia Neal	121	9.5	
Green	Eleanor Taylor	17	1.4	
Majority		300	26.1	
Turnout		1,148	22.3	
Liberal Democrats hold		Swing		

=== 2019–2023 ===
Goodrington with Roselands By-Election 14 November 2019
Party	Candidate	Votes	%	±%
Conservative	Jane Barnby	892	49.3	+21.7
Liberal Democrats	Dennis Shearman	641	35.5	+4.8
Brexit Party	Eddie Davis	168	9.3	+9.3
Labour	Catherine Fritz	72	4.0	−2.3
Green	Jane Hughes	35	1.9	−7.5
Majority		251	13.9	
Turnout		1,808		
Conservative gain from Liberal Democrats		Swing		

Clifton with Maidenway By-Election 6 May 2021
Party	Candidate	Votes	%	±%
Liberal Democrats	Cat Johns	1,014	45.8	+4.7
Conservative	John Fellows	983	44.4	+17.6
Labour	Andy Symons	149	6.7	−0.8
Green	Sue Kenning	69	3.1	−9.7
Majority		31	1.4	
Turnout		2,215		
Liberal Democrats hold		Swing		

=== 2023–2027 ===
Aby-election was held in June 2024 following the death of independent councillor Patrick Joyce. The Conservatives won the seat, regaining majority control of the council. The change in percentages given below are given in comparison to the general results of the 2023 Torbay Council election.

Wellswood By-Election 6 June 2024
Party	Candidate	Votes	%	±%
Conservative	Hazel Foster	938	42.3	−1.8
Liberal Democrats	Peter Fenton	929	41.9	+5.3
Reform	Mike Lister	188	8.5	New
Labour	Jonathan Chant-Stevens	117	5.3	+3.3
Green	Jenny Giel	34	1.5	−6.7
Independent	Paul Moor	11	0.5	−8.0
Majority		9	0.4	
Turnout		2217	38.4%	−0.6
Conservative gain from Independent		Swing	▼3.55	
