= Confusing similarity =

Test used during trademark examination

In trademark law, confusing similarity is a test used during the examination process to determine whether a trademark conflicts with another, earlier mark, and also in trademark infringement proceedings to determine whether the use of a mark infringes a registered trademark.

In many jurisdictions this test has been superseded by the concepts of similarity and likelihood of confusion, due to the harmonizing effects of the Agreement on Trade-Related Aspects of Intellectual Property Rights.

== Infringement ==
Where mark X is not identical to a registered trademark, the use of mark X may still amount to an infringement if it is "confusingly similar" to the registered trademark. Mark X may share elements of spelling or style that would lead a reasonable observer to believe the trademarks were related.

For example, in the computer industry, Microsoft has become such a well known trade name and trade mark that other businesses in the industry may want to use the term "micro" or "soft" in their names. As Microsoft generally does not hold exclusive rights in these terms, it would need to establish that any trade names or trademarks which include these terms is confusingly similar to "Microsoft". The reputation attaching to a trademark is also significant, such that "Microsafe" or "Micro Software", although clearly not identical, could potentially be confusingly similar and amount to an infringement.

In addition, the style of a trade mark, such as a logo or font, can become relevant. For example, Microsoft products are distinguished in the marketplace by a consistent font. Competitors may not use the same font on their product, particularly when using a name which would not be confusingly similar except for the use of the font. For example, a brand called "Microsystems" would most likely not be confused with Microsoft. However if Microsystems used the same font as Microsoft, it would be confusingly similar. Some styles, like the script used on Coca-Cola products, are so well known that even a completely different name in a similar script could be held to be confusingly similar.

Cases of this type can be proven by using surveys which show that members of the public who are likely to use the services or goods protected by the trade mark have been confused by it. However, courts can also take judicial notice that an infringing mark is confusingly similar if it is obvious to even a casual observer.

Gambone (2024) argues that there is a need for proactive consumer confusion regulation in the United States because judges’ responses to disputes brought before them lag behind trends that cause consumer confusion.

Government agencies in some jurisdictions have used proactive regulation to prevent consumer confusion. In China, the China National Intellectual Property Administration will directly collect evidence of possible consumer confusion to proactively take regulatory action. For example, in response to possible infringement on the Quanjude trade mark, Chinese regulators took street level consumer surveys and reviewed delivery app comments before reaching a conclusion that food delivery service Yage broke confusing similarity rules.

== In election law ==
There are examples of electoral confusion caused by would-be candidates deliberately choosing similar names to confuse the electorate, hence potentially affecting the outcome of an election. For example, in three instances in the United Kingdom during 1994–5: a candidate attempting to stand as a member of the 'Literal Democrat' party (in the UK there is a Liberal Democrats Party), and two instances of candidates standing for the 'Conservatory' party and the 'Conversative' party (against the Conservative Party candidate). All candidatures were rejected by the Returning Officer and the candidates had to stand using more distinguishable party names.

In the 2019 Canadian Federal Election the satirical Rhinoceros Party ran a candidate by the name of Maxime Bernier in the riding of Beauce. The seat was also being contested by the incumbent MP and leader of the People's Party of Canada, Maxime Bernier.

== See also ==
- A moron in a hurry
- Apple Corps v. Apple Computer
- Microsoft vs. MikeRoweSoft
- Counteraction principle
- Richard Huggett
