= 2015 Torbay Council election =

2015 UK local government election

Map of results of 2015 election

The 2015 Torbay Council election took place on 7 May 2015 to elect members of Torbay Council in England. This was on the same day as other local elections, and the general election.

Torbay Council Election, 2015
| Party | Seats | Gains | Losses | Net gain/loss | Seats % | Votes % | Votes | +/− |
|---|---|---|---|---|---|---|---|---|
| Conservative | 25 | 3 | 0 | ▲3 | 69.445 | 36.19 | 47478 | -5.61 |
| Liberal Democrats | 7 | 0 | 2 | ▼2 | 19.445 | 24.83 | 32572 | -3.87 |
| Labour | 0 | 0 | 1 | ▼1 | 0 | 9.34 | 12254 | -0.06 |
| Green | 0 | 0 | 0 | Steady | 0 | 9.20 | 12066 | +1.9 |
| UKIP | 1 | 0 | 0 | Steady | 2.78 | 15.42 | 20225 | +13.62 |
| Independent | 3 | 0 | 0 | Steady | 8.33 | 5.02 | 6595 | -3.78 |

== Ward results ==
An asterisk * indicated an incumbent seeking re-election

=== Berry Head-with-Furzeham ===
Berry Head-with-Furzeham
| Party | Candidate | Votes | % | ±% |
|---|---|---|---|---|
| Independent | Jackie Stockman* | 1,930 | 40.8 | |
| Independent | Vic Ellery* | 1,690 | 35.7 | |
| Independent | Mike Morey* | 1,679 | 35.5 | |
| Conservative | Judith Mills | 1,483 | 31.3 | |
| Conservative | Adam Billings | 1,134 | 23.9 | |
| Green | Charlie Baker | 682 | 14.4 | |
| Green | Sassie Tickle | 532 | 11.2 | |
| Liberal Democrats | Michael Desmond | 322 | 6.8 | |
| Liberal Democrats | David Fordham | 296 | 6.3 | |
| Liberal Democrats | Eileen Fox | 288 | 6.1 | |
| Majority | | | | |
| Turnout | | 4,851 | 62.54 | +18.52 |
| Independent hold | | Swing | | |
| Independent hold | | Swing | | |
| Independent hold | | Swing | | |

=== Blatchcombe ===
Blatchcombe
| Party | Candidate | Votes | % | ±% |
|---|---|---|---|---|
| Conservative | David Thomas* | 1,659 | 36.8 | |
| Conservative | John Thomas* | 1,495 | 33.2 | |
| Conservative | Chris Robson | 1,406 | 31.2 | |
| UKIP | Steve Walsh | 1,300 | 28.8 | |
| Liberal Democrats | Sabrina Bradshaw | 799 | 17.7 | |
| Labour | Jane Macey | 795 | 17.6 | |
| Labour | Eddie Harris | 764 | 16.9 | |
| Labour | Jackie Colby | 754 | 16.7 | |
| Liberal Democrats | Naomi Milward | 615 | 13.6 | |
| Liberal Democrats | Ian Somerville | 605 | 13.4 | |
| Green | Neil Rolfe | 472 | 10.5 | |
| Green | Stephen Peacock | 426 | 9.4 | |
| Green | Ashley Cunningham | 411 | 9.1 | |
| Majority | | | | |
| Turnout | | 4,546 | 55.41 | +21.67 |
| Conservative hold | | Swing | | |
| Conservative hold | | Swing | | |
| Conservative hold | | Swing | | |

=== Churston Ferrers with Galmpton ===
Churston Ferrers-with-Galmpton
| Party | Candidate | Votes | % | ±% |
|---|---|---|---|---|
| Conservative | Derek Mills* | 1,726 | 42.6 | |
| Conservative | Di Stubley | 1,627 | 40.2 | |
| UKIP | Elizabeth Rayner | 965 | 23.8 | |
| Liberal Democrats | Dave Browne | 725 | 17.9 | |
| Labour | Bill Ingham | 588 | 14.5 | |
| Liberal Democrats | Thomas Pentney | 417 | 10.3 | |
| Green | Richard Spreckley | 396 | 9.8 | |
| Majority | | | | |
| Turnout | | 4,128 | 71.93 | +17.91 |
| Conservative hold | | Swing | | |
| Conservative hold | | Swing | | |

=== Clifton with Maidenway ===
Clifton-with-Maidenway
| Party | Candidate | Votes | % | ±% |
|---|---|---|---|---|
| Liberal Democrats | Ian Doggett* | 1,162 | 32.9 | |
| Liberal Democrats | Ruth Pentney* | 1,154 | 32.7 | |
| Conservative | Richard Barnby | 1,108 | 31.4 | |
| UKIP | Christine Dayment | 766 | 21.7 | |
| Conservative | Jackie Perrins | 740 | 20.9 | |
| Labour | Christina Vincent | 480 | 13.6 | |
| Green | Karen Cunningham | 370 | 10.5 | |
| Green | Matthew Rudland-Barfoot | 232 | 6.6 | |
| Majority | | | | |
| Turnout | | 3,590 | 62.63 | +20.9 |
| Liberal Democrats hold | | Swing | | |
| Liberal Democrats hold | | Swing | | |

=== Cockington-with-Chelston ===
Cockington-with-Chelston
| Party | Candidate | Votes | % | ±% |
|---|---|---|---|---|
| Conservative | Nicole Amil* | 2,048 | 35.5 | |
| Conservative | Mark King | 1,752 | 30.4 | |
| Conservative | Thomas Winfield | 1,664 | 28.9 | |
| Labour | Jack Critchlow | 1,426 | 24.7 | |
| Liberal Democrats | Jean Cope | 1,379 | 23.9 | |
| Liberal Democrats | Joanne Ledger | 1,094 | 19.0 | |
| UKIP | Mark Dent | 1,031 | 17.9 | |
| UKIP | Len Harvey | 998 | 17.3 | |
| Liberal Democrats | Fiona Hess | 918 | 15.9 | |
| UKIP | Merrick Rayner | 787 | 13.6 | |
| Green | Joanne McQuillan | 674 | 11.7 | |
| Green | Jimi Neary | 445 | 7.7 | |
| Majority | | | | |
| Turnout | | 5,836 | 65.90 | +32.08 |
| Conservative hold | | Swing | | |
| Conservative hold | | Swing | | |
| Conservative hold | | Swing | | |

=== Ellacombe ===
Ellacombe
| Party | Candidate | Votes | % | ±% |
|---|---|---|---|---|
| UKIP | Julien Parrott* | 929 | 32.4 | |
| Liberal Democrats | Cindy Stocks* | 774 | 27.0 | |
| Liberal Democrats | Paul Raybould | 594 | 20.7 | |
| Conservative | Beryl McPhail | 552 | 19.2 | |
| Labour | Suzannah Jones | 534 | 18.6 | |
| Conservative | Matthew Phillips | 533 | 18.6 | |
| UKIP | Jen Walsh | 513 | 17.9 | |
| Green | Hazel Robertson | 306 | 10.7 | |
| Majority | | | | |
| Turnout | | 2,918 | 52.88 | +19.06 |
| UKIP hold | | Swing | | |
| Liberal Democrats hold | | Swing | | |

=== Goodrington with Roselands ===
Goodrington-with-Roselands
| Party | Candidate | Votes | % | ±% |
|---|---|---|---|---|
| Conservative | Jane Barnby* | 1,325 | 35.0 | |
| Conservative | Alan Tyerman* | 1,035 | 27.3 | |
| Liberal Democrats | Sue Biles | 965 | 25.5 | |
| UKIP | Gary Booth | 908 | 24.0 | |
| Liberal Democrats | Robert O'Brien | 732 | 19.3 | |
| UKIP | Peter Fryett | 670 | 17.7 | |
| Labour | Rosalind Royle | 468 | 12.4 | |
| Green | Jane Mary Hughes | 265 | 7.0 | |
| Green | Ellie Knight-Rolfe | 203 | 5.4 | |
| Majority | | | | |
| Turnout | | 3,844 | 67.22 | +33.4 |
| Conservative hold | | Swing | | |
| Conservative hold | | Swing | | |

=== Preston ===
Preston
| Party | Candidate | Votes | % | ±% |
|---|---|---|---|---|
| Conservative | Chris Lewis* | 2,155 | 38.1 | |
| Conservative | Lynn Sykes | 2,023 | 35.8 | |
| Conservative | Anna Tolchard | 1,722 | 30.5 | |
| UKIP | Sue Powell | 1,419 | 25.1 | |
| Liberal Democrats | John Turner | 1,324 | 23.4 | |
| Liberal Democrats | Elliot Abercrombie | 1,296 | 22.9 | |
| Liberal Democrats | Linda Turner | 1,281 | 22.7 | |
| Labour | Stephen Turner | 758 | 13.4 | |
| Green | Ian Downer | 606 | 10.7 | |
| Green | Jules Kirkby | 603 | 10.7 | |
| Green | Andrew Robinson | 543 | 9.6 | |
| Majority | | | | |
| Turnout | | 5,755 | 68.82 | +23.36 |
| Conservative hold | | Swing | | |
| Conservative hold | | Swing | | |
| Conservative hold | | Swing | | |

=== Roundham with Hyde ===
Roundham-with-Hyde
| Party | Candidate | Votes | % | ±% |
|---|---|---|---|---|
| Conservative | Barbara Cunningham | 820 | 24.9 | |
| Liberal Democrats | Christine Carter | 685 | 20.8 | |
| Conservative | Simon Slade | 586 | 17.8 | |
| UKIP | Anthony Rayner | 575 | 17.5 | |
| UKIP | Eileen Harvey | 560 | 17.0 | |
| Liberal Democrats | Maggi Douglas-Dunbar | 494 | 15.0 | |
| Green | Paula Hermes | 468 | 14.2 | |
| Green | Sam Moss | 448 | 13.6 | |
| Labour | Irene Reade | 337 | 10.2 | |
| Independent | Bobbie Davies* | 330 | 10.0 | |
| Independent | Rick Heyse | 132 | 4.0 | |
| Majority | | | | |
| Turnout | | 3,350 | 54.73 | +16.58 |
| Conservative hold | | Swing | | |
| Liberal Democrats hold | | Swing | | |

Bobbie Davies was elected for this ward as a Liberal Democrat in 2011, and Rick Heyse stood in the seat as an English Radical in the same election.

=== Shiphay with The Willows ===
Shiphay-with-The Willows
| Party | Candidate | Votes | % | ±% |
|---|---|---|---|---|
| Conservative | Mark Kingscote* | 1,425 | 31.2 | |
| Conservative | Dave Morris | 1,405 | 30.7 | |
| Liberal Democrats | Colin Charlwood | 1,250 | 27.3 | |
| Liberal Democrats | Adam Carter | 969 | 21.2 | |
| UKIP | Tamsin Davies | 905 | 19.8 | |
| UKIP | Mary Bennett | 812 | 17.8 | |
| Labour | Arjun Mehta | 606 | 13.3 | |
| Green | Ellie Taylor | 366 | 8.0 | |
| Majority | | | | |
| Turnout | | 4,604 | 60.73 | +21.68 |
| Conservative hold | | Swing | | |
| Conservative hold | | Swing | | |

=== St Marychurch ===
St Marychurch
| Party | Candidate | Votes | % | ±% |
|---|---|---|---|---|
| Conservative | Neil Bent | 1,772 | 31.8 | |
| Conservative | Anne Brooks | 1,757 | 31.6 | |
| Conservative | Ray Hill* | 1,588 | 28.5 | |
| Liberal Democrats | David Ward | 1,541 | 27.7 | |
| Liberal Democrats | Steve Parr | 1,469 | 26.4 | |
| Liberal Democrats | Hamish Renton | 1,391 | 25.0 | |
| UKIP | Rie Greenwood | 1,075 | 19.3 | |
| UKIP | Ian Walsh | 971 | 17.5 | |
| Labour | John Coombs | 877 | 15.8 | |
| Green | Jenny Giel | 738 | 13.3 | |
| Majority | | | | |
| Turnout | | 5,665 | 62.91 | +21.59 |
| Conservative gain from Liberal Democrats | | Swing | | |
| Conservative hold | | Swing | | |
| Conservative hold | | Swing | | |

=== St Mary's-with-Summercombe ===
St. Mary's-with-Summercombe
| Party | Candidate | Votes | % | ±% |
|---|---|---|---|---|
| Conservative | Richard Haddock | 1,151 | 33.8 | |
| Conservative | Terry Manning* | 916 | 26.9 | |
| UKIP | Sue Davies | 736 | 21.6 | |
| UKIP | Mike Cuggy | 714 | 20.9 | |
| Labour | Rosemary Clark | 546 | 16.0 | |
| Labour | Philip Gregory | 450 | 13.2 | |
| Liberal Democrats | Steve Bryant | 400 | 11.7 | |
| Independent | Ian Carr | 345 | 10.1 | |
| Liberal Democrats | Hannah Stevens | 285 | 8.4 | |
| Green | John Fallon | 254 | 7.5 | |
| Green | Julian Gunther | 179 | 5.3 | |
| Majority | | | | |
| Turnout | | 3,491 | 58.17 | +16.53 |
| Conservative hold | | Swing | | |
| Conservative gain from Liberal Democrats | | Swing | | |

=== Tormohun ===
Tormohun
| Party | Candidate | Votes | % | ±% |
|---|---|---|---|---|
| Liberal Democrats | Mandy Darling | 1,304 | 27.9 | |
| Conservative | Robert Excell* | 1,289 | 27.6 | |
| Conservative | Andy Lang | 1,154 | 24.7 | |
| Conservative | Jackie Wakeman | 1,125 | 24.0 | |
| Liberal Democrats | Gill Hayman | 1,067 | 22.8 | |
| UKIP | Raymond Crump | 971 | 20.8 | |
| Labour | Darren Cowell | 944 | 20.2 | |
| Liberal Democrats | Robert Long | 933 | 19.9 | |
| UKIP | Neil Mead | 909 | 19.4 | |
| Labour | Lesley Discombe | 662 | 14.2 | |
| Green | Virginia Allum | 620 | 13.3 | |
| Labour | Julia Neal | 588 | 12.6 | |
| Green | Virginia Keyes | 511 | 10.9 | |
| Green | Stephen Morley | 416 | 8.9 | |
| Majority | | | | |
| Turnout | | 4,748 | 53.07 | +19.76 |
| Liberal Democrats hold | | Swing | | |
| Conservative hold | | Swing | | |
| Conservative gain from Labour | | Swing | | |

=== Watcombe ===
Watcombe
| Party | Candidate | Votes | % | ±% |
|---|---|---|---|---|
| Liberal Democrats | Steve Darling* | 1,383 | 43.9 | |
| Liberal Democrats | Roger Stringer* | 1,146 | 36.4 | |
| Conservative | Celia Brown | 746 | 23.7 | |
| Labour | Kevin Hughes | 612 | 19.4 | |
| Conservative | Dan Godfrey | 595 | 18.9 | |
| Labour | Jermaine Atiya-Alla | 365 | 11.6 | |
| UKIP | Rob Howard | 277 | 8.8 | |
| Green | Jenny Stoneman | 194 | 6.2 | |
| Majority | | | | |
| Turnout | | 3,196 | 59.19 | +17.83 |
| Liberal Democrats hold | | Swing | | |
| Liberal Democrats hold | | Swing | | |

=== Wellswood ===
Wellswood
| Party | Candidate | Votes | % | ±% |
|---|---|---|---|---|
| Conservative | Nick Bye | 2,157 | 48.3 | |
| Conservative | James O'Dwyer | 1,805 | 40.4 | |
| Liberal Democrats | Deborah Brewer | 934 | 20.9 | |
| UKIP | Chris Gibbings | 718 | 16.1 | |
| UKIP | Danny Harvey | 716 | 16.0 | |
| Liberal Democrats | Nick Pentney | 581 | 13.0 | |
| Independent | Fiona McPhail | 489 | 10.9 | |
| Green | Jessica Richards | 380 | 8.5 | |
| Green | Clive Richards | 326 | 7.3 | |
| Majority | | | | |
| Turnout | | 4,541 | 66.27 | +20.65 |
| Conservative hold | | Swing | | |
| Conservative hold | | Swing | | |

== By-elections 2015 to 2018 ==
=== Clifton with Maidenway ===
The by-election was held on 5 November 2015, following the death of Councillor Ruth Pentney.

Clifton-with-Maidenway
| Party | Candidate | Votes | % | ±% |
|---|---|---|---|---|
| Liberal Democrats | Adrian Sanders | 1,096 | 69.1 | +36.4 |
| Conservative | Richard Barnby | 235 | 14.8 | −16.6 |
| UKIP | Anthony Rayner | 158 | 10.0 | −11.7 |
| Labour | Eddie Harris | 53 | 3.3 | −10.2 |
| Green | Stephen Pocock | 43 | 2.7 | −7.8 |
| Majority | | 861 | 54.3 | |
| Turnout | | 1585 | 28.50 | −34.13 |
| Liberal Democrats hold | | Swing | | |

=== Tormohun ===
The by-election was called following the resignation of Councillor Andy Lang, and held on 5 May 2016.

Tormohun
| Party | Candidate | Votes | % | ±% |
|---|---|---|---|---|
| Liberal Democrats | Nicholas Pentney | 1,126 | 46.7 | +23.9 |
| Conservative | Jackie Wakeham | 533 | 22.1 | −2.6 |
| Labour | Darren Cowell | 344 | 14.3 | −5.9 |
| UKIP | Steven Walsh | 315 | 13.1 | −7.7 |
| Green | Stephen Morley | 66 | 2.7 | −6.2 |
| TUSC | Michelle Goodman | 27 | 1.1 | N/A |
| Majority | | 593 | 24.6 | |
| Turnout | | 2,422 | 29.76 | −23.31 |
| Liberal Democrats gain from Conservative | | Swing | | |

=== Watcombe ===
The by-election was called following the death of Councillor Roger Stringer. The by-election was held on 14 December 2017.

Watcombe
| Party | Candidate | Votes | % | ±% |
|---|---|---|---|---|
| Liberal Democrats | Swithin Long | 655 | 57.1 | +20.7 |
| Conservative | Daniel Maddock | 355 | 30.9 | +7.2 |
| Labour | Julia Neal | 121 | 10.5 | −8.9 |
| Green | Eleanor Taylor | 17 | 1.5 | −4.7 |
| Majority | | 300 | 26.1 | |
| Turnout | | 1,148 | 22.30 | −36.89 |
| Liberal Democrats hold | | Swing | | |
