= Devon and East Plymouth (European Parliament constituency) =

Former European Parliament constituency

- European Parliament constituency
- Boundary within South West England (1994-1999)
- Member state: United Kingdom
- Created: 1994
- Dissolved: 1999
- MEPs: 1

Devon and East Plymouth was a European Parliament constituency covering all of Devon in England, with the exception of the city of Plymouth. It was created in 1994 to replace the majority of Devon and a small part of Cornwall and Plymouth.

Prior to its uniform adoption of proportional representation in 1999, the United Kingdom used first-past-the-post for the European elections in England, Scotland and Wales. The European Parliament constituencies used under that system were smaller than the later regional constituencies and only had one Member of the European Parliament each.

The constituency consisted of the Westminster Parliament constituencies (on their 1983 boundaries) of Exeter, Plymouth Sutton, South Hams, Teignbridge, Tiverton, Torbay and Torridge and West Devon.

The seat became part of the much larger South West England constituency in 1999.

== Members of the European Parliament ==
Elected	Name	Party
1994	Giles Chichester	Conservative

== Results ==
Only one election was held in the seat, in 1994. When nominations closed, it was revealed that Richard Huggett was a candidate with the description "Literal Democrat", a name very similar to that of the Liberal Democrats. The latter launched legal action in the High Court of Justice alleging that the Returning Officer had wrongly accepted a nomination which was designed to confuse voters. The Judge ruled that the nomination had to stand. Huggett won more than 10,000 votes, while Liberal Democrat candidate Adrian Sanders finished only 700 votes behind the winner. This prompted a change in the law, banning potentially confusing party descriptions.

European Parliament election, 1994: Devon and East Plymouth
Party	Candidate	Votes	%	±%
Conservative	Giles Chichester	74,953	31.7	
Liberal Democrats	Adrian Sanders	74,253	31.4	
Labour	Linda Gilroy	47,596	20.1	
Liberal	David Morrish	14,621	6.2	
Green	Paul A. Edwards	11,172	4.7	
Literal Democrat	Richard Huggett	10,203	4.3	
Independent	John A. Everard	2,629	1.1	
Natural Law	Andrew J. Pringle	908	0.4	
Majority		700	0.3	
Turnout		236,335	45.1	
Conservative win (new seat)				
