= Generic trademark =

Trademark used for multiple brands

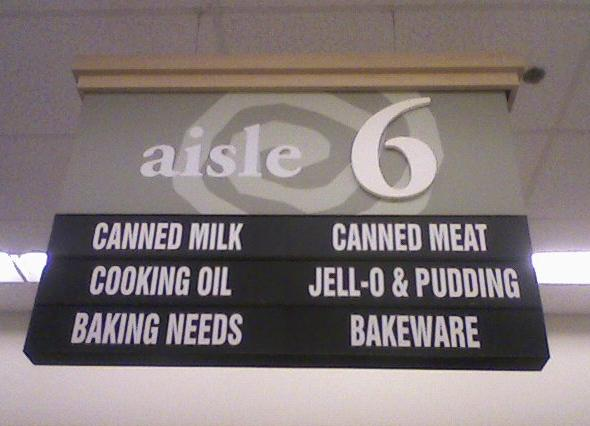
A sign in a Giant supermarket in Lancaster, Pennsylvania using "Jell-O" to refer to gelatin dessert in general

A generic trademark, also known as a genericized trademark or proprietary eponym, is a trademark or brand name that, because of its popularity or significance, has become the generic term for, or synonymous with, a general class of products, services, or actions, usually against the intentions of the trademark's owner.

A trademark is prone to genericization, or "genericide", when a brand name acquires substantial market dominance or mind share, becoming so widely used for similar products or services that it is no longer associated with the trademark owner, e.g., linoleum, bubble wrap, thermos, and aspirin. A trademark thus popularized is at risk of being challenged or revoked, unless the trademark owner works sufficiently to counter and prevent such broad use.

Trademark owners can inadvertently contribute to genericization by failing to provide an alternative generic name for their product or service or using the trademark in similar fashion to generic terms. In one example, the Otis Elevator Company's trademark of the word "escalator" was cancelled following a petition from Toledo-based Haughton Elevator Company. In rejecting an appeal from Otis, an examiner from the United States Patent and Trademark Office cited the company's own use of the term "escalator" alongside the generic term "elevator" in multiple advertisements without any trademark significance. Some trademark owners go to extensive lengths to avoid genericization and trademark erosion.

== In subpopulations ==
Genericization may be specific to certain professions and other subpopulations. For example, Luer-Lok (Luer lock), Phoroptor (phoropter), and Port-a-Cath (portacath) have genericized mind share among physicians due to a lack of alternative names in common use: as a result, consumers may not realize that the term is a brand name rather than a medical eponym or generic term. Similarly, a doctor may prescribe a specific brand of a now-generic drug, and the pharmacy may replace it with the generic (such as generic risperidone for Risperdal).

== In pharmaceuticals ==
Aspirin with and without trademark

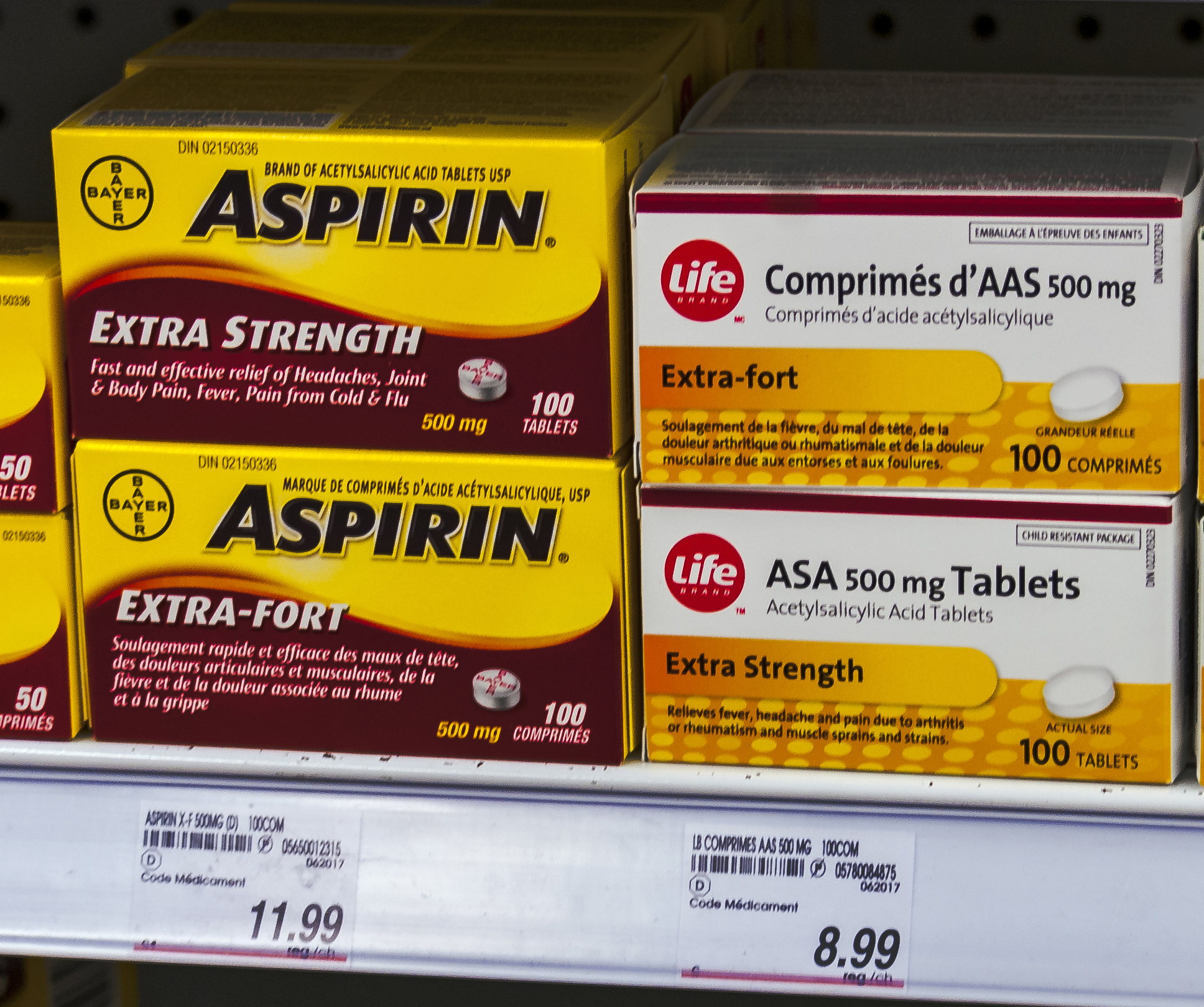
Bayer "Aspirin" for sale in Canada, next to a generic store equivalent described as "ASA" (acetylsalicylic acid) tablets, since the trademark is still recognized there

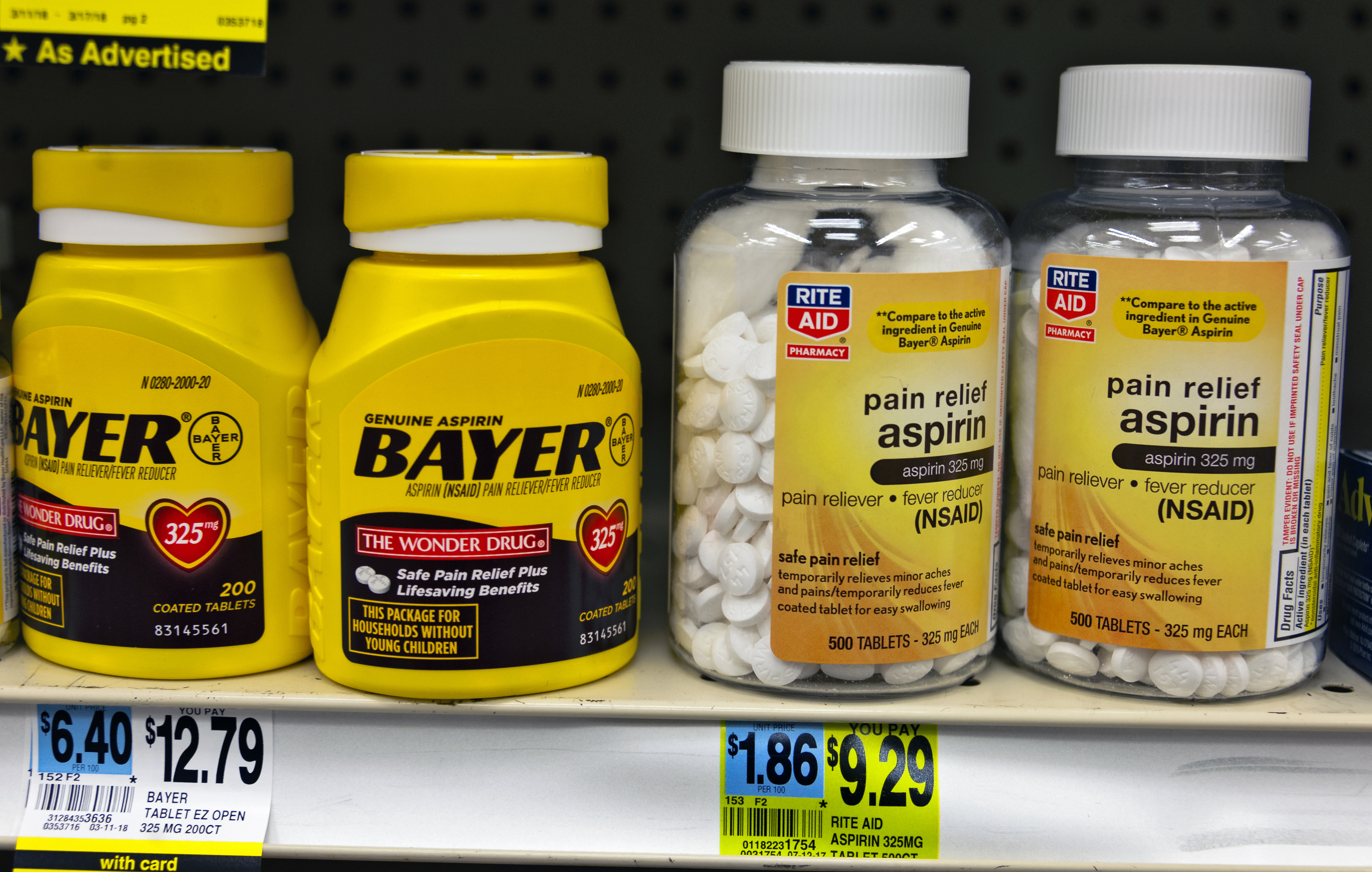
Aspirin for sale in the U.S., where the store brand can also be sold as "aspirin" since the trademark was ruled generic in 1921, and the Bayer-brand label instead emphasizes the word "Bayer"

Pharmaceutical trade names are somewhat protected from genericization due to the modern practice of assigning nonproprietary names based on a drug's chemical structure. This circumvents the problem of a trademarked name entering common use by providing a generic name as soon as a novel pharmaceutical enters the market. For example, aripiprazole, the nonproprietary name for Abilify, was well-documented since its invention. Warfarin, originally introduced as a rat poison, was approved for human use under the brand name Coumadin.

Examples of genericization before the modern system of generic drugs include aspirin, introduced to the market in 1897, and heroin, introduced in 1898. Both were originally trademarks of Bayer AG. However, U.S. court rulings in 1918 and 1921 found the terms to be genericized, stating the company's failure to reinforce the brand's connection with their product as the reason.

A different sense of the word genericized in the pharmaceutical industry refers to products whose patent protection has expired. For example, Lipitor was genericized in the U.S. when the first competing generic version was approved by the FDA in November 2011. In this same context, the term genericization refers to the process of a brand drug losing market exclusivity to generics.

== Trademark erosion ==
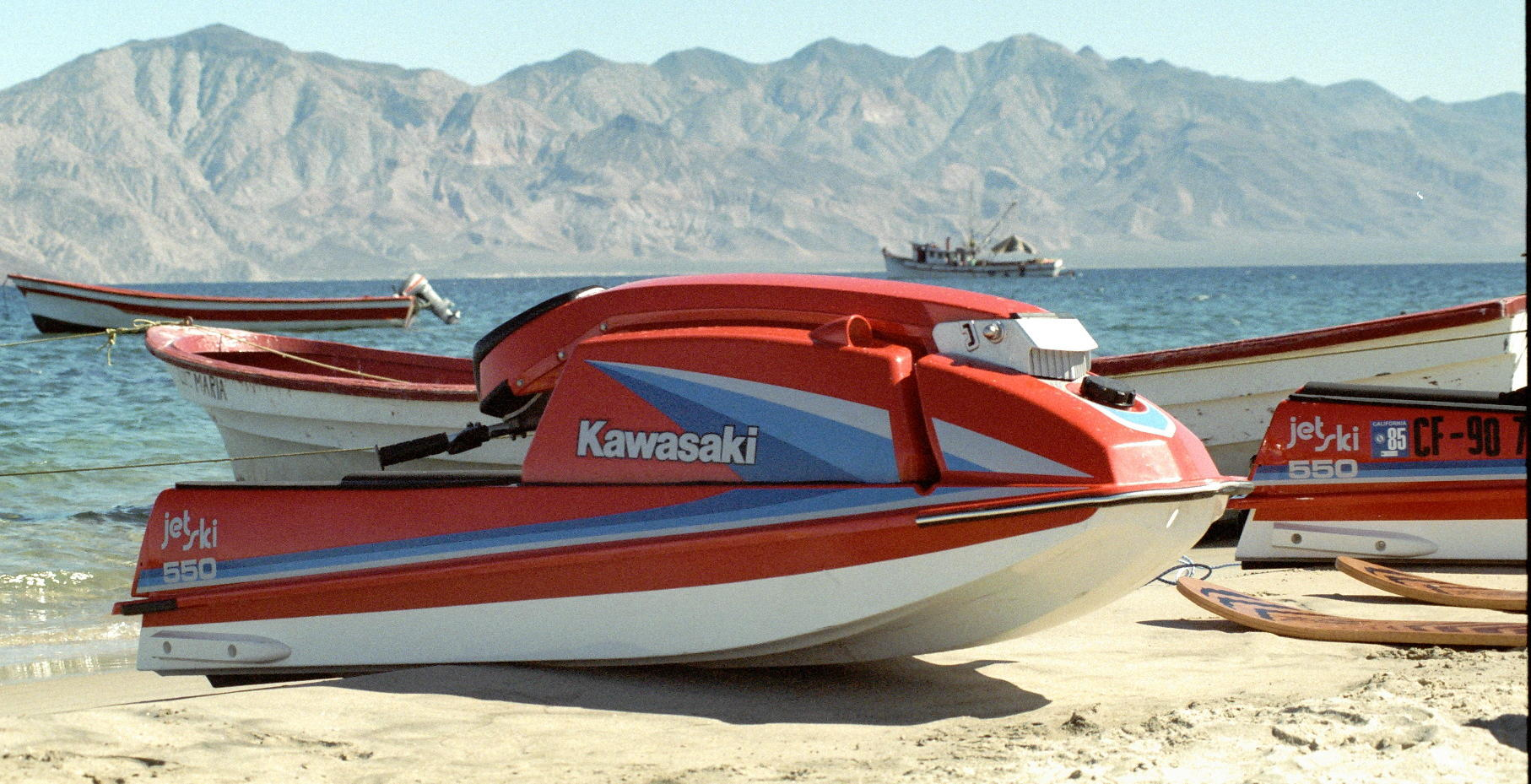
Kawasaki Jet Ski

Trademark erosion, also referred to as genericization and genericide, is a special case of antonomasia related to trademarks. It happens when a trademark becomes so common that it starts being used as a common name, most often occurring when the original company has failed to prevent such use. Once it has become an appellative, the word cannot be registered anymore; this is why companies try hard not to let their trademark become universally used, a phenomenon that could otherwise be considered a successful move since it would mean that the company had gained exceptional recognition. An example of trademark erosion is the verb "to hoover" (used with the meaning of "vacuum cleaning"), which originated from the Hoover company brand name.

Nintendo is an example of a brand that successfully fought trademark erosion, having managed to replace the common use of its name with the term "game console", which at that time was a neologism.

== Legal concepts ==
Whether or not a mark is popularly identified as genericized, the owner of the mark may still be able to enforce the proprietary rights that attach to the use or registration of the mark, as long as the mark continues to exclusively identify the owner as the commercial origin of the applicable products or services. If the mark does not perform this essential function and it is no longer possible to legally enforce rights in relation to the mark, the mark may have become generic. In many legal systems (e.g., in the United States but not in Germany) a generic mark forms part of the public domain and can be commercially exploited by anyone. Nevertheless, there exists the possibility of a trademark becoming a revocable generic term in German (and European) trademark law.

The process by which trademark rights are diminished or lost as a result of common use in the marketplace is known as genericization. This process typically occurs over a period of time in which a mark is not used as a trademark (i.e., where it is not used to exclusively identify the products or services of a particular business), where a mark falls into disuse entirely, or where the trademark owner does not enforce its rights through actions for passing off or trademark infringement.

In most countries, genericness is determined on a case-by-case basis with the final adjudicative authority held by the courts. In the United States, this approach was elucidated under Kellogg Co. v. National Biscuit Co. In countries with highly centralized executive power, genericness is determined systematically by a central authority. For example, in China, the Supreme Court rules on trademark review of administrative trademark decisions requires lower courts rule a mark generic if the government administration places those words on a standards list.

One risk factor that may lead to genericization is the use of a trademark as a verb, plural or possessive, unless the mark itself is possessive or plural (e.g., "Friendly's" restaurants).

However, in highly inflected languages, a tradename may have to carry case endings in usage. An example is Finnish, where "Microsoftin" is the genitive case and "Facebookista" is the elative case.

=== Measures taken to avoid genericization ===
Generic use of a trademark presents an inherent risk to the effective enforcement of trademark rights and may ultimately lead to genericization.

Trademark owners take various steps to reduce the risk, including educating businesses and consumers on appropriate trademark use, avoiding use of their marks in a generic manner, and systematically and effectively enforcing their trademark rights. If a trademark is associated with a new invention, the trademark owner may also consider developing a generic term for the product to be used in descriptive contexts, to avoid inappropriate use of the "house" mark. Such a term is called a generic descriptor and is frequently used immediately after the trademark to provide a description of the product or service. For example, "Kleenex tissues" ("facial tissues" being the generic descriptor) or "Velcro-brand fasteners" for Velcro brand name hook-and-loop fasteners.

Another common practice among trademark owners is to follow their trademark with the word brand to help define the word as a trademark. Johnson & Johnson changed the lyrics of their Band-Aid television commercial jingle from, "I am stuck on Band-Aids, 'cause Band-Aid's stuck on me" to "I am stuck on Band-Aid brand, 'cause Band-Aid's stuck on me." Google has gone to lengths to prevent this process, discouraging publications from using the term 'googling' in reference to Web searches. In 2006, both the Oxford English Dictionary and the Merriam Webster Collegiate Dictionary struck a balance between acknowledging widespread use of the verb coinage and preserving the particular search engine's association with the coinage, defining google (all lower case, with -le ending) as a verb meaning "use the Google search engine to obtain information on the Internet". The Swedish Language Council received a complaint from Google for its inclusion of ogooglebar (meaning 'ungoogleable') on its list of new Swedish words from 2012. The Language Council chose to remove the word to avoid a legal process, but in return wrote that "[w]e decide together which words should be and how they are defined, used and spelled".

Where a trademark is used generically, trademark owners sometimes take aggressive measures to try to retain exclusive rights to the trademark. Xerox Corporation attempted to prevent the genericization of its core trademark through an extensive public relations campaign advising consumers to "photocopy" instead of "xerox" documents.

The Lego Company has worked to prevent the genericization of its plastic building blocks following the expiration of Lego's last major patents in 1978. Lego manuals and catalogs throughout the 1980s included a message imploring customers to preserve the brand name by "referring to [their] bricks as 'LEGO Bricks or Toys', and not just 'LEGOS'." In the early 2000s, the company acquired the Legos.com URL in order to redirect customers to the Lego.com website and deliver a similar message. Despite these efforts, many children and adults in the United States continue to use "Legos" as the plural form of "Lego," but competing and interchangeable products, such as those manufactured by Mega Brands, are often referred to simply as building blocks or construction blocks. The company has successfully put legal pressure on the Swedish Academy and the Institute for Language and Folklore to remove the noun lego from their dictionaries.

Adobe Inc. has experienced mixed success with preventing the genericization of their trademarked software, Adobe Photoshop. This is shown via recurring use of "photoshop" as a noun, verb, or general adjective for all photo manipulation throughout the Internet and mass media.

== Protected designation of origin ==
Since 2003, the European Union has actively sought to restrict the use of geographical indications by third parties outside the EU by enforcing laws regarding "protected designation of origin". Although a geographical indication for specialty food or drink may be generic, it is not a trademark because it does not serve to identify exclusively a specific commercial enterprise and therefore cannot constitute a genericized trademark.

The extension of protection for geographical indications is somewhat controversial. A geographical indication may have been registered as a trademark elsewhere; for example, if "Parma Ham" was part of a trademark registered in Canada by a Canadian manufacturer, then ham manufacturers in Parma, Italy, might be unable to use this name in Canada. Wines (such as Bordeaux, Port and Champagne), cheeses (such as Roquefort, Parmesan, Gouda, and Feta), Pisco liquor, and Scotch whisky are examples of geographical indications. Compare Russian use of "Шампанское" (= Shampanskoye) for champagne-type wine made in Russia.

In the 1990s, the Parma consortium successfully sued the Asda supermarket chain to prevent it using the description "Parma ham" on prosciutto produced in Parma but sliced outside the Parma region. The European Court ruled that pre-packaged ham must be produced, sliced, and packaged in Parma in order to be labeled for sale as "Parma ham".

== Scale of distinctiveness ==
A trademark is said to fall somewhere along a scale from being "distinctive" to "generic" (used primarily as a common name for the product or service rather than an indication of source). Among distinctive trademarks the scale goes from strong to weak:

"Fanciful" or "coined"
original words with no meaning as to the nature of the product (e.g. word Kodak had no meaning before it was used as a trademark)
"Arbitrary"
existing words with little if any reference to the nature of the product or service (e.g. word Apple has no meaning related to computers, except when used as a trademark)
"Suggestive"
having primarily trademark significance but with suggestion as to the nature of the product (e.g. word Airbus suggests it is a trademark of passenger aircraft)
"Descriptive"
not just suggesting, but actually describing the product or service yet still understood as indicating source (e.g. American Airlines, which is a trademark of actual american airlines)
"Merely descriptive"
having almost entirely reference to the product or service but capable of becoming "distinctive". (e.g. Salty when used as a trademark for salty crackers)

== See also ==
- Brand management
- Counteraction principle
- Eponym
- Generic brand
- Google (verb)
- Metonymy
- Proper adjective
- Synecdoche
- Trademark dilution
