= Torbay (constituency) =

UK Parliament constituency (since 1974)

Coordinates: 50.460°N 3.538°W

- Borough constituency for the House of Commons
- Boundary of Torbay in Devon

- Location of Devon within England
- County: Devon
- Electorate: 75,742 (2023)
- Major settlements: Paignton and Torquay

Current constituency
- Created: 1974
- Member of Parliament: Steve Darling (Liberal Democrats)
- Seats: One
- Created from: Torquay

Torbay is a constituency in Devon represented in the House of Commons of the UK Parliament since 2024 by Steve Darling, a Liberal Democrat. He defeated Kevin Foster of the Conservative Party, who had held the seat since 2015.

== Constituency profile ==
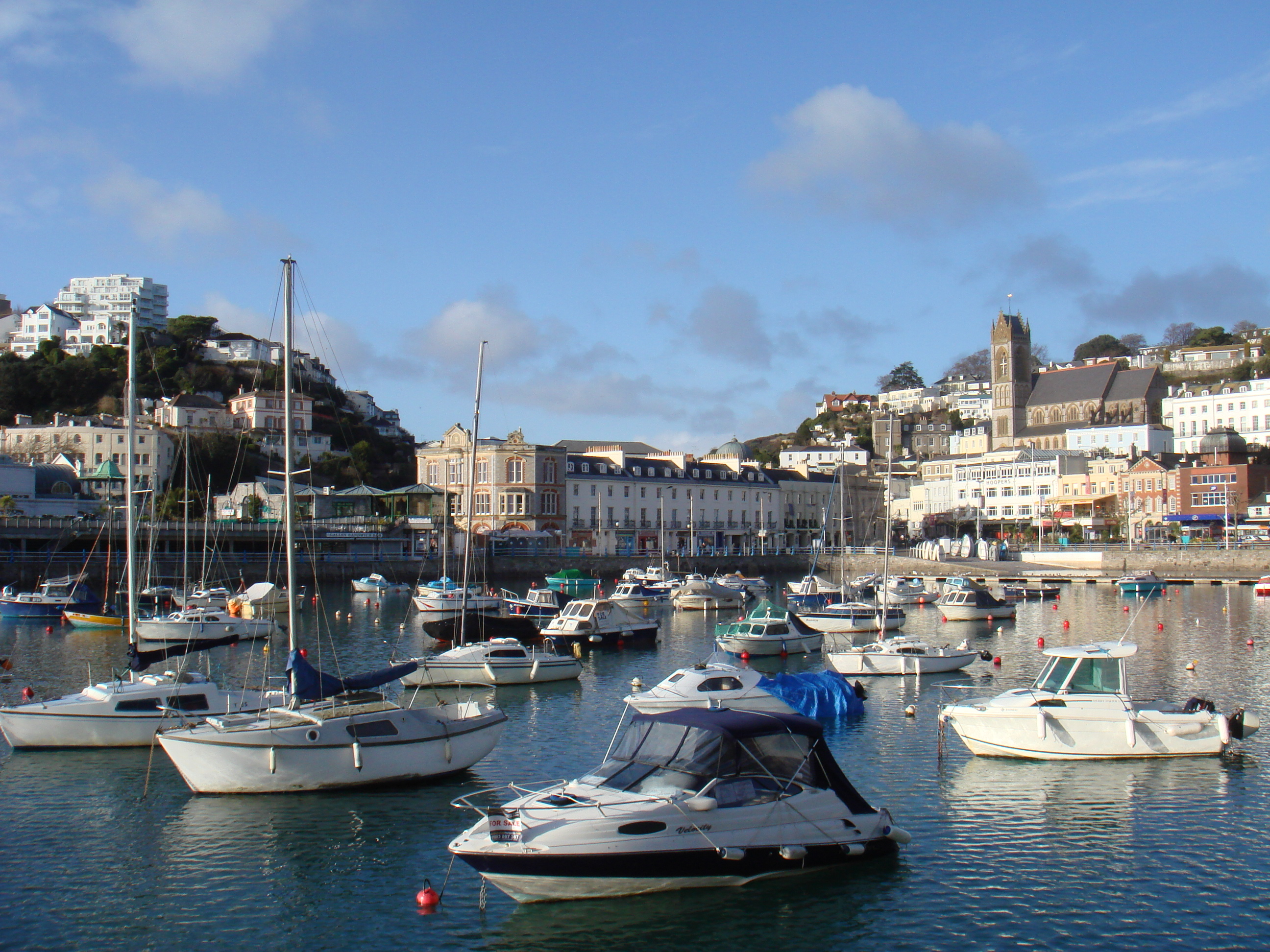
Torquay

Torbay is a constituency in Devon in South West England. It covers most of the borough of the same name, including the towns of Torquay and Paignton.

This is an urban and suburban constituency covering two adjacent towns on the English Channel coast. Torquay and Paignton were traditionally fishing settlements until they became fashionable seaside resort towns during the Victorian era; Torbay is commonly nicknamed the English Riviera for its beaches and mild climate. The towns have some wealthy suburbs, however like many coastal towns in England, most of this area suffers from high levels of deprivation due to the decline in domestic tourism in the late 20th century. House prices across Torbay are generally lower than the regional and UK averages.

Torbay has a low proportion of young adults and a large retired population. Residents have low rates of income, average levels of homeownership and above-average rates of child poverty. They have low levels of education and a high proportion work in the health and tourism sectors. The percentage of residents claiming unemployment benefits is in line with the UK-wide rate. White people made up 96% of the population at the 2021 census.

At the local council, Torquay is mostly represented by Liberal Democrats whilst Paignton elected a mixture of Liberal Democrats and Conservatives. Voters in Torbay strongly supported leaving the European Union in the 2016 referendum; an estimated 64% voted in favour of Brexit compared to the UK-wide figure of 52%.

== Boundaries ==
1974–1983: The County Borough of Torbay.

1983–2010: The Borough of Torbay wards of Cockington with Chelston, Coverdale, Ellacombe, Preston, St Marychurch, St Michael's with Goodrington, Shiphay, Tormohun, and Torwood.

2010–2024: The Borough of Torbay wards of Clifton with Maidenway, Cockington with Chelston, Ellacombe, Goodrington with Roselands, Preston, Roundham with Hyde, St Marychurch, Shiphay with the Willows, Tormohun, Watcombe, and Wellswood.

2024–present: The Borough of Torbay wards of: Barton with Watcombe; Clifton with Maidenway; Cockington with Chelston; Ellacombe; Goodrington with Roselands; Preston; Roundham with Hyde; St. Marychurch; Shiphay; Tormohun; Wellswood.

Minor changes following re-organisation of local authority wards.

The constituency covers the majority of the Torbay unitary authority in Devon, including the seaside resorts of Torquay and most of Paignton. The remainder of the borough is covered by the South Devon constituency.

== History ==
Map of current boundaries

Political history

After being held for several Parliaments (taking together various predecessor areas) by Conservatives, from 1997 the seat was held by Liberal Democrats until 2015 when the Conservatives re-took it. It was captured once again by the Liberal Democrats at the 2024 general election.

Prominent frontbenchers

Sir Frederic Bennett did not achieve his own ministry nationally, but he chaired in the European Parliament the European Democrats group.

== Members of Parliament ==
Election	Member	Party
Feb 1974	Sir Frederic Bennett	Conservative
1987	Rupert Allason	Conservative
1993	Rupert Allason	Independent (Note: Whip withdrawn)
1994	Rupert Allason	Conservative
1997	Adrian Sanders	Liberal Democrat
2015	Kevin Foster	Conservative
2024	Steve Darling	Liberal Democrat

== Elections ==
=== Elections in the 2020s ===
General election 2024: Torbay
Party	Candidate	Votes	%	±%
Liberal Democrats	Steve Darling	18,937	41.1	+16.9
Conservative	Kevin Foster	13,588	29.5	−29.6
Reform	Gordon Scott	8,660	18.8	N/A
Labour	Chris Wongsosaputro	3,276	7.1	−5.9
Green	Charlie West	1,420	3.1	+0.7
Workers Party	Paul Moor	234	0.5	N/A
Majority		5,349	11.6	N/A
Turnout		46,115	60.5	−6.8
Registered electors		76,179		
Liberal Democrats gain from Conservative		Swing	+23.3	

2019 notional result
Party	Vote	%
Conservative	30,109	59.1
Liberal Democrats	12,358	24.2
Labour	6,620	13.0
Green	1,236	2.4
Independent	648	1.3
Turnout	50,971	67.3
Electorate	75,742	

=== Elections in the 2010s ===
General election 2019: Torbay
Party	Candidate	Votes	%	±%
Conservative	Kevin Foster	29,863	59.2	+6.2
Liberal Democrats	Lee Howgate	12,114	24.0	−1.1
Labour	Michele Middleditch	6,562	13.0	−5.2
Green	Sam Moss	1,239	2.5	+1.2
Independent	James Channer	648	1.3	N/A
Majority		17,749	35.2	+7.3
Turnout		50,426	67.2	−0.2
Conservative hold		Swing	+3.65	

General election 2017: Torbay
Party	Candidate	Votes	%	±%
Conservative	Kevin Foster	27,141	53.0	+12.3
Liberal Democrats	Deborah Brewer	12,858	25.1	−8.7
Labour	Paul Raybould	9,310	18.2	+9.5
UKIP	Tony McIntyre	1,213	2.4	−11.2
Green	Sam Moss	652	1.3	−1.9
Majority		14,283	27.9	+21.0
Turnout		51,174	67.4	+4.4
Conservative hold		Swing	+10.6	

General election 2015: Torbay
Party	Candidate	Votes	%	±%
Conservative	Kevin Foster	19,551	40.7	+2.0
Liberal Democrats	Adrian Sanders	16,265	33.8	−13.2
UKIP	Anthony McIntyre	6,540	13.6	+8.3
Labour	Su Maddock	4,166	8.7	+2.1
Green	Paula Hermes	1,557	3.2	+2.2
Majority		3,286	6.9	N/A
Turnout		48,079	63.0	−1.6
Conservative gain from Liberal Democrats		Swing	+7.6	

General election 2010: Torbay
Party	Candidate	Votes	%	±%
Liberal Democrats	Adrian Sanders	23,126	47.0	+5.2
Conservative	Marcus Wood	19,048	38.7	+2.9
Labour	David Pedrick-Friend	3,231	6.6	−7.9
UKIP	Julien Parrott	2,628	5.3	−2.7
BNP	Ann Conway	709	1.4	N/A
Green	Sam Moss	468	1.0	N/A
Majority		4,078	8.3	+4.0
Turnout		49,210	64.6	+4.4
Liberal Democrats hold		Swing	+1.1	

=== Elections in the 2000s ===
General election 2005: Torbay
Party	Candidate	Votes	%	±%
Liberal Democrats	Adrian Sanders	19,317	40.8	−9.7
Conservative	Marcus Wood	17,288	36.5	+0.1
Labour	David Pedrick-Friend	6,972	14.7	+5.3
UKIP	Graham Booth	3,726	7.9	+4.7
Majority		2,029	4.3	−9.8
Turnout		47,303	61.9	−0.6
Liberal Democrats hold		Swing	−4.9	

General election 2001: Torbay
Party	Candidate	Votes	%	±%
Liberal Democrats	Adrian Sanders	24,015	50.5	+10.9
Conservative	Christian Sweeting	17,307	36.4	−3.1
Labour	John MacKay	4,484	9.4	−5.5
UKIP	Graham Booth	1,512	3.2	−0.5
Independent	Pam Neale	251	0.5	N/A
Majority		6,708	14.1	+14.0
Turnout		47,569	62.5	−11.3
Liberal Democrats hold		Swing	+7.05	

=== Elections in the 1990s ===
General election 1997: Torbay
Party	Candidate	Votes	%	±%
Liberal Democrats	Adrian Sanders	21,094	39.6	−0.2
Conservative	Rupert Allason	21,082	39.5	−10.4
Labour	Michael Morey	7,923	14.9	+5.3
UKIP	Graham Booth	1,962	3.7	N/A
Liberal	Bruce Cowling	1,161	2.2	N/A
Rainbow Dream Ticket	Paul Wild	100	0.2	N/A
Majority		12	0.1	N/A
Turnout		53,322	73.8	−6.8
Liberal Democrats gain from Conservative		Swing	+5.1	

The 12 vote majority in Torbay was originally the second smallest in any of the 659 constituencies contested at the 1997 general election, with only the Liberal Democrats' majority of 2 in Winchester being smaller. However the Winchester result was subsequently challenged and declared void resulting in a by-election.

General election 1992: Torbay
Party	Candidate	Votes	%	±%
Conservative	Rupert Allason	28,624	49.9	−4.1
Liberal Democrats	Adrian Sanders	22,837	39.8	+2.2
Labour	Peter Truscott	5,503	9.6	+1.2
National Front	Robert Jones	268	0.5	N/A
Natural Law	Alison Thomas	157	0.3	N/A
Majority		5,787	10.1	−6.3
Turnout		57,389	80.6	+4.2
Conservative hold		Swing	−3.2	

=== Elections in the 1980s ===
General election 1987: Torbay
Party	Candidate	Votes	%	±%
Conservative	Rupert Allason	29,029	54.0	+1.4
Liberal	Nicholas Bye	20,209	37.6	−1.6
Labour	Gerald Taylor	4,538	8.4	+1.2
Majority		8,820	16.4	+3.0
Turnout		53,776	76.4	+3.8
Conservative hold		Swing	+1.4	

General election 1983: Torbay
Party	Candidate	Votes	%	±%
Conservative	Frederic Bennett	25,721	52.6	−1.5
Liberal	Michael Mitchell	19,166	39.2	+16.1
Labour	Philip Rackley	3,521	7.2	−12.4
Independent	Anne Murray	500	1.0	N/A
Majority		6,555	13.4	−18.2
Turnout		48,908	72.6	−2.5
Conservative hold		Swing	+8.8	

=== Elections in the 1970s ===
General election 1979: Torbay
Party	Candidate	Votes	%	±%
Conservative	Frederic Bennett	36,099	54.1	+5.7
Liberal	Michael Mitchell	15,231	23.1	−5.4
Labour	Elaine Fear	12,919	19.6	−3.5
Ecology	David Abrahams	1,161	1.8	N/A
National Front	June Spry	647	1.0	N/A
Majority		20,868	31.0	+11.1
Turnout		66,057	75.1	+2.2
Conservative hold		Swing	+5.5	

General election October 1974: Torbay
Party	Candidate	Votes	%	±%
Conservative	Frederic Bennett	30,208	48.4	−0.2
Liberal	John Goss	17,770	28.5	−1.9
Labour	Jack Tench	14,441	23.1	+2.0
Majority		12,438	19.9	+1.7
Turnout		62,419	72.9	−7.4
Conservative hold		Swing	−1.1	

General election February 1974: Torbay
Party	Candidate	Votes	%	±%
Conservative	Frederic Bennett	33,163	48.6	
Liberal	Bridget Trethewey	20,755	30.4	
Labour	Jack Tench	14,389	21.1	
Majority		12,408	18.2	
Turnout		68,307	80.3	
Conservative win (new seat)				

== See also ==
- List of parliamentary constituencies in Devon
