= 1997 Winchester by-election =

English parliamentary by-election

- 20 November 1997
- Turnout: 68.7%
	First party	Second party
Candidate	Mark Oaten	Gerry Malone
Party	Liberal Democrats	Conservative
Popular vote	37,006	15,450
Percentage	68.0%	28.4%
Swing	▲26.0pp	▼13.6pp
MP before election
Gerry Malone
Conservative
Elected MP
Mark Oaten
Liberal Democrats

A by-election for the United Kingdom parliamentary constituency of Winchester was held on 20 November 1997 after its result at the general election the previous May was declared void. Mark Oaten of the Liberal Democrats won the seat with a wafer-thin majority of two votes over Conservative Gerry Malone earlier in the year, but following a legal challenge, a new election was allowed by the High Court. Oaten was re-elected with a drastically increased majority of 21,556.

Controversy over confusing and deceptive candidate descriptions played a role in dispute over the initial general election result, and paved the way for the Registration of Political Parties Act 1998 which outlawed the practice. The 1997 Beckenham by-election was held on the same day.

== History ==
At the general election on 1 May 1997, Mark Oaten was originally declared the winner, with a majority of two votes over Conservative Gerry Malone, 20 hours after counting began, with many recounts and haggling over spoilt ballots.

Oaten was unseated on an electoral petition on 6 October 1997. The High Court held that 54 votes declared void for want of the official mark would have changed the result if counted. The court could not be sure they were not the product of a mistake, therefore deemed that the result was uncertain. They allowed the petition and declared the election void. The writ for the new election was moved on 28 October 1997.

The by-election on 20 November resulted in a clear win by Oaten – his majority was 21,556 over second placed Malone. Campaigning had focused on Oaten's speaking record in the House of Commons after the general election, while the nature of the controversial 1 May election result was also an issue for some Liberal Democrat voters.

The Independent wrote, "Although careful not to articulate it themselves, their unofficial campaign slogan is: 'When the umpire gives you out, you should walk'", alluding to the unseated Malone. The Labour Party obtained their worst ever results in a parliamentary election at the time, in part because they hardly campaigned at all and instead focused their priorities on the by-election in Beckenham held on the same day, which they also failed to win. The Winchester by-election remained Labour's worst-ever result until 2021, when they polled 1.6 per cent of the vote in the Chesham and Amersham by-election, again won by the Lib Dems.

Both the original and rerun election involved an incidence of a candidate using an attempted confusing description. Richard Huggett described himself in the general election as Liberal Democrat Top Choice For Parliament (leading to Oaten, the official Lib Dem candidate, to use the ballot paper description Liberal Democrat Leader Paddy Ashdown) and in the by election as Literal Democrat Mark Here to Win. The Registration of Political Parties Act 1998 put an end to this practice.

This was also the last election in which Screaming Lord Sutch, founder of the Official Monster Raving Loony Party, ran for a parliamentary seat. He died by suicide in June 1999.

== Result ==
By election 1997: Winchester
Party	Candidate	Votes	%	±%
Liberal Democrats	Mark Oaten	37,006	68.0	+26.0
Conservative	Gerry Malone	15,450	28.4	−13.6
Labour	Patrick Davies	944	1.7	−8.8
UKIP	Robin Page	521	1.0	+0.2
Monster Raving Loony	Lord David Sutch	316	0.6	+0.1
"Literal Democrat Mark Here to Win"	Richard Huggett	59	0.1	−0.9
Natural Law	Rosemary Barry	48	0.1	New
Ind. Conservative	Roger Everest	40	0.1	New
Majority		21,556	39.6	N/A
Turnout		54,384	68.7	–9.9
Liberal Democrats gain from Conservative		Swing	+19.8	

=== General election result ===
General election 1997: Winchester
Party	Candidate	Votes	%	±%
Liberal Democrats	Mark Oaten	26,100	42.060	+4.3
Conservative	Gerry Malone	26,098	42.057	−8.0
Labour	Patrick Davies	6,528	10.5	+3.1
Referendum	Peter Strand	1,598	2.6	New
"Liberal Democrat Top Choice for Parliament"	Richard Huggett	640	1.0	New
UKIP	Derek Rumsey	476	0.8	New
Independent	John Browne	307	0.5	−4.2
Monster Raving Loony	Peter Stockton	307	0.5	New
Majority		2	0.0	N/A
Turnout		62,054	78.6	−4.6
Void election result		Swing		

== See also ==
- 1990 York North federal by-election, a by-election in Canada held under identical circumstances
