= 2019 Torbay Council election =

2019 UK local government election

- 2 May 2019

All 36 seats to Torbay Council 19 seats needed for a majority

| | First party | Second party | Third party |
|---|---|---|---|
| Party | Conservative | Liberal Democrats | Independent |
| Seats won | 15 | 13 | 8 |
| Seat change | ▼10 | ▲6 | ▲5 |
| Popular vote | 25,722 | 20,926 | 14,891 |
| Percentage | 34.2% | 27.8% | 19.8% |
- Map of the results of the election by ward

The 2019 Torbay Council election took place on 2 May 2019 to elect members of Torbay Council in England. This was on the same day as other local elections. The Conservatives lost the council to no overall control.

== Results summary ==
=== Election result ===
2019 Torbay Council election
| Party | Candidates | Seats | Gains | Losses | Net gain/loss | Seats % | Votes % | Votes | +/− |
|---|---|---|---|---|---|---|---|---|---|
| Conservative | 36 | 15 | N/A | N/A | ▼10 | 41.7 | 34.2 | 25,722 | –1.6 |
| Liberal Democrats | 36 | 13 | N/A | N/A | ▲6 | 36.1 | 27.8 | 20,926 | +3.3 |
| Independent | 25 | 8 | N/A | N/A | ▲5 | 22.2 | 19.8 | 14,891 | +14.8 |
| Green | 20 | 0 | N/A | N/A | Steady | 0.0 | 8.4 | 6,325 | –0.7 |
| Labour | 16 | 0 | N/A | N/A | Steady | 0.0 | 5.4 | 4,100 | –4.0 |
| UKIP | 9 | 0 | N/A | N/A | ▼1 | 0.0 | 4.5 | 3,352 | –11.7 |

== Results by ward ==
A * denotes an incumbent.

Ward boundaries

=== Barton with Watcombe ===
Barton with Watcombe (3 seats)
| Party | Candidate | Votes | % | ±% |
|---|---|---|---|---|
| Liberal Democrats | Steve Darling* | 1,460 | 55.3 | |
| Liberal Democrats | John Dudley | 1,252 | 47.5 | |
| Liberal Democrats | Robert Long* | 1,151 | 43.6 | |
| Conservative | Martin Brook | 754 | 28.6 | |
| Conservative | Cyril Glazebrook | 617 | 23.4 | |
| Conservative | Lindsay Glazebrook | 584 | 22.1 | |
| Independent | Jacqueline Wakeham | 449 | 17.0 | |
| Green | Julie Richardson | 316 | 12.0 | |
| Labour | Dani Passmore | 232 | 8.8 | |
| Majority | | | | |
| Turnout | | | 31.5 | |
| Registered electors | | 8,463 | | |
| Liberal Democrats win (new seat) | | | | |
| Liberal Democrats win (new seat) | | | | |
| Liberal Democrats win (new seat) | | | | |

=== Churston with Galmpton ===
Churston with Galmpton (2 seats)
| Party | Candidate | Votes | % | ±% |
|---|---|---|---|---|
| Conservative | Karen Kennedy | 1,369 | 54.3 | |
| Conservative | Judith Mills | 1,369 | 54.3 | |
| Green | Jane Hughes | 578 | 22.9 | |
| Liberal Democrats | Dennis Shearman | 532 | 21.1 | |
| Liberal Democrats | Katherine Oliverio | 423 | 16.8 | |
| Labour | Howard Ingham | 261 | 10.3 | |
| Majority | | | | |
| Turnout | | | 46.4 | |
| Registered electors | | 5,616 | | |
| Conservative win (new seat) | | | | |
| Conservative win (new seat) | | | | |

=== Clifton with Maidenway ===
Clifton with Maidenway (2 seats)
| Party | Candidate | Votes | % | ±% |
|---|---|---|---|---|
| Liberal Democrats | Ian Doggett* | 866 | 45.4 | |
| Liberal Democrats | Margaret Douglas-Dunbar | 823 | 43.2 | |
| Conservative | John Fellows | 565 | 29.6 | |
| Conservative | Dianne Swindells | 491 | 25.8 | |
| Green | Susan Kenning | 269 | 14.1 | |
| Independent | Jacqueline Colby | 249 | 13.1 | |
| Labour | Eric Rossiter | 159 | 8.3 | |
| Labour | Christopher Harvey | 158 | 8.3 | |
| Majority | | | | |
| Turnout | | | 32.2 | |
| Registered electors | | 6,024 | | |
| Liberal Democrats win (new seat) | | | | |
| Liberal Democrats win (new seat) | | | | |

=== Cockington with Chelston ===
Cockington with Chelston (2 seats)
| Party | Candidate | Votes | % | ±% |
|---|---|---|---|---|
| Independent | Nicole Amil* | 1,008 | 42.1 | |
| Conservative | Andrew Barrand | 569 | 23.8 | |
| Independent | Colin Charlwood | 559 | 23.4 | |
| Conservative | Jane Head | 500 | 20.9 | |
| Labour | Jack Critchlow | 486 | 20.3 | |
| Liberal Democrats | Lily James | 332 | 13.9 | |
| Liberal Democrats | Alistair Brierley | 300 | 12.5 | |
| UKIP | Mark Dent | 241 | 10.1 | |
| Labour | Julia Neal | 235 | 9.8 | |
| Green | Michael Tait | 231 | 9.6 | |
| Majority | | | | |
| Turnout | | | 39.7 | |
| Registered electors | | 6,039 | | |
| Independent win (new seat) | | | | |
| Conservative win (new seat) | | | | |

=== Collaton St Mary ===
Collaton St Mary (1 seat)
| Party | Candidate | Votes | % | ±% |
|---|---|---|---|---|
| Conservative | Anthony Thomas* | 270 | 41.7 | |
| Green | Emily Heather | 136 | 21.0 | |
| Independent | Timothy King | 135 | 20.8 | |
| Liberal Democrats | Christine Pountney | 107 | 16.5 | |
| Majority | | | | |
| Turnout | | 660 | 30.8 | |
| Registered electors | | 2,140 | | |
| Rejected ballots | | 12 | 1.8 | |
| Conservative win (new seat) | | | | |

=== Ellacombe ===
Ellacombe (2 seats)
| Party | Candidate | Votes | % | ±% |
|---|---|---|---|---|
| Liberal Democrats | Jermaine Atiya-Alla | 431 | 27.8 | |
| Liberal Democrats | Jack Dart | 408 | 26.3 | |
| Independent | Cynthia Stocks* | 338 | 21.8 | |
| Conservative | Paul Jones | 311 | 20.1 | |
| Conservative | Amanda Castle | 309 | 19.9 | |
| UKIP | Steven Walsh | 300 | 19.3 | |
| Independent | Stefanie Curran | 240 | 15.5 | |
| Green | Hazel Robertson | 218 | 14.1 | |
| Labour | John Coombs | 172 | 11.1 | |
| Majority | | | | |
| Turnout | | | 28.1 | |
| Registered electors | | 5,558 | | |
| Liberal Democrats win (new seat) | | | | |
| Liberal Democrats win (new seat) | | | | |

=== Furzeham with Summercombe ===
Furzeham with Summercombe (3 seats)
| Party | Candidate | Votes | % | ±% |
|---|---|---|---|---|
| Independent | Jacqueline Stockman* | 1,628 | 53.7 | |
| Independent | Michael Morey* | 1,572 | 51.9 | |
| Independent | Victor Ellery* | 1,144 | 37.8 | |
| Independent | Richard Haddock* | 827 | 27.3 | |
| UKIP | Michael Cuggy | 538 | 17.8 | |
| Conservative | David Greenway | 524 | 17.3 | |
| Green | John Fallon | 498 | 16.4 | |
| Conservative | Stephen Bryant | 460 | 15.2 | |
| Conservative | Elliot Abercrombie | 383 | 12.6 | |
| Liberal Democrats | Eileen Fox | 200 | 6.6 | |
| Liberal Democrats | Dave Fordham | 183 | 6.0 | |
| Liberal Democrats | Mark Pountney | 151 | 5.0 | |
| Majority | | | | |
| Turnout | | | 37.8 | |
| Registered electors | | 8,084 | | |
| Independent win (new seat) | | | | |
| Independent win (new seat) | | | | |
| Independent win (new seat) | | | | |

=== Goodrington with Roselands ===
Goodrington with Roselands (2 seats)
| Party | Candidate | Votes | % | ±% |
|---|---|---|---|---|
| Liberal Democrats | John Howgate | 798 | 35.9 | |
| Liberal Democrats | Richard Heyse | 761 | 34.2 | |
| Conservative | Penelope-Jane Barnby* | 716 | 32.2 | |
| Conservative | Alan Tyerman* | 565 | 25.4 | |
| Independent | Derek Mills* | 343 | 15.4 | |
| UKIP | Ian Walsh | 332 | 14.9 | |
| Green | Malcolm Turner | 245 | 11.0 | |
| Labour | Neil Cussons | 163 | 7.3 | |
| Majority | | | | |
| Turnout | | | 38.1 | |
| Registered electors | | 5,891 | | |
| Liberal Democrats win (new seat) | | | | |
| Liberal Democrats win (new seat) | | | | |

=== King's Ash ===
Kings Ash (2 seats)
| Party | Candidate | Votes | % | ±% |
|---|---|---|---|---|
| Conservative | John Kavanagh | 415 | 31.8 | |
| Conservative | Jacqueline Thomas | 382 | 29.2 | |
| Independent | David Watt | 338 | 25.9 | |
| Liberal Democrats | Judith Somerville | 266 | 20.4 | |
| Green | Neil Rolfe | 244 | 18.7 | |
| Labour | Josh Adams | 227 | 17.4 | |
| Liberal Democrats | Catherine Johns | 213 | 16.3 | |
| Labour | Edward Harris | 207 | 15.8 | |
| Majority | | | | |
| Turnout | | | 24.8 | |
| Registered electors | | 5,367 | | |
| Conservative win (new seat) | | | | |
| Conservative win (new seat) | | | | |

=== Preston ===
Preston (3 seats)
| Party | Candidate | Votes | % | ±% |
|---|---|---|---|---|
| Conservative | Christopher Lewis* | 1,461 | 48.0 | |
| Conservative | Linda Sykes* | 1,320 | 43.4 | |
| Conservative | David Thomas* | 1,200 | 39.4 | |
| Liberal Democrats | Wendy Avenell | 658 | 21.6 | |
| Liberal Democrats | Thomas Pentney | 559 | 18.3 | |
| Green | Sophie Downs | 545 | 17.9 | |
| Labour | Elizabeth Parnell | 480 | 15.8 | |
| UKIP | Eileen Harvey | 465 | 15.3 | |
| Liberal Democrats | Michael Stockman | 459 | 15.1 | |
| UKIP | Christine Dayment | 457 | 15.0 | |
| Labour | Rosalind Royle | 303 | 10.0 | |
| Labour | Stephen Wood | 301 | 9.9 | |
| Majority | | | | |
| Turnout | | | 37.7 | |
| Registered electors | | 8,118 | | |
| Conservative win (new seat) | | | | |
| Conservative win (new seat) | | | | |
| Conservative win (new seat) | | | | |

=== Roundham with Hyde ===
Roundham with Hyde (2 seats)
| Party | Candidate | Votes | % | ±% |
|---|---|---|---|---|
| Conservative | Barbara Lewis* | 619 | 33.7 | |
| Liberal Democrats | Christine Carter* | 609 | 33.2 | |
| Conservative | Christopher Robson* | 530 | 28.9 | |
| Liberal Democrats | Nigel Penny | 517 | 28.1 | |
| UKIP | Jeanette Walsh | 330 | 18.0 | |
| Green | Simon Moss | 295 | 16.1 | |
| Green | Paula Hermes | 277 | 15.1 | |
| Independent | Timothy Ahlbeck | 156 | 8.5 | |
| Majority | | | | |
| Turnout | | | 30.4 | |
| Registered electors | | 6,082 | | |
| Conservative win (new seat) | | | | |
| Liberal Democrats win (new seat) | | | | |

=== Shiphay ===
Shiphay (2 seats)
| Party | Candidate | Votes | % | ±% |
|---|---|---|---|---|
| Independent | Darren Cowell | 822 | 40.8 | |
| Independent | Robert Loxton | 774 | 38.4 | |
| Conservative | Mark Kingscote* | 555 | 27.6 | |
| Conservative | Daniel Maddock | 514 | 25.5 | |
| Liberal Democrats | Dennis Brewer | 394 | 19.6 | |
| Liberal Democrats | Richard Raybould | 337 | 16.7 | |
| Green | Jennifer Stoneman | 261 | 13.0 | |
| Labour | Stuart Gale | 157 | 7.8 | |
| Majority | | | | |
| Turnout | | | 33.7 | |
| Registered electors | | 6,029 | | |
| Independent win (new seat) | | | | |
| Independent win (new seat) | | | | |

=== St Marychurch ===
St Marychurch (3 seats)
| Party | Candidate | Votes | % | ±% |
|---|---|---|---|---|
| Conservative | Hazel Foster | 1,057 | 33.9 | |
| Conservative | Anne Brooks* | 992 | 31.9 | |
| Conservative | Raymond Hill* | 982 | 31.5 | |
| Liberal Democrats | Deborah Brewer | 930 | 29.9 | |
| Liberal Democrats | Gillian Hayman | 885 | 28.4 | |
| Liberal Democrats | David Ward | 825 | 26.5 | |
| Independent | Paul Moor | 474 | 15.2 | |
| Independent | Julie Brandon | 437 | 14.0 | |
| Green | Jennifer Giel | 416 | 13.4 | |
| Green | Richard Boyles | 375 | 12.0 | |
| UKIP | Michael Simpson | 371 | 11.9 | |
| Independent | Brian Roberts | 343 | 11.0 | |
| Labour | Keith Christmas | 293 | 9.4 | |
| Majority | | | | |
| Turnout | | | 34.9 | |
| Registered electors | | 8,987 | | |
| Conservative win (new seat) | | | | |
| Conservative win (new seat) | | | | |
| Conservative win (new seat) | | | | |

=== St Peters with St Marys ===
St Peters with St Marys (2 seats)
| Party | Candidate | Votes | % | ±% |
|---|---|---|---|---|
| Independent | Celia Brown | 729 | 41.3 | |
| Independent | Terry Manning* | 667 | 37.8 | |
| Conservative | Stephen Bryant | 574 | 32.5 | |
| Conservative | Paul Labistour | 454 | 25.7 | |
| Green | Julian Gunther | 400 | 22.7 | |
| Liberal Democrats | Jean Cope | 166 | 9.4 | |
| Liberal Democrats | Adam Carter | 160 | 9.1 | |
| Majority | | | | |
| Turnout | | | 34.4 | |
| Registered electors | | 5,254 | | |
| Independent win (new seat) | | | | |
| Independent win (new seat) | | | | |

=== Tormohun ===
Tormohun (3 seats)
| Party | Candidate | Votes | % | ±% |
|---|---|---|---|---|
| Liberal Democrats | Amanda Darling* | 1,124 | 44.5 | |
| Liberal Democrats | Nicholas Pentney* | 962 | 38.2 | |
| Liberal Democrats | Cordelia Law | 935 | 37.1 | |
| Conservative | John Doherty | 614 | 24.4 | |
| Conservative | Roger Heath | 561 | 22.3 | |
| Conservative | Lucius Gray | 540 | 21.4 | |
| Independent | Robert Pernull-Excell* | 453 | 18.0 | |
| Independent | Suzannah Jones | 384 | 15.2 | |
| Independent | Lynette Stone | 313 | 12.4 | |
| Green | Helen Boyles | 297 | 11.8 | |
| Labour | Virginia Keyes | 266 | 10.6 | |
| Green | Jimi Neary | 207 | 8.2 | |
| Green | Richard Spreckley | 164 | 6.5 | |
| Majority | | | | |
| Turnout | | | 30.0 | |
| Registered electors | | 8,510 | | |
| Liberal Democrats win (new seat) | | | | |
| Liberal Democrats win (new seat) | | | | |
| Liberal Democrats win (new seat) | | | | |

=== Wellswood ===
Wellswood (2 seats)
| Party | Candidate | Votes | % | ±% |
|---|---|---|---|---|
| Conservative | Nicholas Bye* | 1,387 | 56.3 | |
| Conservative | James O'Dwyer | 1,209 | 49.0 | |
| Liberal Democrats | Fiona McPhail | 512 | 20.8 | |
| Independent | Richard Thomas | 509 | 20.6 | |
| Green | Gillian Baker | 353 | 14.3 | |
| UKIP | Kenneth Stiling | 318 | 12.9 | |
| Liberal Democrats | Fiona Hess | 238 | 9.7 | |
| Majority | | | | |
| Turnout | | | 43.7 | |
| Registered electors | | 5,660 | | |
| Conservative win (new seat) | | | | |
| Conservative win (new seat) | | | | |

== Changes 2019–2023 ==
=== Affiliation changes ===
Churston with Galmpton councillors Karen Kennedy and Judith Mills resigned from the Conservative Group in October 2020 to sit as members of the Independent Group, changing the council's political balance to 14 Conservative, 12 Liberal Democrat and 10 Independent.

=== By-elections ===
==== Goodrington with Roselands ====
The by-election was held on 14 November 2019, following the resignation of Councillor Rick Heyse.

Goodrington with Roselands, 14 November 2019
| Party | Candidate | Votes | % | ±% |
|---|---|---|---|---|
| Conservative | Penelope-Jane Barnby* | 892 | 49.3 | +17.1 |
| Liberal Democrats | Dennis Shearman | 641 | 35.5 | +1.3 |
| Brexit Party | Eddie Davis | 168 | 9.3 | N/A |
| Labour | Catherine Fritz | 72 | 4.0 | −3.3 |
| Green | Jane Hughes | 35 | 1.9 | −9.1 |
| Majority | | | | |
| Turnout | | 1,808 | | |
| Conservative gain from Liberal Democrats | | Swing | | |

==== Clifton with Maidenway ====
The by-election was held on 6 May 2021, following the death of Councillor Ian Doggett.

Clifton with Maidenway, 6 May 2021
| Party | Candidate | Votes | % | ±% |
|---|---|---|---|---|
| Liberal Democrats | Cat Johns | 1,014 | 45.8 | +0.4 |
| Conservative | John Fellows | 983 | 44.4 | +14.8 |
| Labour | Andy Simons | 149 | 6.7 | −1.6 |
| Green | Susan Kenning | 69 | 3.1 | −11.0 |
| Majority | | | | |
| Turnout | | 2,215 | 36.49 | |
| Liberal Democrats hold | | Swing | | |
