= Kevin Foster (politician) =

British Conservative politician (born 1978)

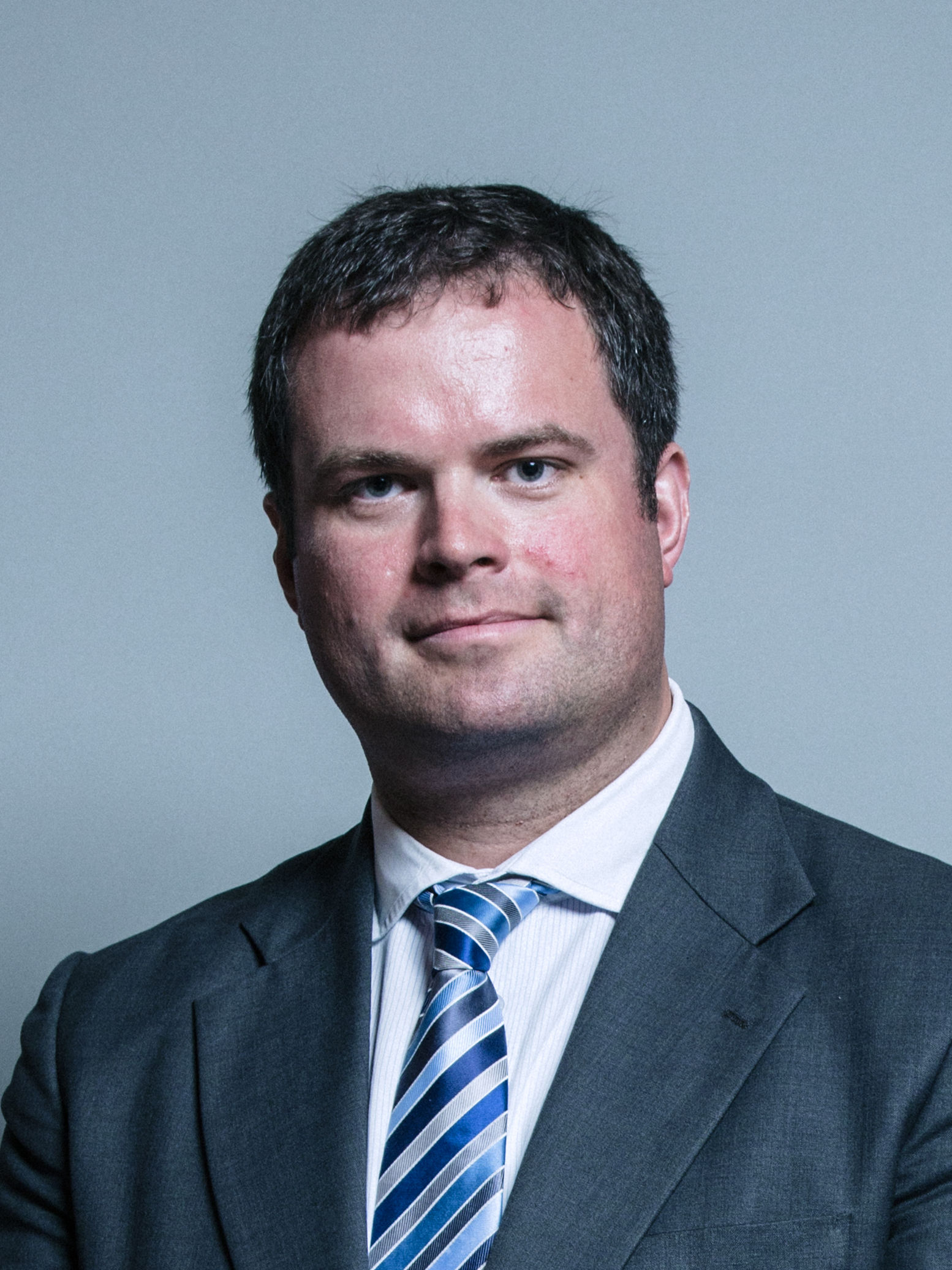
- Official portrait, 2017

Minister of State for Transport
- In office 7 September 2022 – 26 October 2022
- Prime Minister: Liz Truss
- Preceded by: Wendy Morton
- Succeeded by: Huw Merriman

Parliamentary Under-Secretary of State for Safe and Legal Migration (Note: Parliamentary Under-Secretary of State for Immigration from 2019 to 2020, Parliamentary Under-Secretary of State for Future Borders and Immigration from 2020 to 2021)
- In office 16 December 2019 – 6 September 2022
- Prime Minister: Boris Johnson
- Preceded by: Seema Kennedy
- Succeeded by: Tom Pursglove

Parliamentary Under-Secretary of State for Wales
- In office 4 April 2019 – 16 December 2019
- Prime Minister: Theresa May; Boris Johnson
- Preceded by: Nigel Adams
- Succeeded by: David Davies

Member of Parliament for Torbay
- In office 7 May 2015 – 30 May 2024
- Preceded by: Adrian Sanders
- Succeeded by: Steve Darling

Personal details
- Born: 31 December 1978 (age 47) Plymouth, England, UK
- Party: Conservative
- Education: University of Warwick
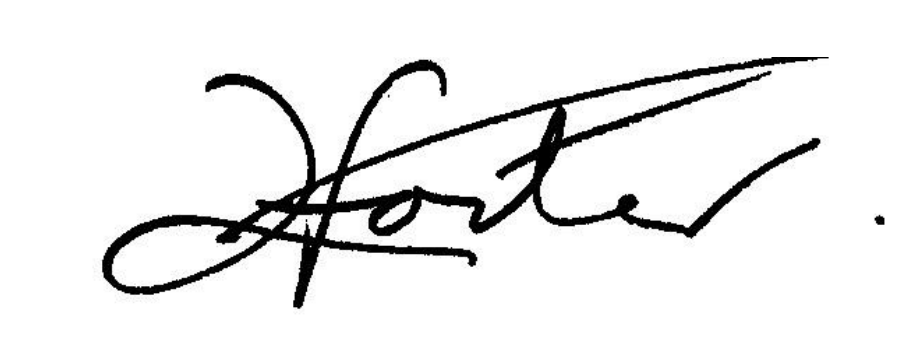
- Signature
- Website: www.kevinjfoster.com

Kevin John Foster (born 31 December 1978) is a British Conservative Party politician who was the Member of Parliament for Torbay from 2015 to 2024. He served as Minister of State for Transport from September 2022 until October 2022. Foster served under Home Secretary Priti Patel as Parliamentary Under-Secretary of State for Safe and Legal Migration from 2019 until September 2022.

== Early life and career ==
Kevin Foster was born on 31 December 1978 in Plymouth. His early education was at the community school Hele's School. Foster then studied law at the University of Warwick, graduating with an LLB in 2000 and an LLM in 2001. After graduating from university, he worked in the West Midlands as a paralegal and secretary for a number of firms.

Foster stood as the Conservative candidate in the Cheylesmore ward of Coventry City Council in 2002. He was re-elected in 2004, 2007 and 2011. He served as Leader of the opposition for two years in Coventry, before standing down in 2013 to contest the 2015 general election in Torbay.

== Parliamentary career ==
Foster stood as the Conservative candidate in Coventry South at the 2010 general election, coming second with 33.4% of the vote behind the incumbent Labour Party MP Jim Cunningham.

Foster was elected as MP for Torbay at the 2015 general election with 40.7% of the vote and a majority of 3,286. His election agent Alison Hernandez was investigated by the Independent Police Complaints Commission over allegations she failed to properly declare election expenses that were submitted in her role. This investigation was later dropped in 2017 by the Crown Prosecution Service as although "the returns may have been inaccurate, there is insufficient evidence to prove to the criminal standard that any candidate or agent was dishonest".

Foster supported the United Kingdom remaining within the European Union at the 2016 Brexit referendum. Since then, he has almost always voted against UK membership of the EU in Parliament.

At the snap 2017 general election, Foster was re-elected as MP for Torbay with an increased vote share of 53% and an increased majority of 14,283.

Foster voted for Prime Minister Theresa May's Brexit withdrawal agreement in early 2019. He was appointed as Parliamentary Private Secretary (PPS) in the Department for Communities and Local Government. He later became PPS to then Minister for the Cabinet Office David Lidington.

In July 2019, following Boris Johnson becoming prime minister, Foster served as Parliamentary Private Secretary to the Cabinet Office, Parliamentary Under-Secretary of State in the Wales Office, and an assistant government whip.

Foster was again re-elected at the 2019 general election with an increased vote share of 59.2% and an increased majority of 17,749.

In February 2022, Foster received widespread criticism for stating on Twitter that Ukrainian refugees could use the seasonal worker scheme in order to get into the UK. Scottish First Minister, Nicola Sturgeon, and Shadow Foreign Secretary, David Lammy, were among the critics, with the latter saying that Foster's comments showed 'a shameful moral vacuum at the heart of Government'. Foster deleted the tweet within hours.

Foster endorsed Liz Truss in the July–September 2022 Conservative Party leadership election. Following Truss's election as Prime Minister, Foster was appointed as Minister of State for Transport with responsibility for rail. He left the government following Rishi Sunak's appointment as Prime Minister and returned to the backbenches.

In June 2023, Foster was re-selected as the Conservative candidate for Torbay. In the 2024 general election, he lost the election to Liberal Democrat Steve Darling.

== Personal life ==
Kevin Foster married Hazel Noonan (born 1951) in 2017. They met in Coventry when he was a University of Warwick student. He was helping her to canvass for the Conservative Party in the local council elections in which she was a candidate. The 28-year age gap between Foster and Noonan has drawn comparisons to Emmanuel Macron, the President of France, who is also substantially younger than his partner.

== Notes ==
Parliament of the United Kingdom
Preceded by Adrian Sanders	Member of Parliament for Torbay; 2015–2024	Succeeded by Steve Darling
