= Giles Chichester =

British Conservative Party politician (1946–2026)

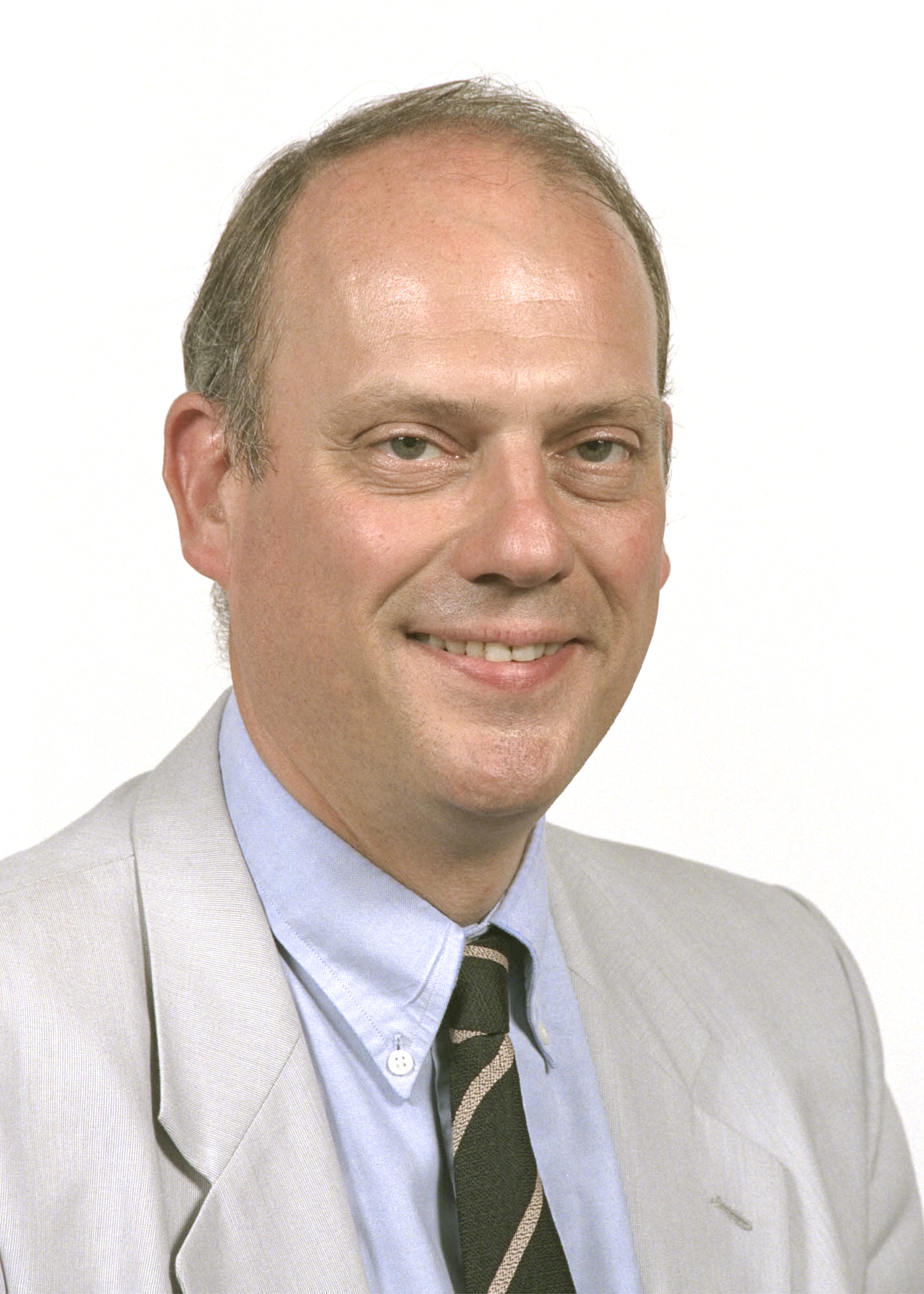
- Chichester in 1994

Member of the European Parliament for South West England
- In office 10 June 1999 – 26 May 2014
- Succeeded by: Clare Moody

Member of the European Parliament for Devon and East Plymouth
- In office 1994–1999
- Succeeded by: Constituency abolished

Personal details
- Born: Giles Bryan Chichester; 29 July 1946 London, England
- Died: 12 August 2026 (aged 80)
- Party: Conservative
- Parent: Sir Francis Chichester (father)
- Education: Westminster School; Christ Church, Oxford

Giles Bryan Chichester (29 July 1946 – 12 August 2026) was a British Conservative Party politician who was a Member of the European Parliament (MEP) for South West England and Gibraltar from 1999 until he retired in 2014. He was elected as Vice-President of the European Parliament on 6 July 2011 to replace Silvana Koch-Mehrin who had resigned over plagiarism allegations.

== Early life and career ==
Giles Bryan Chichester was born in London on 29 July 1946. He educated at Westminster School and Christ Church, Oxford. From 1969, he worked in the family business, Francis Chichester Ltd (publishers of maps, guides and educational wallcharts), founded by his father Sir Francis Chichester KBE. He lived in the family home at 9 St James's Place, London SW1.

He was MEP for Devon and East Plymouth from 1994 to 1999 and represented South West England in the European Parliament from 1999 until 2014. On 23 July 2004 he was elected chair of the Parliamentary Committee on Industry, Research and Energy.

Chichester was chairman of the Carlton Club Political Committee and his family business, publishing maps.

He described himself as a "climate change sceptic".

== Expenses ==
On 5 June 2008, Chichester voluntarily stepped down as Leader of the Conservative MEPs in order to clear his name after it was alleged that since 1996 he had wrongly sent European parliamentary funds for secretarial and office services through his family business of which he was a paid director: he was succeeded by his deputy, Philip Bushill-Matthews. Chichester insisted it was his understanding that the contract had been accepted by the EU Parliament in 1999 and in 2004, and that he transferred money for his political staff through the company simply as an easier means of administration. The European Parliament suggested that a change in the Financial Regulation in 2003 meant this arrangement could constitute a potential conflict of interest.

The situation arose while as Leader of the Conservative MEPs Cameron had tasked Chichester to review and compile a code of conduct for Conservative MEPs' expenses after the embarrassment of MP Derek Conway. However, Chichester admitted that once he had been told the contract was not in order he cancelled it immediately and described it as a "whoopsy-daisy" surprise to him.

Chichester stood again successfully for re-election as an MEP in 2009.

== Death ==
Chichester died on 12 August 2026, aged 80.

European Parliament
New constituency	Member of European Parliament for South West England and Gibraltar; 2004 –2014	Incumbent
New constituency	Member of European Parliament for South West England; 1999–2004	Constituency abolished
New constituency	Member of European Parliament for Devon and East Plymouth; 1994–1999	Constituency abolished
