= Rupert Allason =

British politician

Member of Parliament for Torbay
- In office 11 June 1987 – 8 April 1997
- Preceded by: Frederic Bennett
- Succeeded by: Adrian Sanders

Personal details
- Born: Rupert William Simon Allason; 8 November 1951 (age 74) London, England
- Party: Conservative
- Education: Downside School
- Occupation: Author and MP

Rupert William Simon Allason (born 8 November 1951) is a British former Conservative Party politician and author. He was the Member of Parliament (MP) for Torbay in Devon, from 1987 to 1997. He writes books and articles on the subject of espionage under the pen name Nigel West.

== Background ==
Born in London, Allason and his brother, Julian, were brought up as Roman Catholics, the faith of their Irish mother, Nuala (who acted under the names Nuala McElveen and Nuala Barrie), daughter of John A. McArevey, of Foxrock, Dublin. The boys attended Downside School. Their father, James Allason, was also a Conservative Party MP, descended from the architect Thomas Allason.

== Political career ==
Allason contested Kettering in 1979 and Battersea in 1983 before being elected as Conservative MP for Torbay in 1987.

He was opposed to integration with the European Union; in 1993 he was the only Conservative to refuse to vote for the Maastricht Treaty when it was made into a motion of confidence. The vote was narrowly won, but Allason's abstention caused him to have the party whip withdrawn for a year.

He left parliament after the landslide 1997 general election in which he lost his seat to Liberal Democrat Adrian Sanders. His margin of defeat was just twelve votes, one of the narrowest election margins since 1945. It was reported that Allason had failed to tip a pub waitress a week before polling day, and that as a consequence, fourteen waiters who were going to vote for him switched to the Liberal Democrats.

In 2000, Allason was reported to have considered joining the UK Independence Party (UKIP). Author Jon Ronson, in the first chapter of his book Them: Adventures with Extremists, briefly analysed Allason's career and character, with particular emphasis on his 1997 electoral loss.

== Literary career ==
As an author, Allason has concentrated on security and intelligence issues. He was voted 'The Experts' Expert' by a panel of other spy writers in The Observer in November 1989. In 1984 The Sunday Times commented: "His information is so precise that many people believe he is the unofficial historian of the secret services. West's sources are undoubtedly excellent. His books are peppered with deliberate clues to potential front-page stories."

Allason has been a frequent speaker at intelligence seminars and has lectured at both the KGB headquarters in Dzerzhinsky Square, Moscow; and at the CIA headquarters in Langley, Virginia, where he once addressed an audience that included the Soviet spy Aldrich Ames. He continues to lecture to members of the intelligence community at the Centre for Counterintelligence and Security Studies in Washington, D.C.

His special contribution to the study of modern historical espionage has been in tracking down former agents and persuading them to tell their stories. He traced the wartime double agent GARBO, who was reported to have died in Africa in 1949. However, Allason found him in Venezuela, and they collaborated on the book Operation Garbo, published in 1985.

He was also the first person to identify and interview the mistress of Admiral Canaris, the German intelligence chief who headed the Abwehr, and he was responsible for the exposure of Leo Long and Edward Scott as Soviet spies.

His titles include The Crown Jewels, based on files made available to him by the KGB archives in Moscow; VENONA, which disclosed the existence of a GRU spy-ring operating in London throughout the war, allegedly headed by J. B. S. Haldane and Ivor Montagu; and The Third Secret, an account of the CIA's intervention in Afghanistan. Mortal Crimes, published in September 2004, investigates the scale of Soviet espionage in the Manhattan Project, the Anglo-American development of an atomic bomb.

In 2005 he edited The Guy Liddell Diaries, a daily journal of the wartime work of MI5's Director of Counter-Espionage. He also published a study of the Comintern's secret wireless traffic, MASK: MI5's Penetration of the Communist Party of Great Britain, and the first of a series of counter-intelligence textbooks, The Historical Dictionary of British Intelligence, The Historical Dictionary of International Intelligence and The Historical Dictionary of Cold War Counter-Intelligence.

In his 2018 book, Cold War Spymaster: A Legacy of Guy Liddell, Deputy Director of MI5, the author did not suggest that Liddell had passed secrets to the Soviets, as had been claimed by some other authors, including John Costello in his Mask of Treachery. In fact, Allason under the 'West' pseudonym stated that Liddell "was betrayed by Burgess, Blunt and Philby", according to a 2019 summary of the book.

== Legal actions ==
Allason has been involved in a number of legal cases, in each of which he represented himself without lawyers. While in the House of Commons, he campaigned against the use of public-interest immunity certificates, and exposed the arms-dealing activities of the publisher and fraudster Robert Maxwell. He was sued for libel by Maxwell but won the case, winning record damages for a litigant in person by counterclaim.

In 1996 Allason sued Alastair Campbell for malicious falsehood with regard to an article printed in the Daily Mirror in November 1992. The case was heard by Mr Justice Drake, without a jury. The judge ruled that Allason had failed to demonstrate that the Daily Mirror article, although inaccurate, had caused him any financial loss. In a retrial in 1998, he was awarded £1,050 in damages and 75% of his legal costs.

In 1998, Allason lost a libel action – his 18th – against the authors and publishers of the Have I Got News for You 1997 diary for referring to him as "a conniving little shit".

In 2001, Allason sued Random House, the publishers of The Enigma Spy, the autobiography of the former Soviet agent John Cairncross. Allason claimed he had ghostwritten The Enigma Spy in return for the copyright and 50 per cent of the proceeds. However, Allason lost the case and was ordered to pay costs of around £200,000. The trial judge, Mr Justice Laddie, described him as "one of the most dishonest witnesses I have ever seen."

== Honours and awards ==
Allason is the recipient of the US Association of Former Intelligence Officers (AFIO)'s Lifetime Literature Achievement Award, and in 2011 he was elected to the Honorary Board of that association. He is the European Editor of the World Intelligence Review, published in Washington, D.C.

== Personal life ==
In 1979 Allason married Nikki van Moppes. They divorced in 1996. The couple have two children. In 2012, he married violinist Nicola Loud.

== Publications ==
- Spy! (by Richard Deacon with Nigel West), London: British Broadcasting Corporation, 1980
- MI5: British Security Service Operations, 1909–1945, New York: Stein and Day, 1982, 1981
- A Matter of Trust: MI5, 1945–72, London: Weidenfeld & Nicolson, 1982; published in the U.S. as The Circus: MI5, Operations 1945–1972, New York : Stein and Day, 1983
- MI6: British Secret Intelligence Service Operations: 1909–45, London: Weidenfeld and Nicolson, 1983
- Unreliable Witness: Espionage Myths of the Second World War, London: Weidenfeld and Nicolson, 1984
- The Branch: A History of the Metropolitan Police Special Branch (By Rupert Allason)
- Operation Garbo: The Personal Story of the Most Successful Double Agent of World War II, co-written by Juan Pujol and Nigel West, London: Weidenfeld and Nicolson, 1985
- GCHQ: The Secret Wireless War, 1900–86, London: Weidenfeld and Nicolson, 1986, ISBN 0-297-78717-9
- Molehunt: The Full Story of the Soviet Spy in MI5, London: Weidenfeld and Nicolson, 1987
- The Friends: Britain's Post-War Secret Intelligence operations, London: Weidenfeld and Nicolson, 1988
- Games of Intelligence: The Classified Conflict of International Espionage, London: Weidenfeld and Nicolson, 1989
- The Blue List (novel), London: Secker & Warburg, 1989, ISBN 0-436-56602-8
- Cuban Bluff (novel), London: Secker & Warburg, 1990
- Seven Spies Who Changed the World, London: Secker & Warburg, 1991
- Secret War: The Story of SOE, Britain's Wartime Sabotage Organisation, London: Hodder & Stoughton, 1992
- Murder in the Commons (novel), London: 1992
- The Faber Book of Espionage: Faber & Faber, December 1994
- Murder in the Lords (novel), London: 1994
- The Secret War for the Falklands: SAS, MI6 and the War Whitehall Nearly Lost: Little Brown, January 1997, ISBN 0-7515-2071-3
- Introduction to British Security Co-ordination: British Intelligence in the Americas, 1940-45: Little Brown, 1998
- The Faber Book of Treachery: Faber & Faber, March 1998
- The Crown Jewels: The British Secrets Exposed by the KGB Archives, London: HarperCollins, 1999, 1998
- Counterfeit Spies: Time Warner Paperbacks, March 1999
- VENONA: The Greatest Secret of the Cold War: HarperCollins, May 2000 ISBN 0-00-653071-0
- The Third Secret: The CIA, Solidarity and the KGB's Plot to Kill the Pope: HarperCollins, October 2000
- Mortal Crimes: The Greatest Theft in History: Soviet Penetration of the Manhattan Project, New York: Enigma Books, 2004
- The Guy Liddell Diaries: 1939–1942 Volume 1: Frank Cass Publishers, February 2005
- The Guy Liddell Diaries: 1942–1945 Volume 2: Routledge, London, June 2005
- Historical Dictionary of British Intelligence: Scarecrow Press, London, June 2005
- Mask: MI5's Penetration of the Communist Party of Great Britain: Frank Cass Publishers, July 2005
- On Her Majesty's Secret Service: The Chiefs of Britain's Intelligence Agency, MI6: Greenhill Books, London October 2006
- Double Cross in Cairo: The true story of the spy who turned the tide of war in the Middle East. London: Biteback Publishing. 2015. ISBN 978-1-84954-796-3.
- Classified! The Adventures of a Molehunter: Biteback Publishing, London, February 2024 ISBN 9781785908538

Parliament of the United Kingdom
Preceded by Frederic Bennett	Member of Parliament for Torbay; 1987–1997	Succeeded by Adrian Sanders
