= Counteraction principle =

Legal principle related to intellectual property

The counteraction principle or counteraction theory is a legal principle which relates to the use of intellectual property where two marks are phonetically similar and where such a situation could lead to public confusion between brands.

== Relevant issues ==
Holders of trademarks are able to contest the registration of similar trademarks on multiple grounds; one of which is public confusion. On the basis of public confusion, the counteraction principle (in essence) will not hinder companies using trademarks which are similar to those of famous marks. This is because most famous marks are likely to be easily identifiable, and therefore not likely to lead to confusion from the general public.

== Relevant cases ==
=== Ruiz-Picasso and Others v OHIM ===
In Ruiz-Picasso and Others v OHIM [2006] ECR I-643, the estate of Pablo Picasso argued that Daimler Chrysler infringed upon the Picasso trademark when it licensed PSA Peugeot Citroën to use the trademark "Picaro" on one its models. The estate argued that "Picaro" was too similar to "Picasso" and would cause public confusion. After being defeated in lower European courts, the appeal was dismissed in the European Court of Justice.

=== Les Éditions Albert René Sàrl v Office for Harmonisation in the Internal Market, Orange A/S ===
In Les Éditions Albert René Sàrl v Office for Harmonisation in the Internal Market, Orange A/S, the applicants claimed that Community Trade Mark protection for Mobilix would risk confusing consumers on the basis that the trademarks were phonetically similar. OHIM accepted the registration of the mark on the basis that everyone knew the fictional character Obelix. The OHIM Board of Appeal allowed for opposition by the Paris-based publisher of the Obelix character for classes 9 and 35 of the Madrid System. However, for all other classes the appeal was dismissed, as the General Court (European Union) concluded that there should be no confusion over such a popular character.

== See also ==
- Confusing similarity
