= Steve Darling =

British politician (born 1969)

Councillor Steve Darling MP
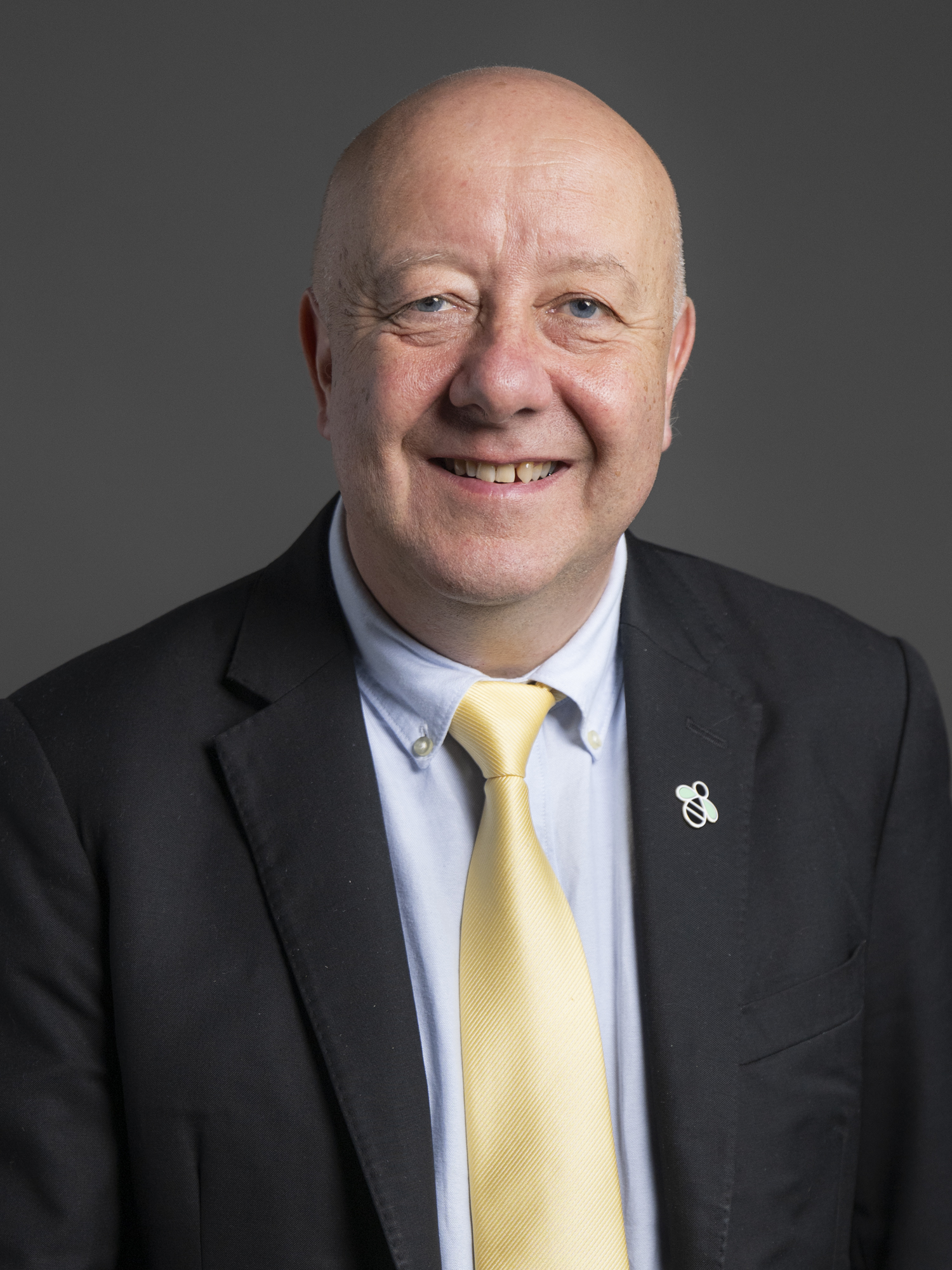
- Official portrait, 2024

Member of Parliament for Torbay
- Incumbent
- Assumed office 4 July 2024
- Preceded by: Kevin Foster
- Majority: 5,349 (11.6%)

Liberal Democrat spokesperson on Work and Pensions
- Incumbent
- Assumed office October 2024
- Leader: Ed Davey
- Preceded by: Wendy Chamberlain

Member of Torbay Council (Note: Torbay Borough Council until 1 April 1998) for Barton with Watcombe Watcombe (2003–2019) Shiphay (1995–2003)
- Incumbent
- Assumed office 8 May 1995

Leader of Torbay Council
- In office 28 May 2019 – 16 May 2023
- Preceded by: Office established (Note: Gordon Oliver served as the directly elected executive mayor of Torbay until the office was abolished in 2019.)
- Succeeded by: David Thomas

Personal details
- Born: Stephen Matthew Darling; 1969 (age 56–57) Birmingham, England
- Party: Liberal Democrats

Stephen Matthew Darling (born 1969) is a British Liberal Democrat politician who has served as Member of Parliament (MP) for Torbay since 2024. A member of Torbay Council since 1995, he also served as the council's leader from 2019 to 2023. Darling is registered blind and is supported by a guide dog named Jennie.

== Political career ==
Darling was first elected to Torbay Borough Council in 1995 for the ward of Shiphay. When the council became a unitary authority as Torbay Council in 1998, Darling was re-elected as a councillor for Shiphay in 1997 and 2000. He represented the ward of Watcombe following the reorganisation of ward boundaries in 2003, and has represented Barton with Watcombe since a further change in ward boundaries in 2019. Darling served as the leader of Torbay Council from 28 May 2019 to 16 May 2023. In 2023, when Darling was leader of the Council, the Local Government Chronicle awarded the Council "most improved Council of the year" due to a firmer grip on finances and children's services going from failing to good within two years following an Ofsted inspection.

Darling worked through the tenure of prior Liberal Democrat MP Adrian Sanders, Torbay MP from 1997 to 2015. Darling was employed in Sanders's constituency office as a caseworker, and later as a senior caseworker, during Sanders's time in office.

In 2024, Darling was selected as the Liberal Democrat candidate for the constituency of Torbay at the 2024 United Kingdom general election. At the general election, Darling gained the seat from Foster, winning with a majority of 5,349 and overturning the prior majority of 17,749.

== Personal life ==
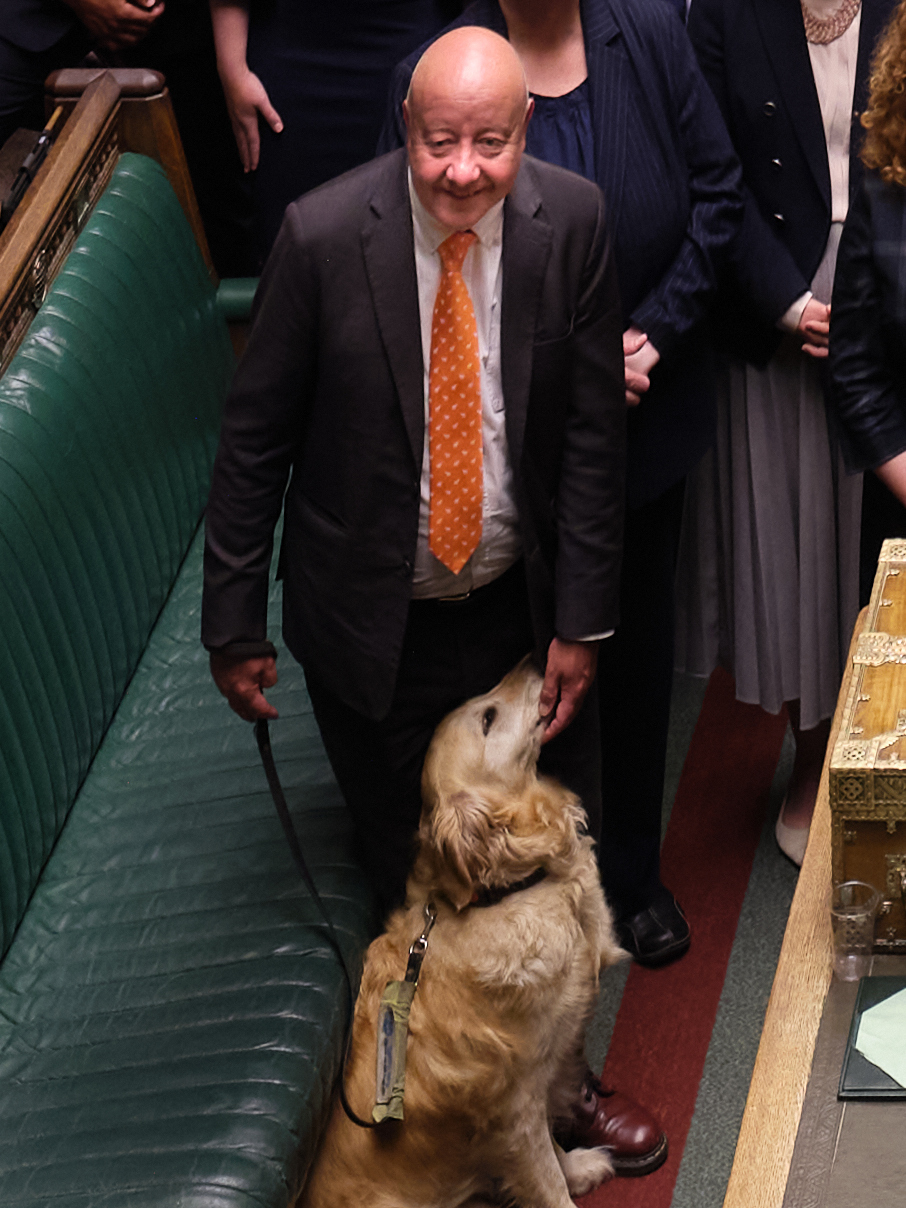
Darling with his guide dog Jennie in Parliament in July 2024

In 1969, Darling was adopted in Birmingham at three months old, and moved to Torquay in Devon at the age of 18 months. He traced his birth family in the 2000s and discovered that a number of them lived nearby in Devon.

Darling has Stargardt disease, a genetic eye condition that causes his vision to be "a bit like looking through frosted glass". He is aided by his guide dog Jennie, who is three-quarters Golden Retriever and one-quarter Labrador. He is one of at least three disabled MPs who were first elected in 2024, alongside Labour MPs Marie Tidball and Jen Craft.

In September 2023, Jennie was attacked by an XL Bully dog in Torbay and recovered from the attack. She is not the first guide dog to serve in Westminster, as House of Lords members Baron Blunkett and Baron Holmes of Richmond also use guide dogs in the chamber.

In September 2025, Jennie won the popular vote of Westminster Dog of the Year, a competition run by the Dogs Trust and the Kennel Club. Darling is now Work & Pensions spokesperson for the Liberal Democrats and was appointed in September 2024. He sits on the Department for Work and Pensions Select Committee and chairs the Defibrillators APPG and Access to Work APPG. Darling has also sat on the following Bill Committees: Employment Rights Bill, Public Authorities (Fraud, Error and Recovery) Bill, and Pension Schemes Bill. Darling has also supported two parliamentary delegations to Ukraine in February 2025 and 2026 to commemorate the invasion of Ukraine by Russia.

Darling's wife, Mandy, is also registered blind and has served as a Torbay councillor. They have two sons.

== Notes ==
Parliament of the United Kingdom
Preceded by Kevin Foster	Member of Parliament for Torbay; 2024–present	Incumbent
