= Richard Huggett (political candidate) =

British former teacher (born 1944)

Richard John Huggett (born January 1944) is a British former teacher who has been a candidate in a number of elections, using descriptions which were similar to those of established political parties, leading to this practice being outlawed under the Registration of Political Parties Act 1998.

== Background ==
Huggett studied psychology and zoology at the University of London and obtained a diploma in social and administrative studies. He lived for about 10 years in the South of France where he built yachts. Huggett was reported to have been an intelligence officer, who from 1989 ran a school in Hampshire, which closed down when the lease on its premises expired.

== 1994 European Parliament election ==
At the European Parliament Election, 1994, Huggett was nominated under the label "Literal Democrat" for the Devon and East Plymouth seat. He ran his campaign from Canonteign Manor, the home he shared with his mother near Christow in the Teign valley in Devon. In an interview recorded during the campaign but due to be broadcast after it Huggett hinted that future government should be conducted through electronic referendums and said "the traditional party system generates all sorts of undemocratic processes."

When the nominations closed and it was revealed that Huggett was a candidate with the description "Literal Democrat", the Liberal Democrats launched legal action in the High Court of Justice alleging that the Returning Officer had wrongly accepted a nomination which was designed to confuse voters. The Judge ruled that the nomination had to stand. In the result, Huggett won over 10,000 votes, far more than the 700 vote majority of the Conservative candidate over the Liberal Democrat.

== Winchester constituency ==
Huggett also attempted to run as "Gerald Maclone" in the Winchester constituency in the 1997 general election and the following by-election (the sitting MP was junior minister Gerry Malone). He stood under his own name as "Liberal Democrat Top Choice for Parliament" in the general election, winning 640 votes in a contest that was decided by just 2 votes. The result was annulled in court, and Huggett stood as "Literal Democrat Mark Here to Win" in the ensuing by-election.
