= Adrian Sanders =

British politician

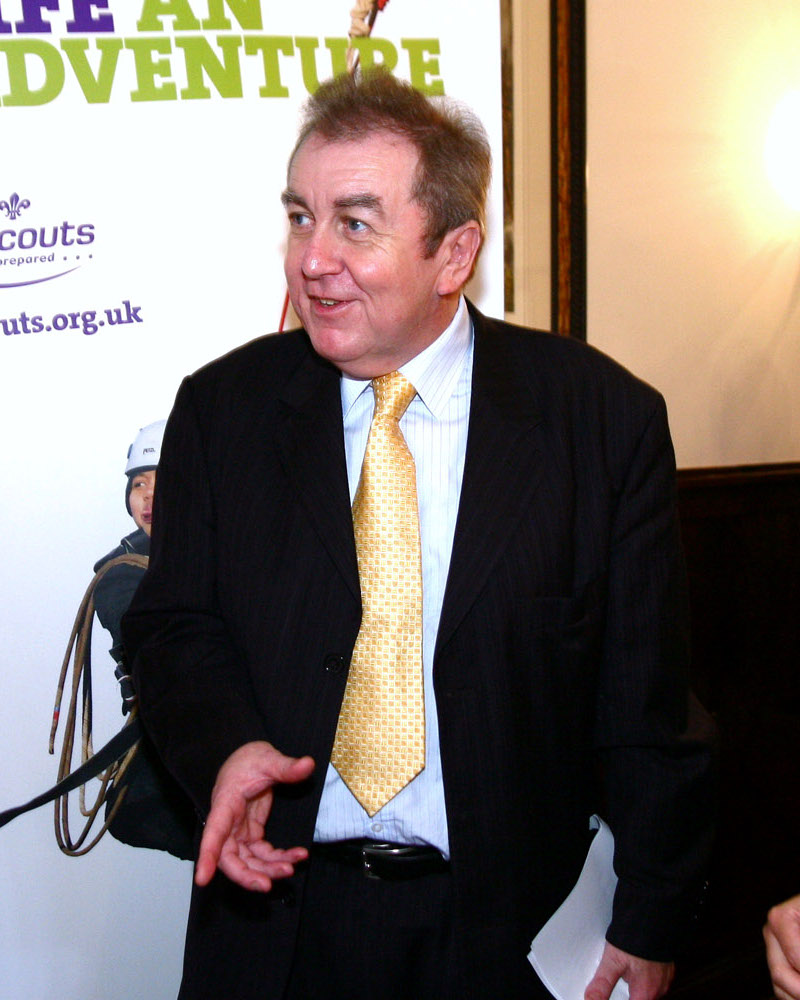
- Sanders in 2009

Liberal Democrat Deputy Chief Whip
- In office 10 March 2006 – 1 June 2010 Serving with Jenny Willott (2006-2007)
- Succeeded by: Alistair Carmichael (as Government Deputy Chief Whip)

Shadow Spokesperson for Communities and Local Government
- In office 1 June 2001 – 1 June 2002

Opposition Whip
- In office 1 May 1997 – 1 June 2001

Shadow Spokesperson for Environment, Food, Rural Affairs, Communities and Local Government
- In office 1 May 1997 – 1 June 2001

Member of Parliament for Torbay
- In office 1 May 1997 – 30 March 2015
- Preceded by: Rupert Allason
- Succeeded by: Kevin Foster

Personal details
- Born: Adrian Mark Sanders; 25 April 1959 (age 67) Paignton, Devon, England
- Party: Liberal Democrats
- Spouse: Alison Sanders
- Profession: Politician
- Website: Adrian Sanders MP

Adrian Mark Sanders (born 25 April 1959) is a Liberal Democrat politician in the United Kingdom. He was the Member of Parliament (MP) for Torbay in Devon from 1997 until his defeat in the 2015 general election.

== Early life ==
Sanders is the son of the late John and Helen Sanders, an insurance official and nurse respectively. He went to primary schools in Paignton and Torquay then Torquay Boys' Grammar School. He worked briefly in a timber yard, then in the insurance industry for seven years, and then had a short spell of unemployment before finding work in the political arena.

== Political career ==
Sanders joined the Liberal Party in 1979 and in 1985 was elected vice president of the National League of Young Liberals. He was a Torbay Borough councillor 1984–86. From 1986 to 1989 he lived in Hebden Bridge, West Yorkshire, working for the Association of Liberal Democrat Councilors before moving back to Paignton in 1990.

During 1992-93, Sanders worked in the office of Paddy Ashdown, the leader of the Liberal Democrats, and organised the 'Beyond Westminster' Tour. He then moved to become a policy officer at the National Council for Voluntary Organisations (1993–94) and then the Southern Association of Voluntary Action Groups for Europe.

Sanders stood unsuccessfully for the seat of Torbay 1992 general election, reducing the Conservative majority from 8,820 to 5,787. In the 1994 European Election, he unsuccessfully stood for the Devon and East Plymouth constituency, the loss was partly blamed on one of the candidates, Richard Huggett, standing with the description 'Literal' Democrat.

At the 1997 general election, Sanders stood in Torbay, successfully, defeating the Conservative incumbent Rupert Allason by 12 votes. At the 2001 general election, his majority was 6,708; at the 2005 general election, it was 2,029 and it was 4,078 at the 2010 general election.

Following the 2001 election, Sanders was made the Liberal Democrat spokesman for tourism, and was subsequently moved to the position of Deputy Chief Whip of the Party in Parliament. In the 2006 leadership contest Sanders nominated Menzies Campbell. In the December 2007 leadership election Sanders remained neutral by not publicly backing any candidate, citing his position as Deputy Chief Whip. He wrote afterwards that he had voted for Chris Huhne.

Sanders was awarded the Diabetes UK 75th Anniversary Award at a ceremony in the House of Commons on Wednesday 21 January 2009. In July 2010, he received the League Against Cruel Sports’ Parliamentarian of the Year Award.

In April 2009, Sanders appeared in The Sunday Telegraph list of best value MPs. At the height of the expenses scandal, he opened his complete 'unredacted' expenses file to his local newspaper, the Herald Express.

In October 2011, he voted for a backbench motion to hold a referendum on Britain's membership of the European Union, along with 110 other MPs in the House of Commons. He was the only Liberal Democrat MP to do so. Sanders said he was also probably the only supporter of the EU to do so, but believed it was "a liberal principle to trust the people"

In May 2012, Sanders was the one Liberal Democrat on the Commons culture, media and sport select committee on phone hacking and provided the swing vote on the release of a report. Sanders joined with the five Labour committee members and against the four Conservative members to support the report which said in part that Rupert Murdoch was "'not fit' to run an international company".

In March 2015, Queen guitarist Brian May launched the "Common Decency" campaign, naming Sanders alongside six other candidates, saying: "We think you’re decent people, we think you represent your constituents and your conscience so we’re going to tell our people to try and cluster round and give you support."

At the 2015 general election, Sanders lost his seat to the Conservative Party candidate Kevin Foster by a majority of 3,286.

On 5 November 2015, Sanders was elected as the Liberal Democrat councillor for the Clifton-with-Maidenway ward of Paignton, taking almost 70 per cent of the vote.

== Personal life ==
Sanders is married to Alison and lives in Paignton. He has had Type 1 diabetes since 1990 and campaigns on issues relating to diabetes. He is a fan of rock music, and occasionally presents a rock show on local radio station Palm 105.5. He is also a supporter of Torquay United.

Parliament of the United Kingdom
Preceded by Rupert Allason	Member of Parliament for Torbay; 1997–2015	Succeeded by Kevin Foster
