= Registration of Political Parties Act 1998 =

Act of the Parliament of the United Kingdom

Registration of Political Parties Act 1998 (Note: Section 24.)
- Act of Parliament
- Parliament of the United Kingdom
- Long title: An Act to make provision about the registration of political parties.
- Citation: 1998 c. 48
- Territorial extent: United Kingdom (Note: Section 26.)

Dates
- Royal assent: 19 November 1998
- Commencement: Various (Note: Section 25.)
Other legislation
Amends	European Parliamentary Elections Act 1978; Representation of the People Act 1983; Companies Act 1985; Broadcasting Act 1990; Criminal Justice and Public Order Act 1994; Deregulation and Contracting Out Act 1994; Government of Wales Act 1998
Amended by	Political Parties, Elections and Referendums Act 2000

Status: Amended

Text of statute as originally enacted

Revised text of statute as amended

The Registration of Political Parties Act 1998 (c. 48) is an act of the Parliament of the United Kingdom which made legal provision to set up a register of political parties in the United Kingdom. Previously there had been no such register, and political parties were not specially recognised.

The legislation was introduced for a variety of reasons. It was planned to introduce some elements of list-based proportional representation in elections to the Scottish Parliament and Welsh Assembly and also to introduce full list-based proportional representation in European Parliament elections in England, Scotland and Wales and for that, political parties needed to have a stronger legal recognition. Additionally, various pieces of legislation needed to refer to parties and so were using ad hoc definitions, which might have been incompatible.

Another motivation was the use of the names Literal Democrats, Conversative Party, and Labor Party by people in elections in the 1990s; these names were criticised as potentially confusing with the names of the three major parties in the UK (the Liberal Democrats, the Conservative Party and the Labour Party, respectively). In the 1994 European Elections, Richard Huggett stood as a Literal Democrat candidate for the Devon and East Plymouth seat, taking more votes than the Conservative Party margin over the Liberal Democrats, leading to a legal challenge by the Liberal Democrat candidate.

Candidates for election could no longer be described as an "Independent Conservative" or "Independent Liberal" on a ballot paper, as the 1998 Act prohibits any description which could cause confusion with a registered political party. In practice, the description used is either the name of a registered party or the word "Independent".

The legislation therefore introduced a register of political parties and included provisions to prohibit "confusion" with already-existing parties, names that were more than six words, or were "obscene or offensive".

As the act also permitted logos on ballot papers, the act also introduced a similar register for emblems, which had the result that the Communist Party of Britain is the only party in the United Kingdom permitted to use the hammer and sickle as its ballot-paper logo, although they usually use the hammer and dove variant. Parties may register more than one emblem, or none at all; most have two or three.

The act was amended by the Political Parties, Elections and Referendums Act 2000 (2000 c. 41) to change the registration authority to the Electoral Commission from "the registrar or other officer who performs the duty of registration of companies in England and Wales under the Companies Act 1985".
