= Economy of Devon =

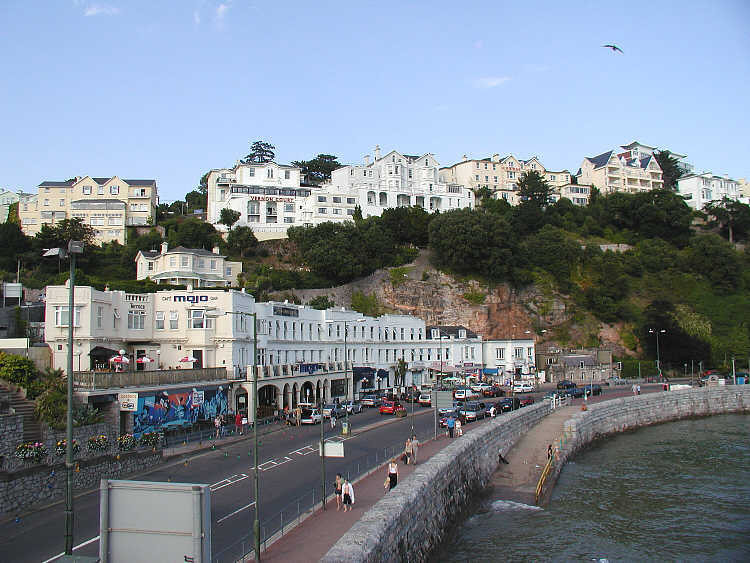
Part of the seafront of Torquay, south Devon, at high tide

Devon has the 19th largest economy in England out of 46 ceremonial counties. Situated in the region of South West England, it is a maritime county. Like neighbouring Cornwall to the west, Devon is disadvantaged economically compared to other parts of southern England, owing to the decline of a number of core industries, notably fishing, mining and farming. Consequently, most of Devon has qualified for the European Community's Objective 2 status, particularly around Exmoor, Bideford Bay and the Hartland Point peninsula which is somewhat cut off from industrial Britain due to poor road and rail transport links. These areas of North Devon are, however, only around 50 miles (80 km) by boat from Swansea in Wales. A proposal which has the backing of both the Welsh Assembly Government and the South West Regional Assembly, as well as Devon County Council, is a year-round ferry service from either Ilfracombe or Bideford to Swansea, which it is hoped would stimulate economic growth in both south-west Wales and the north coasts of Devon and Cornwall.

The 2001 UK foot and mouth crisis harmed the farming community severely.

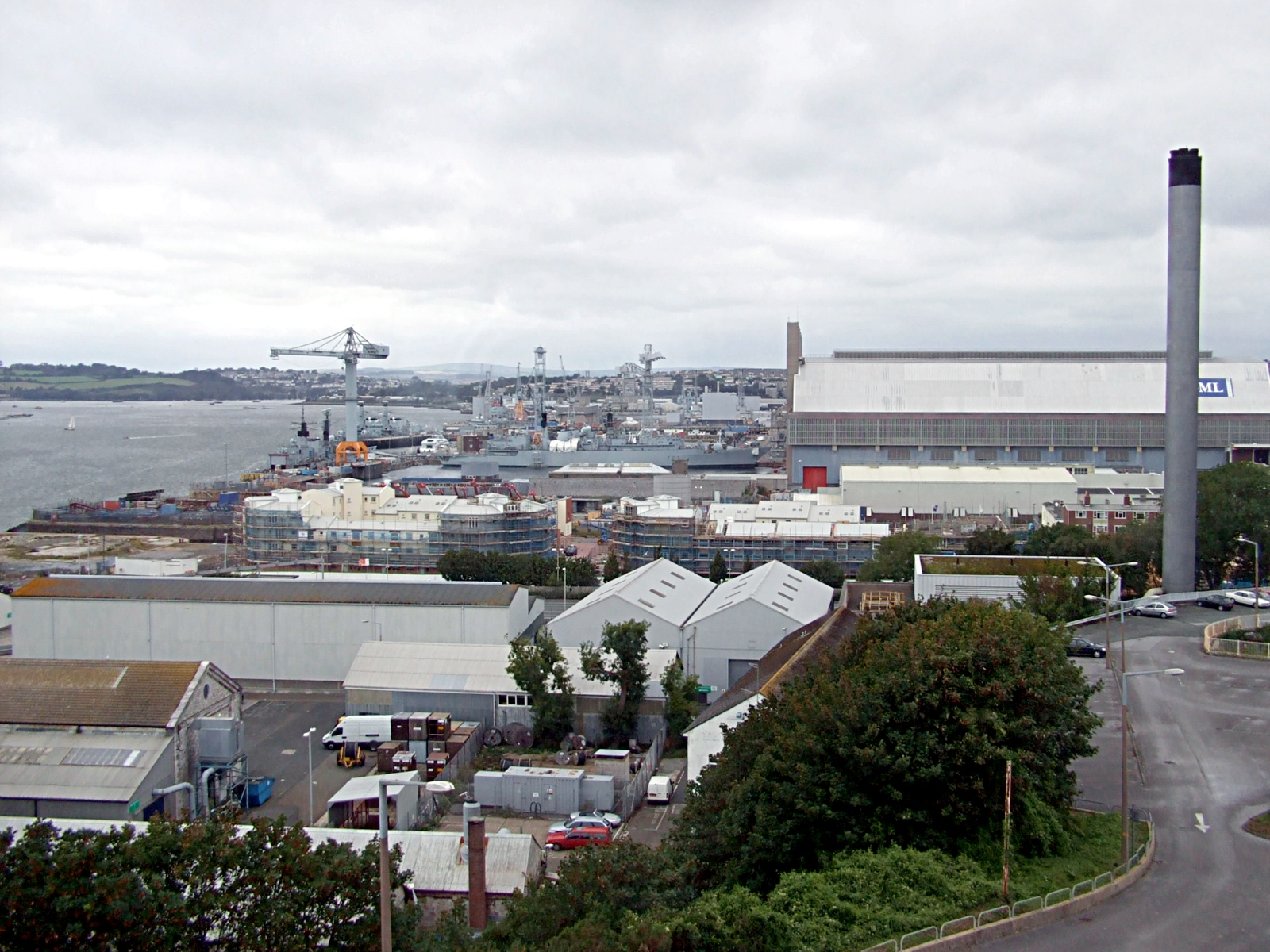
View of HMNB Devonport, the naval base in Plymouth

Since the rise of seaside resorts with the arrival of the railways in the 19th century, Devon's economy has been heavily reliant on tourism. The county's economy has followed the declining trend of British seaside resorts since the mid 20th century, with some recent revival. This revival has been aided by the designation of much of Devon's countryside and coastline as the Dartmoor and Exmoor national parks, and the Jurassic Coast and Cornwall and West Devon Mining Landscape World Heritage Sites. In 2004 the county's tourist revenue was £1.2 billion.

The Met Office is in Exeter as is Connaught plc, and Pennon Group, the water company. The Wrigley Company (chewing gum) and HMNB Devonport (the largest naval base in western Europe) are in Plymouth. Torquay was home to Beverage Brands, the producers of WKD Original Vodka. Britannia Royal Naval College is at Dartmouth.

== Long established industries ==
Mining for tin and copper was carried on in Devon from ancient times until the 1930s: see Dartmoor tin-mining. Agriculture has been an important industry in South West England since the 19th century: approximately 80% of land in the South West of England is in agricultural use (19.6% of England's total).

In the later 19th and early 20th centuries there were a number of potteries in the county, mainly based around Torquay in the south (for instance Aller Vale Pottery), and Barnstaple in the north. At first these made high-quality art pottery, but later declined to the manufacture of mass-produced mottoware for the tourist industry.

== Statistics ==
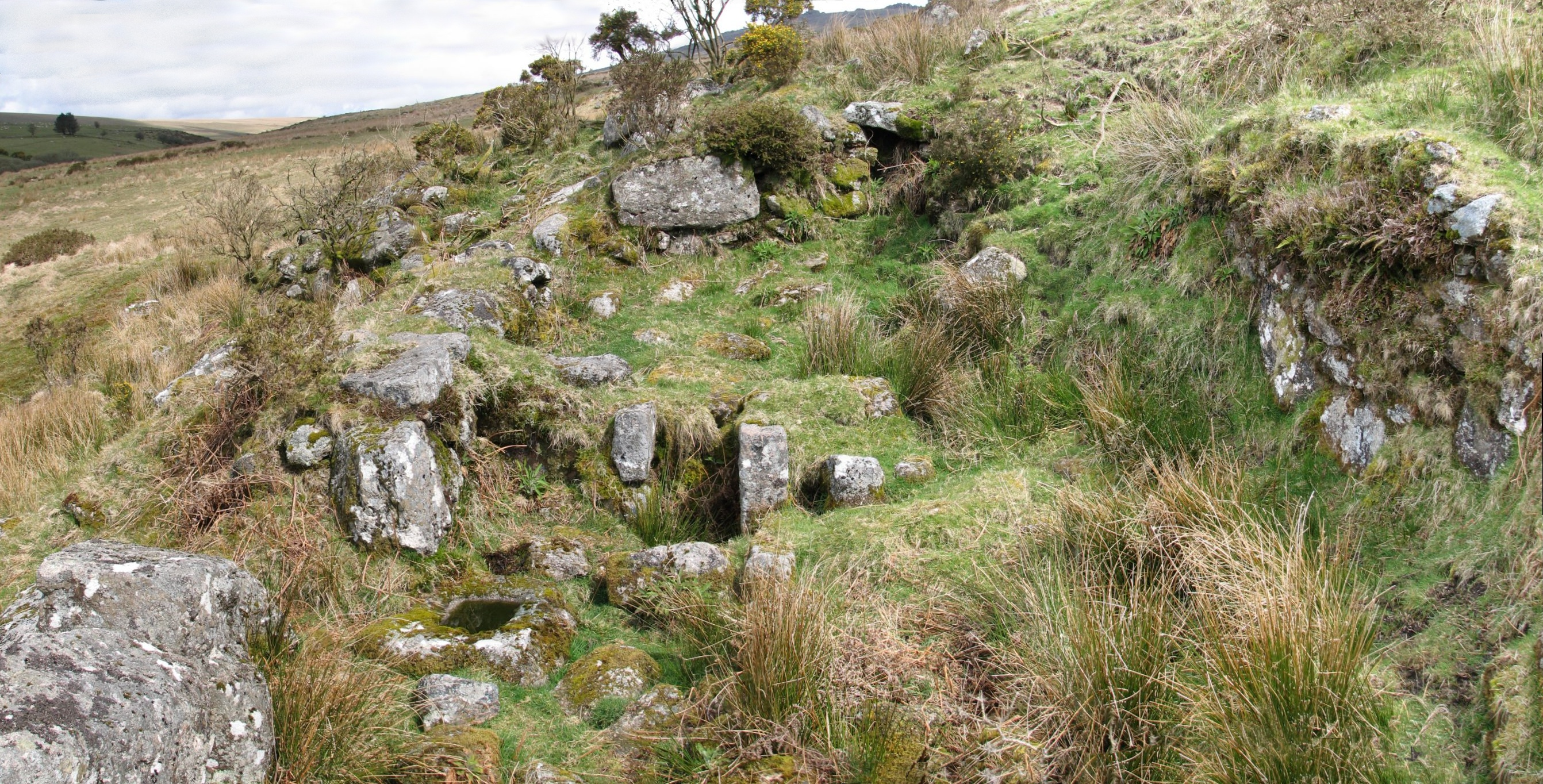
The remains of a Dartmoor blowing house, showing the furnace and mouldstone

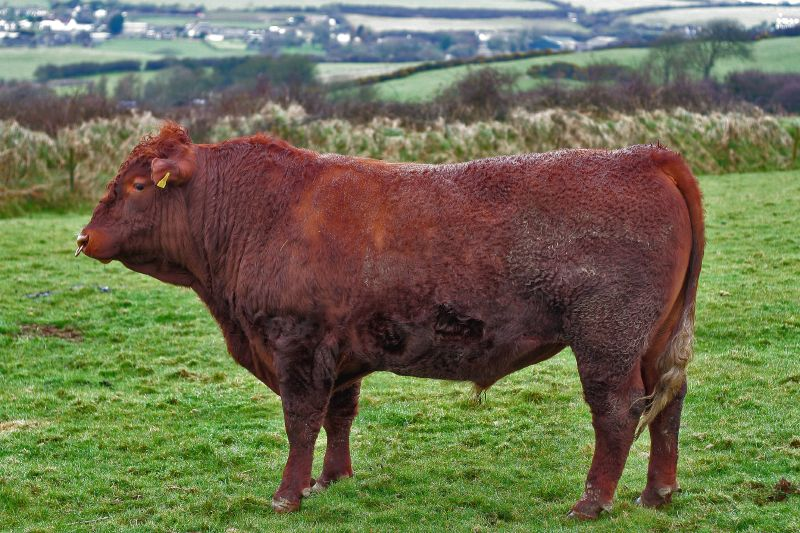
A Red Devon (North Devon) bull

This is a chart of trend of regional gross value added of Devon at current basic prices published (pp. 240–253) by Office for National Statistics with figures in millions of pounds.

| Year | Regional Gross Value Added | Agriculture | Industry | Services< |
|---|---|---|---|---|
| 1995 | 6,163 | 391 | 1,746 | 4,027 |
| 2000 | 7,497 | 286 | 1,813 | 5,398 |
| 2003 | 8,670 | 325 | 1,853 | 6,492 |
