= Princess Theatre (Torquay) =

Theatre in Devon, England

Princess Theatre, Torquay
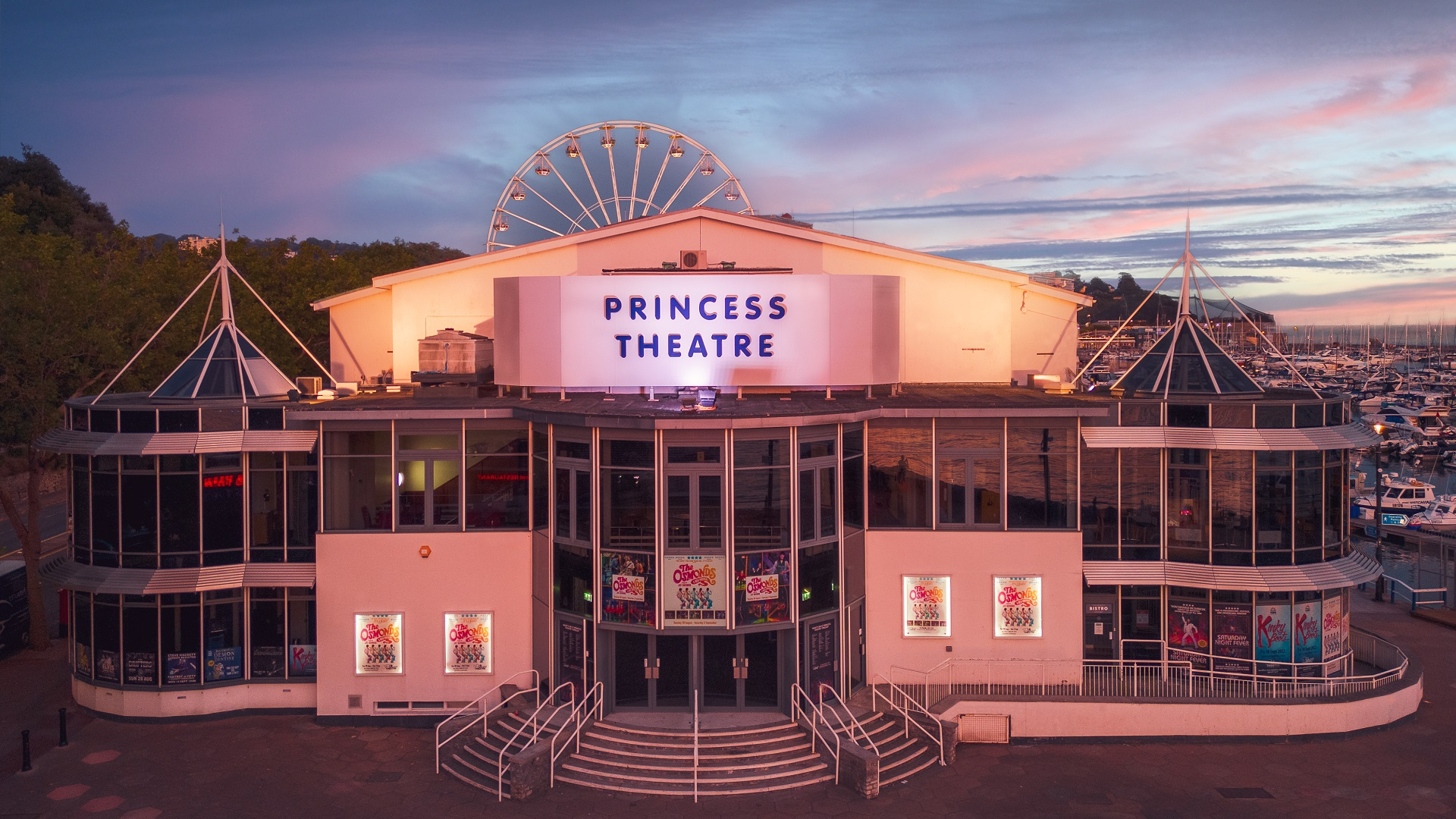
- Princess Theatre, Torquay
- Interactive map of Princess Theatre, Torquay
- Address: Torbay Road; Torquay, TQ2 5EZ 01803206360; United Kingdom
- Coordinates: 50.4613°N 3.5301°W
- Owner: Torbay Council
- Operator: ATG Entertainment
- Capacity: 1,514 on 2 levels
- Type: Regional theatre
- Production: Touring Productions
- Public transit: Torquay railway station

Construction
- Opened: 7 June 1961; 65 years ago
- Years active: 65

Website
- www.atgtickets.com/torquay

The Princess Theatre in Torquay, England is a 1,514 seat theatre that first opened its doors on Wednesday 7 June 1961. Top of the bill on opening night were Tommy Cooper and Morecambe & Wise.

The theatre is a touring house which means it doesn't produce but receives touring productions. It stages a variety of productions including opera, ballet, concerts, West End musicals and a Christmas pantomime.

The theatre was built by Torbay Council as the main feature of the redevelopment of the Princess Gardens area on Torquay seafront. The theatre replaced a marquee which was erected annually to house light entertainment.

Theatres in seaside resorts were traditionally known for their annual Summer Season consisting of light entertainment and family variety shows and Torquay was no exception. In the past the Princess Theatre has staged summer shows from Joe Pasquale, Bradley Walsh, Ken Dodd, Danny La Rue and Jimmy Tarbuck. More recently comedians Michael McIntyre, Jack Dee, Katherine Ryan, Dawn French and Russell Howard have graced the stage.

Artists including Billy Ocean, Paloma Faith, Don McLean, Level 42, Alfie Boe and Blue (English group) have performed at the venue as part of their UK tours.

The theatre has become a favourite for UK touring productions and has welcomed Chicago, The Play That Goes Wrong, We Will Rock You, Heathers: The Musical, Fawlty Towers: The Play and Six.

The venue is owned by Torbay Council and operated by ATG Entertainment.
