= Mottoware =

Mottoware or motto ware refers to pottery decorated with text, such as:

- Measham#Measham teapots
- Torquay pottery
