= Soft market test =

Purchasing exercise to test a market

A soft market test is a procurement exercise designed to test commercial markets' capabilities of meeting a set of requirements which would include enough interested suppliers to maintain competitive pressures. The exercise is unlikely to result immediately in an order for goods and services: more likely is that the outcome of the exercise will enable the purchasing business to refine its requirements and approach to market in order to then invite businesses to quote.

Soft market testing may be used by public sector organisations to explore potential roles for the private sector, test some of the commercial principles being considered, and understand the likely interest from industry.

== Examples ==
- Plymouth City Council undertook soft market testing for residual waste services in early 2008 in partnership with Torbay Council and Devon County Council, with a view to formally procuring services later in 2008 and awarding a contract in late 2010.
- North Somerset Council undertook soft market testing in 2010 in order to seek out a partner capable of delivering improved support services at a reduced cost.
- The UK's Defence Infrastructure Organisation (DIO) undertook soft market testing in 2012 to identify a number of different strategic business models that the organisation could potentially adopt.
- Sheffield City Council undertook soft market testing for overnight short breaks services for adults with learning disabilities in 2015.
