= Torquay =

Town in Devon, England

Coordinates: 50.47°N 3.53°W

- Seaside town
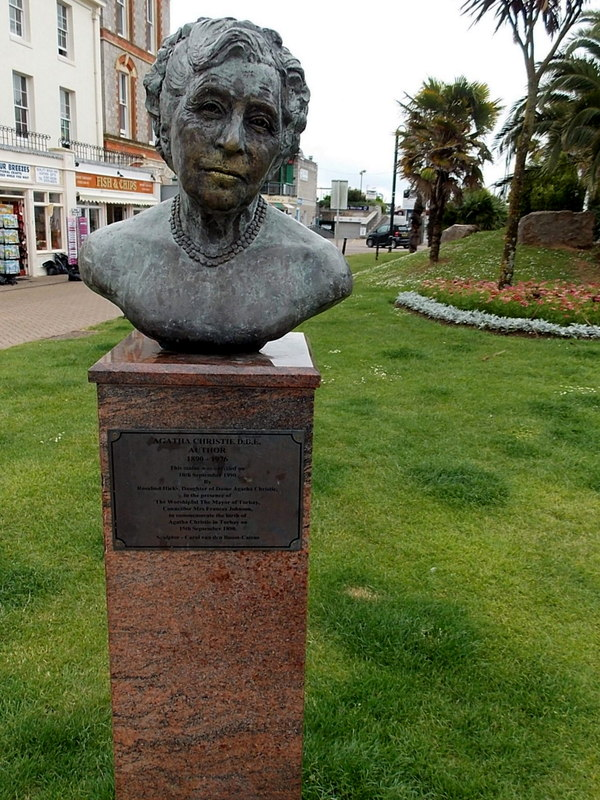
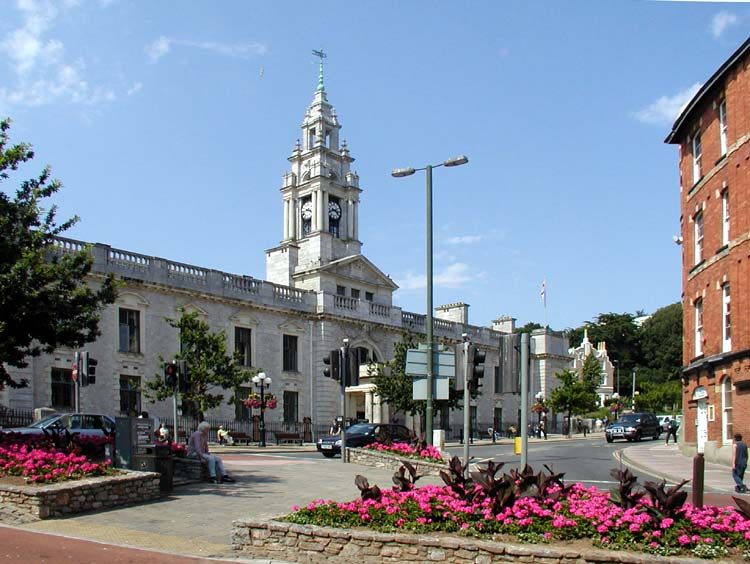
- Torquay Harbour Princess Gardens Torre Abbey Thatcher Point Agatha Christie statue Torquay Town Hall

- Location within Devon
- Population: 52,037 (2021 Census)
- OS grid reference: SX915655
- Unitary authority: Torbay
- Ceremonial county: Devon
- Region: South West
- Country: England
- Sovereign state: United Kingdom
- Post town: TORQUAY
- Postcode district: TQ1, TQ2
- Dialling code: 01803
- Police: Devon and Cornwall
- Fire: Devon and Somerset
- Ambulance: South Western
- UK Parliament: Torbay

Torquay (/tɔːrˈkiː/ tor-KEE) is a seaside town in Devon, England, part of the unitary authority area of Torbay. It lies 18 miles (29 km) south of the county town of Exeter and 28 miles (45 km) east-north-east of Plymouth, on the north of Tor Bay, adjoining the neighbouring town of Paignton on the west of the bay and across from the fishing port of Brixham. At the 2021 census, the built-up area of Torquay had a population of 52,037.

The town's economy, like Brixham's, was initially based upon fishing and agriculture; however, in the early 19th century, it began to develop into a fashionable seaside resort. Later, as the town's fame spread, it was popular with Victorian society. Renowned for its mild climate, the town earned the nickname the English Riviera.

The writer Agatha Christie was born in the town and lived at Ashfield in Torquay during her early years. There is an "Agatha Christie Mile", a tour with plaques dedicated to her life and work. There is also a bronze head on Cary Green, opposite the Pavilion Theatre, as well as a seated statue, along with her dog, by the inner harbour.

The poet Elizabeth Barrett Browning lived in the town from 1837 to 1841. This was on the recommendation of her doctor in an attempt to cure her of a disease, thought likely to have been tuberculosis. Her former home now forms part of the Regina Hotel in Vaughan Parade.

== Name ==
Torquay's name originates in its being the quay of the ancient village of Torre. In turn, Torre takes its name from the tor, the extensively quarried remains of which can be seen by the town's Lymington Road. The original name was thus Torrequay, then Torkay, Torkey and Tor Quay, before the words were joined in Torquay.

== History ==
The area comprising modern Torquay has been inhabited since Paleolithic times. Hand axes found in Kents Cavern have been dated as 40,000 years old and a maxilla fragment, known as Kents Cavern 4, may be the oldest example of a modern human in Europe, dating back 37,000–40,000 years.

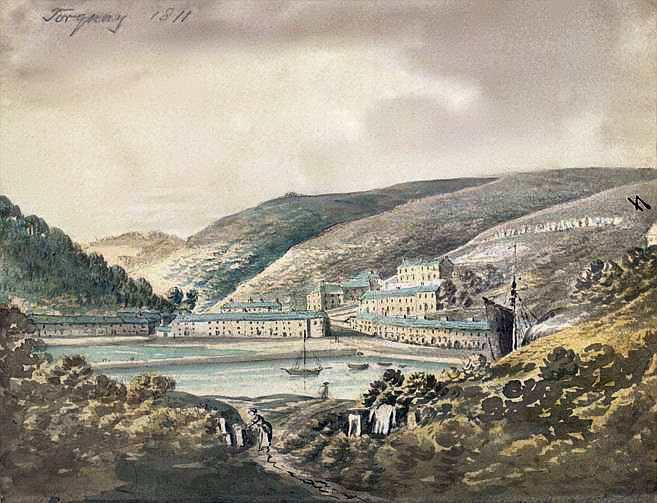
Torquay, 1811

Roman soldiers are known to have visited Torquay during the period when Britain was a part of the Roman Empire, leaving offerings at a curious rock formation in Kents Cavern, known as The Face.

The first major building in Torquay was Torre Abbey, a Premonstratensian monastery founded in 1196. Torquay remained a minor settlement until the Napoleonic Wars, when Torbay was used as a sheltered anchorage by the Channel Fleet, and relatives of officers often visited Torquay. The mild climate (for the UK) attracted many visitors who considered the town a convalescence retreat where they could recover from illness away from the cold and cloudy winters of more northerly or easterly locations. The population of Torquay grew rapidly from 838 in 1801, to 24,767 in 1887.

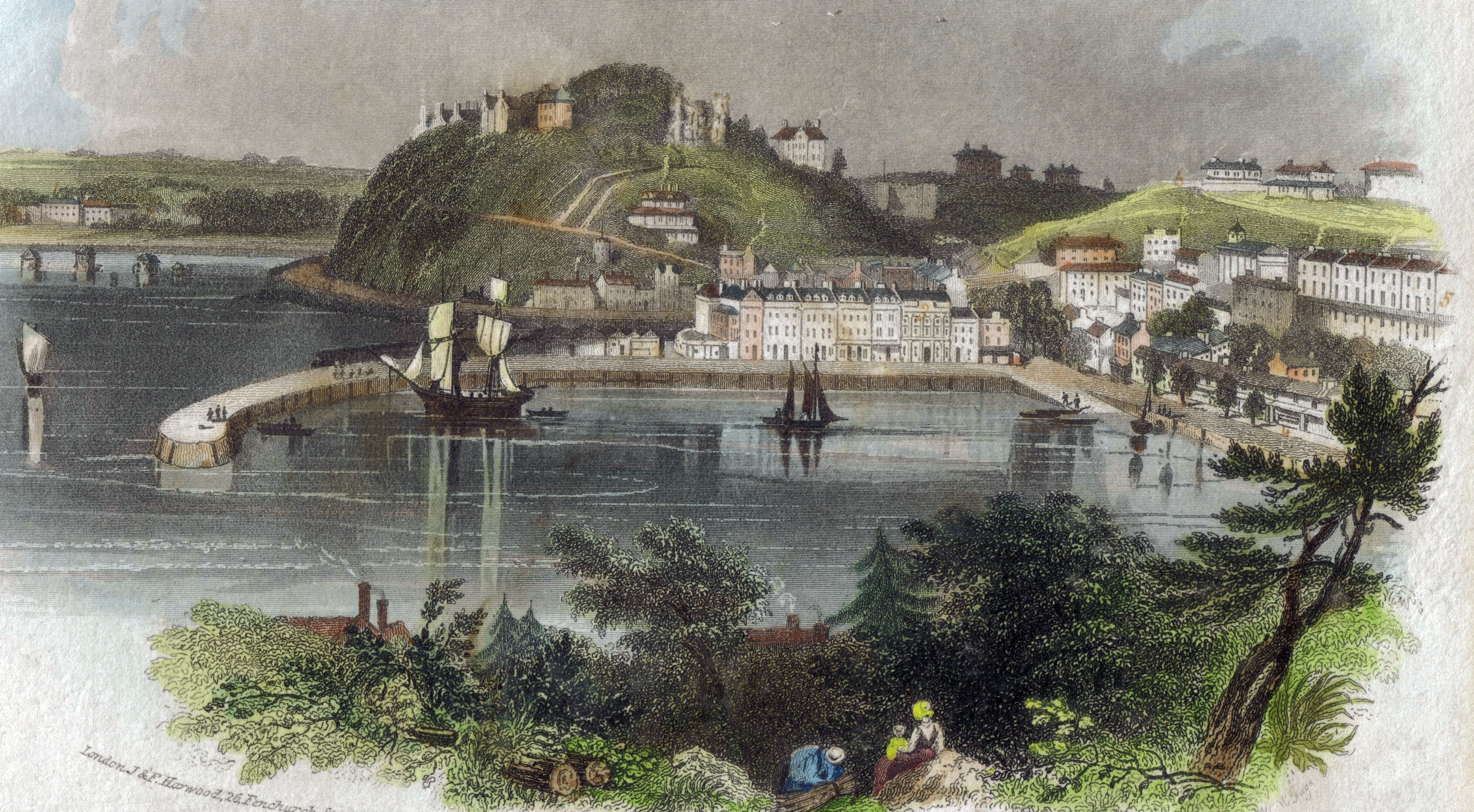
Torquay, 1842

The second phase in the expansion of Torquay began when Torre railway station was opened on 18 December 1848. The improved transport connections resulted in rapid growth at the expense of nearby towns not on Isambard Kingdom Brunel's railways. The more central Torquay railway station was opened on 2 August 1859 with views of the sea from the platforms. After the growth of the preceding decades, Torquay was granted borough status in 1892.

Torquay Tramways operated electric street trams from 1907. They were initially powered by the unusual Dolter stud-contact electrification so as not to disfigure the town with overhead wires but in 1911 the system was converted to more conventional overhead-line supply. The line was extended into Paignton in 1911 but the network was closed in 1934.

The Royal National Lifeboat Institution's Torquay Lifeboat Station was at the Ladies Bathing Cove from 1876 until 1923. A second lifeboat was kept at the harbour from 1917 until 1928. Torquay was regarded as a spa town after the Marine Spa was built on Beacon Hill near the harbour. Originally called the Bath Saloons complex, it had an open-air tide-filled swimming bath. The complex was opened in 1853 after Beacon Hill headland was dynamited to make space for it. Charles Dickens was said to have given readings there.

During World War I military hospitals were sited in Torquay – many survivors from the Battle of Gallipoli recuperated in the town – and it was used as a troop staging area. In September 1915 King George V and Queen Mary visited.

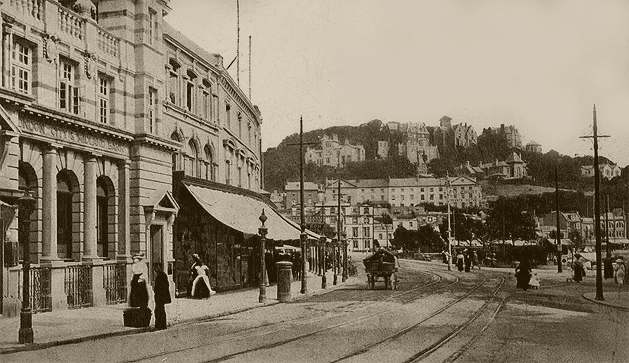
The Strand, 1900

During World War II Torquay was regarded as safer than the towns of South East England and played host to evacuees from the London area. The town did, however, suffer minor bomb damage during the war, mainly from planes dumping excess loads after participating in the Plymouth Blitz. The last air raid on Torquay took place on 29 May 1944, shortly before the D-Day landings in June, and in the months leading up to D-Day thousands of US Army personnel arrived with the 3204th Quartermaster Service Company billeted in Chelston and Cockington. During Operation Overlord more than 23,000 men of the American 4th Infantry Division departed from Torquay for Utah Beach. The loading ramps used by the American army are still visible in front of the Regina Hotel on Vaughan Parade.

The water sport events of the 1948 Summer Olympic Games were held in Torquay and the Olympic flame brought from London to Torre Abbey Gardens. Although it did not host any Olympic events for the 2012 Summer Olympics, with the sailing taking place in Weymouth, Torbay hosted teams as a preparation camp and the flame passed through once more on its route around the UK.

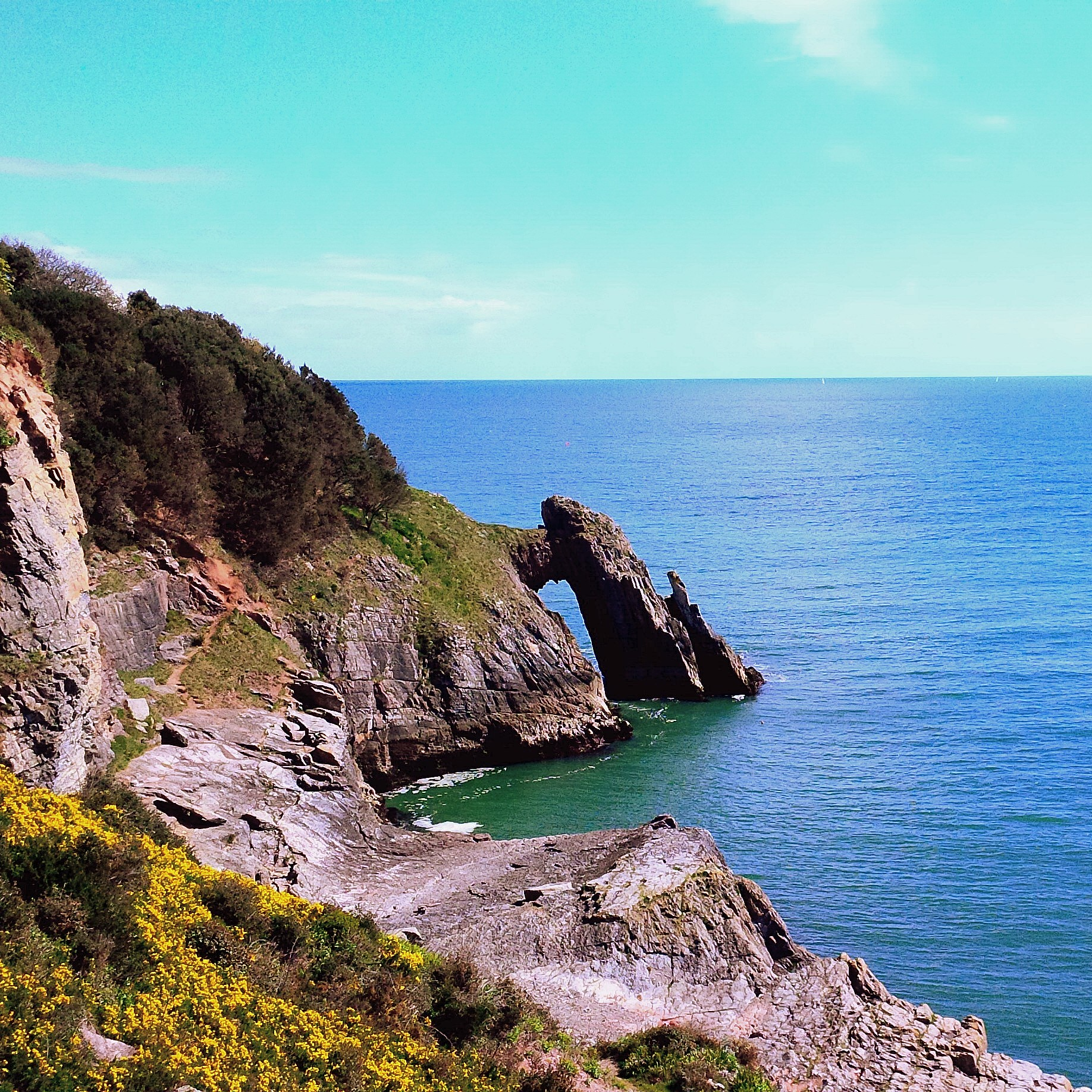
Cliffs in Torquay

After World War II several private high-rise blocks of flats were constructed above the Rock Walk cliffs and harbour, giving the area a Monte Carlo feel. In 1971, after a tragedy, the Marine Spa was demolished to make way for the ill-fated Coral Island leisure complex, characterised by its concrete arches on its uppermost floor and sunbathing decks like those of a cruise liner. The site featured a hexagonal outdoor plunge pool surrounded by sunbathing terraces leading down to Beacon Cove beach. Inside the building were several lounges, a restaurant and a nightclub within the arches of the ancient swimming bath. All levels were served by a hydraulic passenger lift. Coral Island opened in 1977 and closed in 1988. The complex was demolished in 1997, 20 years after its construction. The site remained derelict until 2002 when the Living Coasts coastal zoo was built there.

Torquay also boasted rehabilitation facilities for the blind at America Lodge, which was owned by the RNIB for a number of decades. Like many RNIB properties it was sold off in the 1990s and the building was divided into flats.

In the late 1980s Fleet Street was rebuilt as the Fleet Walk shopping centre, with street-level shops and an upper-level shopping deck. The long, curved building, which follows the street, is magnolia-coloured and in mock Victorian style. In the late 1990s and early 2000s new pubs and night clubs opened around the harbour, leading to an increase in binge drinking; however in recent years a better police presence and responsible-drinking promotions have improved the situation.

Areas around Torquay have also been affected by either refurbishments or closure. For instance the Rock Walk, on the town's seafront, was refurbished through a £3 million funding project, resulting in its reopening on 3 October 2010 as part of the Royal Terrace Gardens festival. In 2013 the Torquay Pavilion was closed after a loss of funding and attempts to reopen it under new funding are ongoing.

Torquay Town Hall, Castle Circus, built 1911

== Governance ==
There is only one tier of local government covering Torquay, the unitary authority of Torbay, which covers Torquay, Paignton and Brixham. Torbay Council is based in Torquay, with its headquarters at Torquay Town Hall.

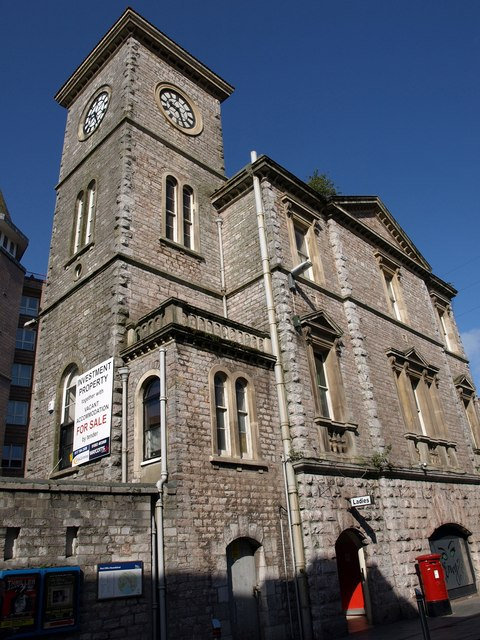
Old Town Hall, Union Street, built 1852

Historically Torquay was in the ancient parish of Tormoham. Until 1835 the parish was controlled by the landowners and the vestry, in the same way as most rural areas. More urban forms of local government began in 1835, when improvement commissioners were appointed for the parish. The unelected commissioners were replaced in 1850 with an elected local board. One of the local board's first projects was to build a town hall on Union Street, which was completed in 1852.

In May 1876 the Tormoham Local Board voted to change its name to the Torquay Local Board, acknowledging that Torquay was by then the more commonly used name for the town; it was said that having a different official name had been causing confusion. In 1892 Torquay was made a municipal borough, governed by a corporate body officially called the 'mayor, aldermen and burgesses of the borough of Torquay' but generally known as the corporation or the town council.

The borough was enlarged in 1900 to take in the neighbouring parish of St Marychurch and the Chelston area from the neighbouring parish of Cockington. The rest of Cockington was absorbed into the borough in 1928. In 1911 a new town hall was built at Castle Circus.

In 1968 the borough of Torquay, the urban districts of Paignton and Brixham and the parish of Churston Ferrers were all abolished. A county borough called Torbay was created to cover the whole area (with some adjustments of the boundaries with neighbouring parishes at the same time). As a county borough Torbay was administratively independent of Devon County Council. Six years later, in 1974, local government was reformed again, with Torbay becoming a non-metropolitan district and Devon County Council providing county-level services to the area again. Torbay regained its independence from the county council in 1998 when it was made a unitary authority. Torbay remains part of the ceremonial county of Devon for the purposes of lieutenancy.

Torbay Constituency

Torquay (along with part of Paignton) is in the Torbay parliamentary constituency, created in 1974; previous to that, it was in its own eponymous constituency. The constituency elects one Member of Parliament, since 2024 Steve Darling of the Liberal Democrats.

== Geography ==
Some areas in Torquay

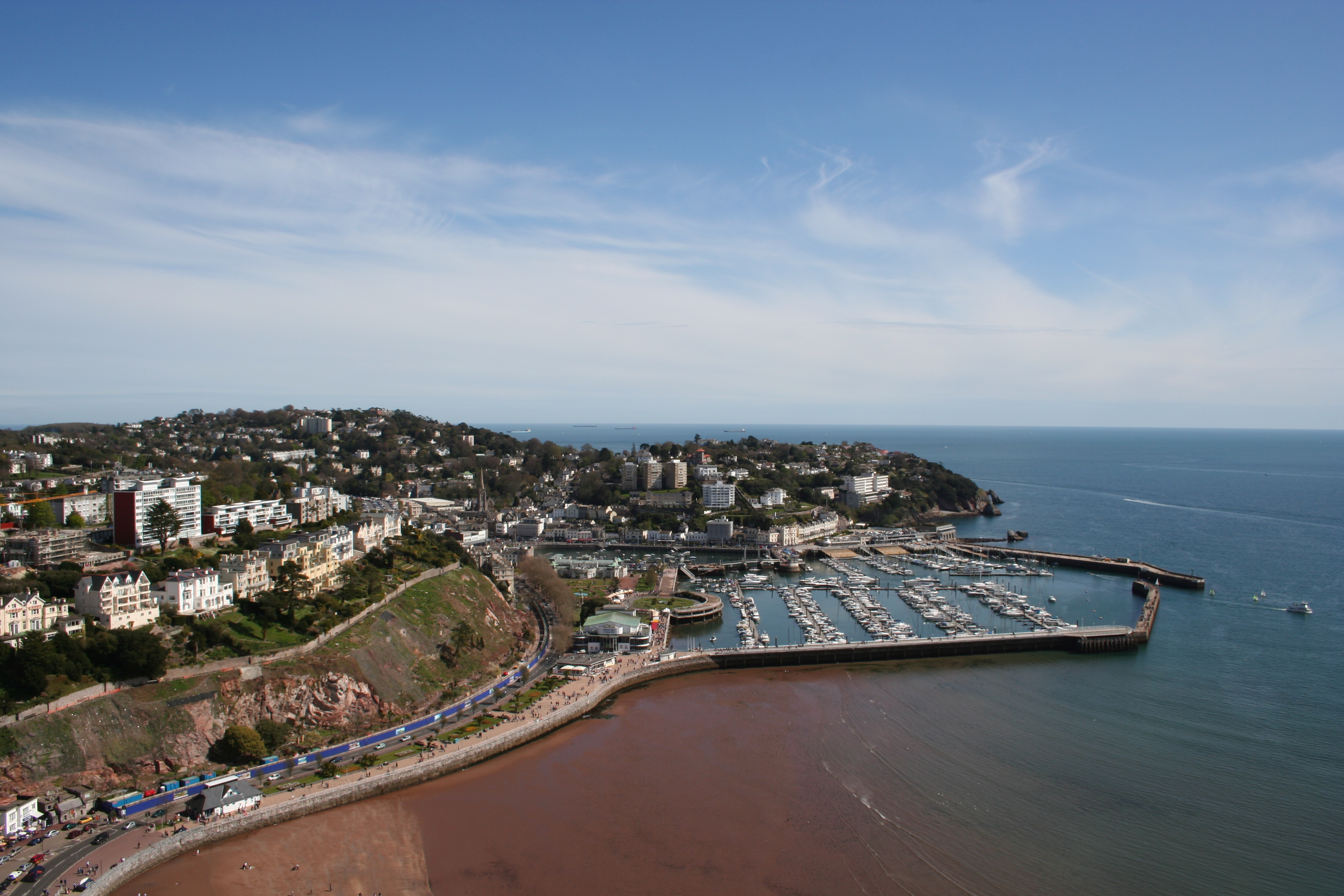
Aerial view of Torquay Harbour

Torquay is situated on the southwestern coast of England, forming one-third of Torbay, on the western side of the bay. It has a mild microclimate, with winters that tend to be mild and wet. A record high temperature of 31.5C was recorded on 14 July 2013, at 5:30 p.m.

The town is made up of a number of small settlements that were amalgamated into the town of Torquay. The town's historic core consists of Tormohun (also historically known as Tormoham), Wellswood, The Warberries, Upton and Ellacombe and is based upon what was once the holdings of the Palk family. In 1900, Chelston and Livermead, part of the Cockington estate owned by the Mallocks, were annexed by the town and this was followed by the absorption of the former borough of St Marychurch. In this period St Marychurch covered Plainmoor, Watcombe, Babbacombe and Kingskerswell.

Wellswood and the Lincombes were built up by wealthy Victorians who, influenced by their travels around the Mediterranean, built large villas with Italianate features and towers. There are many pine trees, bay bushes and trees (Laurus nobilis), various palm tree species and Phormiums. Cabbage trees or Torbay Palms are a notable feature of the area; the trees were introduced into the area from New Zealand in 1820 and since then have flourished.

The main beaches of Torquay are Oddicombe Beach, Meadfoot Beach, Maidencombe, Watcombe, Babbacombe Beach, Anstey's Cove, Redgate, Torre Abbey Sands, Corbyn Sands and Institute Beach and Hollacombe Beach. The first two of these held European Blue Flag status in 2012.

The Sticklepath fault line, which runs across Devon from Bideford Bay to Torquay, is one of many geological faults criss-crossing Torbay; the Babbacombe Cliff Railway takes advantage of one of these fault lines.

On the coast of Wellswood is London Bridge, a limestone arch that can be seen from a viewpoint on the South West Coast Path.

Climate data for Torquay
Month	Jan	Feb	Mar	Apr	May	Jun	Jul	Aug	Sep	Oct	Nov	Dec	Year
Mean daily maximum °C (°F)	9.3 (48.7)	9.1 (48.4)	10.9 (51.6)	13.0 (55.4)	15.9 (60.6)	19.1 (66.4)	21.1 (70.0)	20.7 (69.3)	18.7 (65.7)	15.8 (60.4)	12.1 (53.8)	10.3 (50.5)	14.7 (58.4)
Mean daily minimum °C (°F)	4.1 (39.4)	4.0 (39.2)	4.8 (40.6)	6.2 (43.2)	8.9 (48.0)	11.7 (53.1)	13.6 (56.5)	13.5 (56.3)	11.9 (53.4)	9.9 (49.8)	6.5 (43.7)	5.1 (41.2)	8.4 (47.0)
Average precipitation mm (inches)	134 (5.3)	105 (4.1)	95 (3.7)	64 (2.5)	67 (2.6)	61 (2.4)	56 (2.2)	75 (3.0)	81 (3.2)	101 (4.0)	109 (4.3)	131 (5.2)	1,125.6 (44.31)
Average precipitation days (≥ 1.0 mm)	19	15	16	14	14	11	10	12	13	16	17	18	175
Mean monthly sunshine hours	64.6	80.3	129.1	181.8	223.0	227.2	234.8	211.3	161.9	111.5	85.2	64.6	1,775.2

== Transport ==
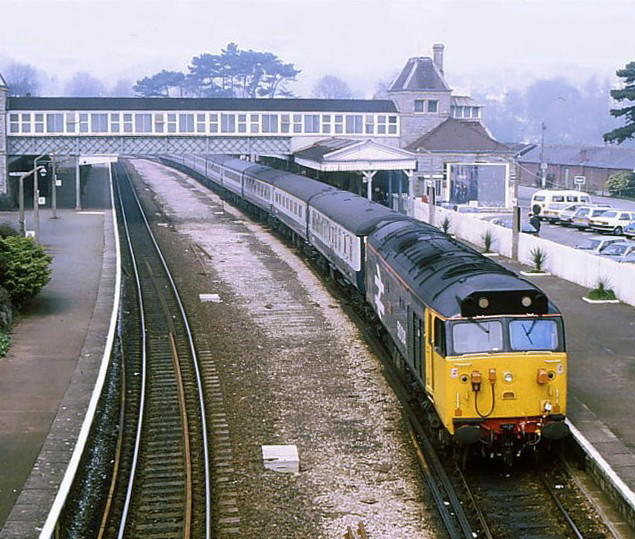
Torquay Railway Station in 1988

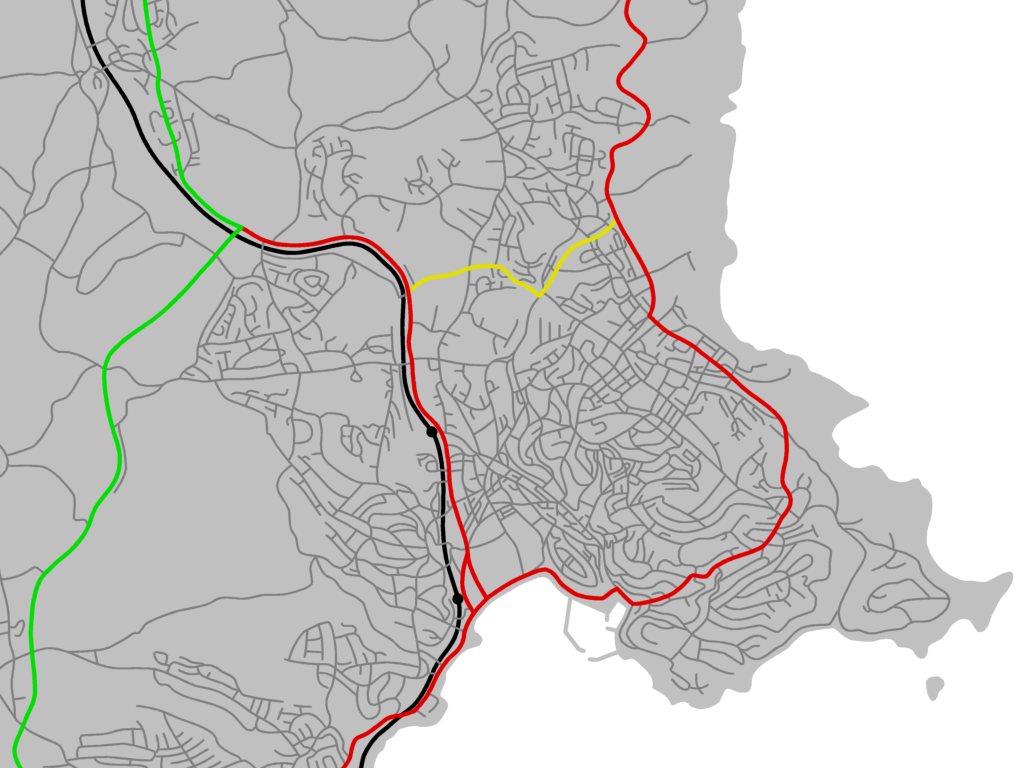
Transport in Torquay – the railway (black, with Torre and Torquay stations marked), A380 (green), A3022 and A379 (red), and B3199 (yellow)

=== Rail ===
Torquay has two railway stations. Torquay railway station is situated near the sea, close to Torre Abbey Sands. Torre railway station is situated a little inland adjacent to the road leading to Newton Abbot. Not all trains stop at Torre. As of 2013, there were plans for station improvements at Torquay and Torre (and at Paignton) and to build a new station at Edginswell.

=== Road ===
Torquay is connected to the UK motorway network by the A380, which traces the outskirts of the town as Hellevoetsluis Way and Hamelin Way, leading to the A38 and the M5 at Exeter. The A3022 branches from the A380, leading into Torquay as Riviera Way, to the seafront as Newton Road and then Avenue Road, and then on to Paignton as Torbay Road. The A379 runs past the harbour to Babbacombe and St Marychurch, and then north along the coast to Teignmouth. Work on constructing a new dual carriageway on the outskirts of Torquay near the Kingskerswell end was completed in 2015 with a new junction between the A380 South Devon Highway and Torbay Ring Road.

=== Bus ===
The main bus operator in Torquay is Stagecoach South West. Its service 12 passes through Torquay – between Newton Abbot and Brixham, – while many other routes operate within the town. From 1919 to 1996 Devon General ran buses in Torquay. From 23 May 1965, introduction of the one-way traffic scheme required buses from Paignton to divert via Abbey Road.

== Demography ==
=== Population ===
At the 2021 United Kingdom census, the built-up area of Torquay had a population of 52,037 inhabitants.

=== Ethnicity ===
The 2021 United Kingdom census reported that 96.9% were white, 1.4% Mixed, 1.1% Asian, 0.2% Black and 0.4% other.

=== Religion ===
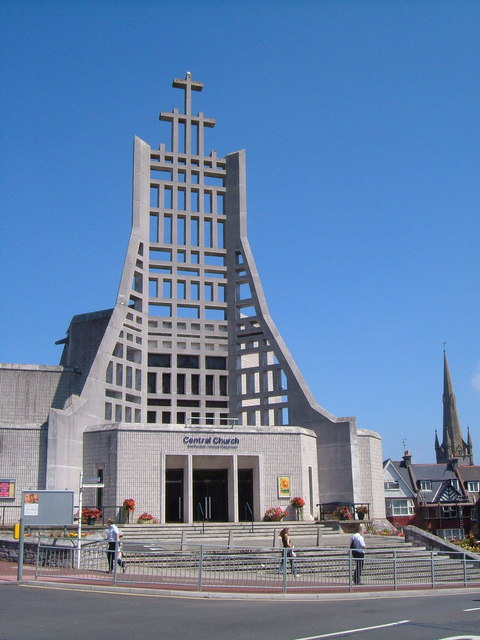
Central Church, Torquay

Torquay has about 60 churches from a wide variety of Christian denominations. Central Church (Methodist and United Reformed Church) has a notable pierced screen wall facade. St Matthias's Church, Wellswood, was built as a chapel-of-ease to St Mark's, Torwood, in the 1850s and became a parish church in 1880. In the 1970s, the churches of St Mark and Holy Trinity were closed and in 1979, the vicar of St Matthias's became rector of the parish of St Matthias, St Mark and Holy Trinity.

St Saviour's Church and St Michael's Chapel are medieval church buildings, now Anglican. St Saviour's originally had no aisles but a north aisle was added in the 14th century. The tower is at the west end and early medieval in date. Other restoration was carried out both on the exterior and interior in 1849. The monuments include one in early Tudor style to Thomas Cary (d. 1567) and another to Thomas Ridgeway (d. 1604) which includes an alabaster effigy. The Chapel of St Michael is only 36 by 15 ft and its floor is the uneven surface of the rock on which it stands. The roof has a barrel vault and the windows are small. The 19th-century Anglican churches of Torquay include All Saints, Bamfylde Road (1884–90, architect John Loughborough Pearson), St John's, Montpelier Terrace (1861–71, architect George Edmund Street), St Luke's (1863, architect Sir Arthur Blomfield), St Mark's, St Mark's Road (1856–57, architect Anthony Salvin), St Mary Magdalene, Union Street (1846, architect Anthony Salvin), and St Michael, Pimlico (1877, architect Pritchard). Two Roman Catholic churches, both built in the 19th century and listed buildings, in Torquay are the Church of the Assumption of Our Lady and Our Lady Help of Christians and St Denis Church.

The former St Andrew's Presbyterian church (built in 1862) on Torwood Gardens Road closed in 1951 and after a time as a nightclub was converted to private residences.

There is also a Christadelphian meeting hall in the town.

There is also an Islamic centre and mosque. A United Hebrew Congregation synagogue was closed in 2000 and the congregation dissolved.

== Economy ==
=== Tourism ===
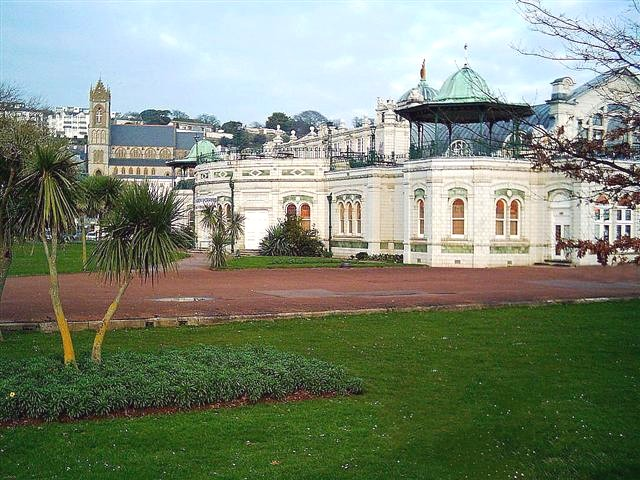
Torquay Pavilion, with St John's Church in the background and a cabbage tree in the foreground

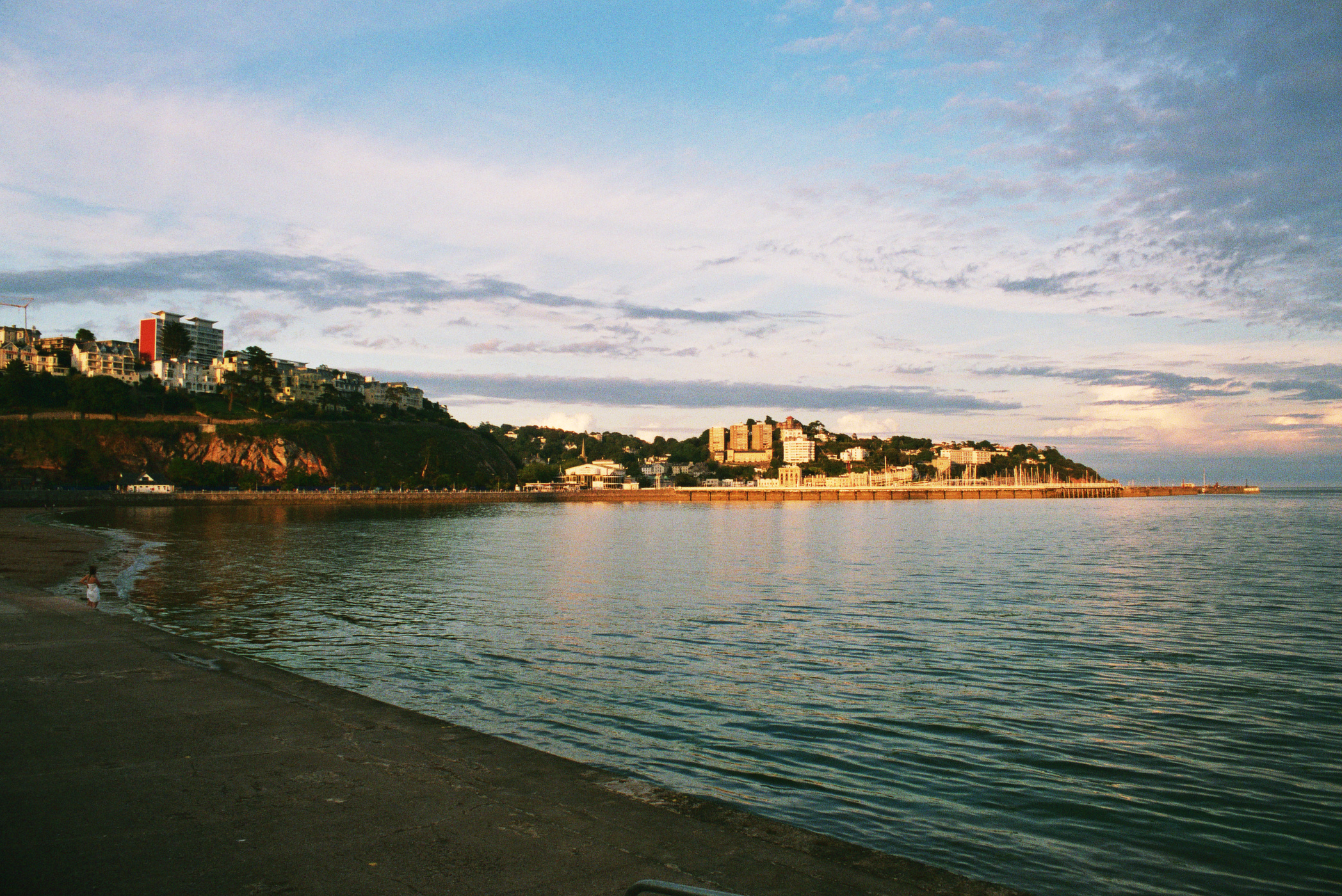
Torquay from Torre Abbey Sands

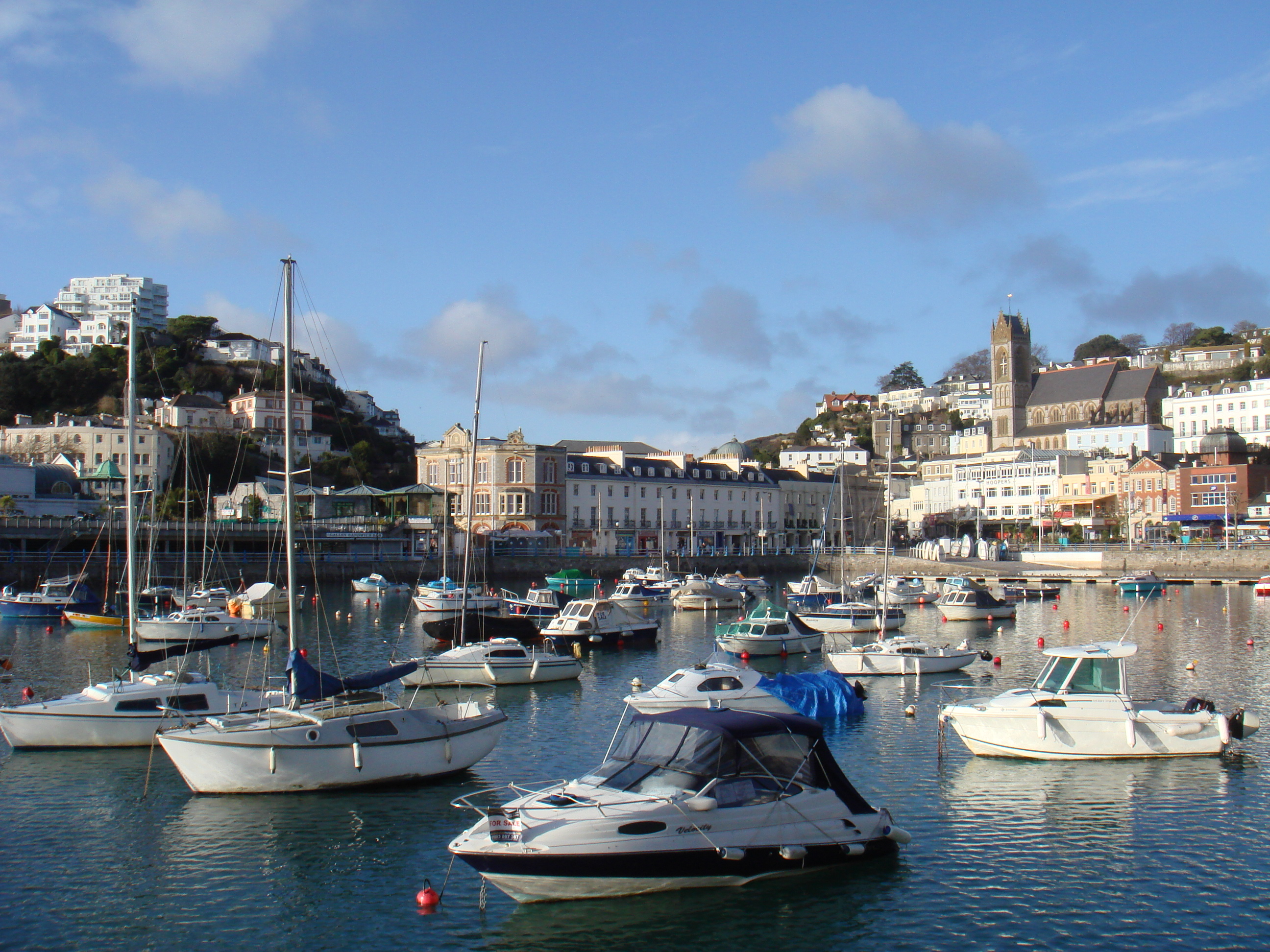
Torquay Harbour

Torquay has numerous tourist attractions, including Kents Cavern, Britain's most important Stone Age site, which was home to early humans for some 40,000 years. The floor is composed of several strata, with remains indicating the prehistoric coexistence there of humans and extinct animals. The Rev. J. McEnery explored the cave between 1825 and 1829 and put forth the coexistence theory. The cave was extensively explored from 1865 to 1880 by William Pengelly, who found evidence to support McEnery's hypothesis. The caves have attracted many famous people, among them Agatha Christie, Beatrix Potter, King George V and Haile Selassie, who was so impressed with his visit that he gave his guide, Leslie Powe, a gold sovereign.

On the seafront between the Rock Walk and the Marina is the Victorian Pavilion (pictured). The adjacent "Friends Fountain" complements the Victorian architecture. Just to the side of the fountain in Princess Gardens, right next to Princess Theatre, is the English Riviera Wheel; a 100-foot-high wheel that offers a unique birds'-eye view of the English Riviera, overlooking Torquay Harbour from a rare perspective.

Torquay Museum, the oldest in Devon, was founded in 1844 by The Torquay Natural History Society. The museum contains extensive geology, natural science, archaeology and ethnography collections of international importance, including the oldest fossil evidence of modern man in north-west Europe. The story of the English Riviera Geopark is told through exhibitions on geology, fossils and archaeology, including artefacts from Kents Cavern and other local archaeology. The museum has galleries dedicated to diverse topics such as the life of Agatha Christie, ancient Egypt, explorers and ecology. Another gallery displays replica historic farmhouse interiors.

In 1857 the Bath's Saloons complex was built on the promontory overlooking Beacon Cove. This included a ballroom, concert hall, sunlit conservatory and private bathing facilities with, underneath, a large public swimming bath open to the sea. Living Coasts, a coastal zoo owned by Paignton Zoo, was later built on the site of the complex. The stone arches of the public bath were incorporated into the shop at Living Coasts. Development of the site as a marine animal exhibit was first proposed in early 1999 in response to a call from Torbay Council for submissions from interested parties. The project, developed by Kay Elliott architects, included an exhibit to house marine birds, rather than fish, owing to the need to avoid duplicating the exhibits at the National Marine Aquarium in Plymouth. The project was subsequently taken on by Paignton Zoo Environmental Park and named Living Coasts. It was announced in June 2020 that owing to the COVID-19 pandemic it was to close permanently.

Other attractions are the Babbacombe Model Village, which opened in 1963, the Babbacombe Theatre, which opened in 1939, and the Princess Theatre. A large tethered balloon offering aerial views of the town operated for several years until it was destroyed by strong winds in January 2012.

From 1875 a number of potteries operated in Torquay, making Torquay pottery for both the tourist trade and the high-end retail market.

=== Other ===
Torquay was the home of Suttons Seeds until it relocated to the neighbouring town of Paignton in 1998, and Beverage Brands, the owners of the popular and controversial alcoholic brand WKD, was based in the town until 2011.

== Culture ==
=== Arts ===
In the early years of British cinema, Torquay was home to two production companies, Cairns Torquay Films and Torquay And Paignton Photoplay Productions, who in 1920, produced a total of three films between them.

Devon Films, one of the Bay's most important film production companies, is based in Torquay.

The Princess Theatre, which is by the side of the harbour, is owned by Torbay Council and operated by ATG (Ambassador Theatre Group). With about 1,500 seats, it is Torquay's largest theatre and plays host to touring independent production companies. The Princess Theatre also holds weddings and other functions such as parties and large seminars. TOADS Theatre Company operates the Little Theatre in Meadfoot in the converted St Mark's Church, hosting both the company's own productions and those of visiting societies. Babbacombe Theatre is located on Babbacombe Downs and describes itself as having the longest-running summer season in the country, which lasts nine months.

Torbay Council, along with other local bodies, administers Creative Torbay, a website for local cultural organisations, creatives and artists to promote their work.

=== Media ===
Torquay's local radio stations are BBC Radio Devon, Radio Exe Devon, Heart West, and Greatest Hits Radio South West (formerly known as Palm 105.5 and The Breeze), which has its studios in Lymington Road in Torquay.

Local TV coverage is provided by BBC South West and ITV West Country. Television signals are received from the Beacon Hill and the local relay TV transmitters.

The town's local newspaper is the Herald Express, which has been published since 1925, after a merger of two papers.

Past newspapers include the Torquay and Tor General Advertisor and Director, founded in 1839, which in 1853 became The Torquay Directory and South Devon Journal until 1949, finally becoming The South Devon Journal, which closed in 1973.

=== Sport ===
Torquay has a long history of holding sailing events and regattas due to the favourable easterly facing nature of the bay and its popularity in the 19th and 20th centuries. This tradition reached its height in 1948 when the water sport events of the 1948 Summer Olympics were held in Torquay, with the Olympic flame being transferred from London to Torre Abbey Gardens to reside throughout the event.

Torquay is represented in association football in the National League South by Torquay United F.C. The team plays their home matches at Plainmoor and made it on occasion to the third tier of the English football leagues, now known as League One. Torquay United were promoted from the Conference Premier after winning the play-off final at Wembley in June 2009. However, after a poor Football League Two campaign in the 13/14 season, Torquay United came last and were relegated back to the Conference Premier (now the National League). Torquay were relegated previously in 2007 from the Football League after 80 years of membership and spent two years playing in the Conference Premier; this downfall came just three years after promotion from the league's basement division and ultimately led to a change in ownership of the club to a consortium of local businessmen and fans.

== Politics ==
From 1974, when it was created, until 1997 Torbay constituency was a safe Conservative seat, but Liberal Democrat Adrian Sanders overturned spy writer Rupert Allason's majority by just 12 votes in 1997, widened to 6,708 in 2001.

During the 2005 general election, the Conservative leader, Michael Howard, visited the town. However Sanders retained the seat with 40.8% of the votes (19,317, down from 23,012 in 2001). A swing of 9.7% away from the Liberal Democrats was split between the Conservatives (with a 4.9% swing), Labour – who gained a substantial increase in their vote as support for Lib Dems in 1997 and 2001 moved back - and the United Kingdom Independence Party (UKIP), whose candidate, Graham Booth, improved on his deposit-losing 2001 performance with a 4.7% increase in his vote.

In 2005 a referendum was held to appoint Torbay's first elected mayor. In the ensuing election in October 2005, the winning candidate was a former Liberal parliamentary candidate, Nicholas Bye, a Conservative.

In 2011 Gordon Oliver was elected as Torbay's new mayor, beating the existing mayor, Nicholas Bye. Oliver finished with 12,716 votes and Bye 9,631 after the two had reached the second and final round of counting.

== Education ==
Torquay has a number of primary schools, including St Margaret's Primary School in St Marychurch, which has around 329 pupils and is situated on a large site of more than 1,800 square metres (19,000 sq ft) formerly a farm.

There are five main secondary schools in the town. Torquay Academy, previously known as Torquay Community School and Audley Park, has had its troubles but since 2001 has come out of Ofsted special measures. The school had a £26 million rebuild and in December 2010, when reassessed by Ofsted, was told that it had become "a good and improving school". It changed to academy status in September 2001, sponsored by Torquay Boys' Grammar School.

The Spires College (formerly Westlands School) is a combined secondary school and sixth form college and in 2002 moved to a new building. St Cuthbert Mayne School is a joint Roman Catholic and Church of England secondary school and sixth form.

Torquay's other two state secondary schools are selective. They are Torquay Boys' Grammar School and Torquay Grammar School for Girls, which accept only those who pass the Eleven plus exam and the schools' own standardised test. There are also a number of private schools in the area, including the Abbey School.

For further education students can go either to one of the sixth forms at the previously mentioned Torquay Academy, The Spires, St Cuthbert's Mayne or Grammar schools, or to South Devon College, on a new campus in Long Road, Paignton, that fully opened in January 2006.

== Crime ==
Offences	Total
Violence against the Person with injury	1,125
Violence against a Person without Injury	1,005
Sexual Offences	167
Robbery Offences	60
Burglary in a Dwelling	385
Burglary in a Building other than a Dwelling	496
Offences against a Vehicle	834
Drug Offences	638
Fraud and Forgery	234
Criminal Damage	2,090
Other Theft Offences	2,277
Other Offences	138

Information taken from 2010 crime figures in Torbay (up to and including 31 December 2010)

== Healthcare ==
Torquay has two hospitals, the NHS-run Torbay Hospital which is situated on Newton Road, Shiphay and the private, non-emergency Mount Stuart Hospital run by Ramsay Health Care UK on St Vincent's Road, Torre.

== In English culture ==
A number of sketches for the Monty Python's Flying Circus television show (1969–74) were filmed on location in and around both Torquay and neighbouring Paignton. It was while staying in Torquay, at the Gleneagles Hotel with the Python team in 1971, that John Cleese found inspiration (and the setting, although not the actual film location) for the popular sitcom Fawlty Towers (1975, 1979). Incidents during the Pythons' stay are said to include the owner, Donald Sinclair, having thrown Eric Idle's suitcase out of a window in case it contained a bomb. Cleese later described the eccentric owner as "the most wonderfully rude man I have ever met", although Sinclair's widow has since said her husband was totally misrepresented in the comedy.

In the 1970s several episodes of the comedy series The Goodies were filmed in and around Torquay. In 1979 the town was again the site of filming when the Ray Winstone BAFTA nominated drama That Summer! was both set in and filmed around the town. In 2003 the film Blackball, starring Paul Kaye, was set and partly shot there.

In October 2010 it was reported that Bristol-based artist Banksy had painted a mural on the wall of the Grosvenor Hotel in Belgrave Road. The mural shows a child drawing a robot and uses the vent of an extractor fan as the head of the robot. The painting was vandalised in May 2011. This mural was sold to a collector and removed in 2021.

The Victorian mansion in Torquay where Agatha Christie was born and grew up, Ashfield in Barton Road, was demolished in 1961 to build a housing estate and an extension for South Devon College. A blue plaque marking the spot was unveiled in 2007.

== Notable people ==
Notable people born in Torquay
1821–1890	Sir Richard Burton
1843–1900	Richard Mallock
1844–1920	Arthur Philpotts
1860–1942	Sir Lionel Stopford
1867–1925	Percy Fawcett
1890–1976	Agatha Christie
1918- 1998	Brian Stonehouse
1921–1999	Bill Strang
1922–2007	Sir Richard Gordon Wakeford
1934–2007	Robin Midgley
1937–1995	Peter Cook
born 1938	Neil Oram
1939–2014	Sir Hugo White
born 1945	David Southwood
born 1947	Martin Turner
born 1948	Sir Peter Riddell
born 1949	Sir Roger Deakins
born 1972	Miranda Hart
1973–2014	Rebekah Gibbs
born 1982	Lauren Pope
born 1983	Max Evans
born 1987	Lily Cole
born 1994	Georgia Toffolo
born 1995	Ollie Watkins

- Pat Arrowsmith - author and peace campaigner, co-founder of the CND in 1957.
- Elizabeth Barrett Browning poet
- Sir Richard Francis Burton - British explorer, writer, scholar and military officer.
- Agatha Christie – mystery and detective writer
- Lily Cole - model and actress
- Peter Cook – comedian, actor, satirist, playwright and screenwriter
- Steve Darling - politician, MP for Torbay since 2024.
- Roger Deakins – cinematographer
- Max Evans – rugby player
- Percy Fawcett – explorer
- Rebekah Gibbs - TV and musical theatre actress.
- Larry Grayson – comedian and TV presenter, who lived in Torquay in later life
- Miranda Hart - actress, comedian and writer
- Richard Mallock - Army officer and politician, MP for Torquay from 1886 to 1895.
- Robin Midgley - director in theatre, television and radio
- Penny Mordaunt – politician, MP for Portsmouth North from 2010 to 2024.
- Neil Oram - musician, poet, artist and playwright.
- Arthur Philpotts - politician, MP for Torquay, 1895 to 1900
- Lauren Pope - DJ, model and entrepreneur
- Sir Peter Riddell - journalist and author
- Donald Sinclair - naval officer and hotel owner
- David Southwood - space scientist
- Brian Stonehouse - painter and Special Operations Executive agent in WWII.
- Sir Lionel Stopford - Commandant of the Royal Military College Sandhurst.
- Bill Strang - British aerospace engineer, co-designed Concorde.
- Georgia Toffolo - TV and media personality
- Martin Turner - musician with Wishbone Ash
- Sir Richard Gordon Wakeford - Royal Air Force officer from 1941 to 1977.
- Ollie Watkins – footballer for Aston Villa F.C. and 20 games for England
- Mike Westmacott – mountaineer, climbed with the 1953 British Mount Everest Expedition
- Sir Hugo White - senior officer Royal Navy and Governor of Gibraltar

== See also ==
- Babbacombe Cliff Railway

== Sources ==
- Russell, Percy (1960). A History of Torquay. Torquay: Devonshire Press Limited.
