= Torquay Town Hall =

Municipal building in Torquay, Devon, England

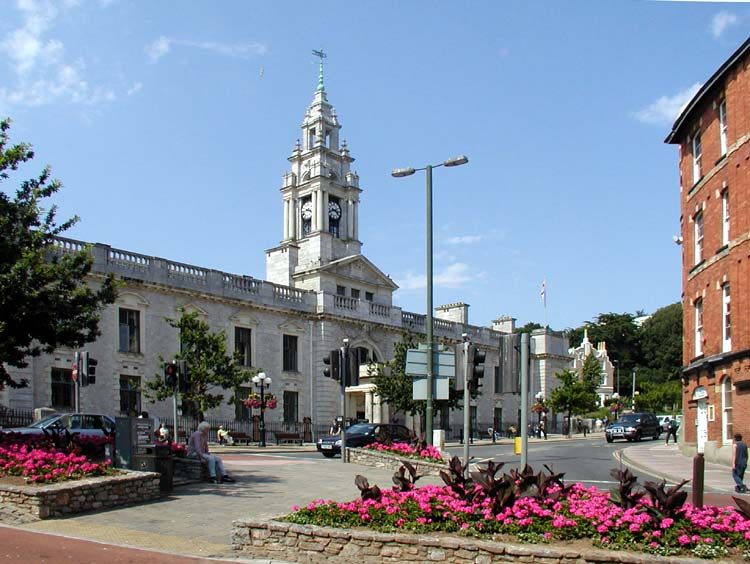
- Torquay Town Hall

- Shown in Devon
- 50.4687°N 3.5320°W
- Location: Castle Circus, Torquay, Devon

History
- Built: 1911

Site notes
- Architect: Thomas Davison
- Architectural style: Edwardian Baroque style

Listed Building – Grade II
- Official name: The Town Hall
- Designated: 10 January 1975
- Reference no.: 1208247

Torquay Town Hall is a municipal building in Castle Circus in Torquay, Devon, England. The building, which is the meeting place of Torbay Council, is a Grade II listed building.

== History ==
The first municipal structure in Torquay was the old town hall in Union Street which was completed in June 1852. After finding that the old town hall was too small for their needs, civic leaders decided to procure a new building; the site they selected had previously formed part of the grounds of St Mary Magdalene's Church.

The foundation stone for the new building was laid by the mayor, Councillor John Smerdon, on 14 February 1906. It was designed by Thomas Davison in the Edwardian Baroque style and built in two phases: the first phase, to the south west, which included the Carnegie library, was built by R. E. Narracott of Stoke Gabriel and completed in 1907 and the second phase, to the north east, which included the civic rooms, was built by R. Wilkins of Bristol and was completed in 1911. The complex was officially opened in August 1913.

The design involved a symmetrical main frontage with thirteen bays facing onto Castle Circus with the end bays slightly projected forward; the central section, which also slightly projected forward, featured a portico with Doric order columns supporting an entablature with triglyphs and a coat of arms above; there was a Diocletian window on the first floor and a pediment and a three-stage clock tower above, containing an electric clock by Messrs Gent of Leicester. The south west elevation featured a domed curved entrance giving access to the library, while the north east elevation featured three recessed bays giving access to the main hall.

During the First World War, the town hall was used as a Red Cross Voluntary Aid Detachment auxiliary hospital for wounded service personnel. Nursing staff included the novelist, Agatha Christie, who arrived in October 1914. King George V and Queen Mary visited the hospital and met with wounded soldiers on 10 September 1915. Speakers in the main hall included the novelist, Arthur Conan Doyle, who lectured on "Death and the Hereafter" on 5 August 1920. There were also concert performances by the Rolling Stones in August 1964, by the Who in July 1965 and by David Bowie in June 1973.

The building was the headquarters of Torquay Borough Council for much of the 20th century and remained the local seat of government when the short-lived Torbay County Borough Council was formed in 1968; in 1974 it became the home of Torbay District Council which renamed itself Torbay Council when it became the unitary authority for the area in April 1998. Repairs to clock tower were carried out in autumn 2020.

Works in the town hall include a portrait of the former local member of parliament, Sir Lawrence Palk.
