= 2023 Wyre Forest District Council election =

2023 English local election

- 4 May 2023

All 33 seats on Wyre Forest District Council 17 seats needed for a majority

	First party	Second party	Third party
Leader	Marcus Hart	Helen Dyke	Leigh Whitehouse
Party	Conservative	Independent	Labour
Last election	14 seats, 31.6%	5 seats, 10.6%	2 seats, 16.1%
Seats before	14	5	2
Seats won	20	6	4
Seat change	▲6	▲1	▲2
Popular vote	8,609	5,595	6,969
Percentage	29.6%	19.3%	24.0%
Swing	▼2.0%	▲8.7%	▲7.9%
	Fourth party	Fifth party	Sixth party
Leader	Fran Oborski
Party	Liberal Democrats	Green	Independent Health Concern
Last election	3 seats, 10.5%	1 seat, 7.7%	8 seats, 17.3%
Seats before	3	1	8
Seats won	2	1	0
Seat change	▼1	Steady	▼8
Popular vote	4,081	3,799	N/A
Percentage	14.0%	13.1%	N/A
Swing	▲3.5%	▲5.4%	N/A
- Map of the results
Leader before election
Helen Dyke
Independent
No overall control
Leader after election
Marcus Hart
Conservative

The 2023 Wyre Forest District Council election took place on 4 May 2023, to elect all 33 members of Wyre Forest District Council in Worcestershire, England. This was on the same day as other local elections across England.

Prior to the election the council was under no overall control, being run by a "progressive alliance" of Independent Health Concern, Labour, Green and independent councillors. The Conservatives won a majority of the seats at this election. Wyre Forest was one of only two councils where the Conservatives gained control in the 2023 elections, with the party generally losing seats and councils elsewhere.

== Summary ==
Prior to the election the eight Independent Health Concern councillors, five independent councillors and the one Green councillor had sat together as one "Independent Group", led by independent councillor Helen Dyke. The Independent Group and Labour together formed the council's administration, calling themselves a progressive alliance, with Helen Dyke serving as leader of the council. Local party Independent Health Concern announced in 2022 that it would no longer be fielding candidates at elections; its sitting councillors who chose to stand for re-election in 2023 did so as independent candidates.

The Conservatives and Labour saw gains, whilst the Liberal Democrats and independents (when including the former Independent Health Concern councillors) suffered loses. The only Green councillor retained her seat. Whilst the Conservatives suffered loses throughout the country, in Wyre Forest the Conservatives won a majority of the seats. Torbay and Wyre Forest were the only two councils where the Conservatives gained a majority at this election.

Conservative leader Marcus Hart was appointed leader of the council at the subsequent annual council meeting on 17 May 2023.

== Overall results ==
The overall results were as follows:

2023 Wyre Forest District Council election
Party	Candidates	Seats	Gains	Losses	Net gain/loss	Seats %	Votes %	Votes	+/−
Conservative	33	20	7	1	▲6	60.6	29.6	8,609	▼2.0
Labour	15	4	2	0	▲2	12.1	24.0	6,969	▲7.9
Independent	17	6	2	1	▲1	18.2	19.3	5,595	▲8.7
Liberal Democrats	17	2	0	1	▼1	6.1	14.0	4,081	▲3.5
Green	17	1	0	0	Steady	3.0	13.1	3,799	▲5.4

== Ward results ==
The results for each ward were as follows, with an asterisk (*) indicating an incumbent councillor standing for re-election:

=== Aggborough and Spennells ===
Aggborough and Spennells
Party	Candidate	Votes	%	±%
Independent	Helen Elizabeth Dyke*	1,324	64.6	−2.9
Independent	Peter Dyke*	1,213	59.2	−2.8
Independent	John Cedric Aston*	1,142	55.7	+1.2
Conservative	Owen Boyd Cave	483	23.6	+3.3
Labour	George Price	426	20.8	+9.6
Conservative	Thomas Jordan	366	17.9	N/A
Conservative	Richard Simon Sherrey (Simon Sherrey)	328	16.0	N/A
Liberal Democrats	Rachel Louise Akathiotis	283	13.8	N/A
Turnout		2,049	31.31	
Registered electors		6,570		
Rejected ballots		8	0.4	
Independent hold				
Independent hold				
Independent hold				

=== Areley Kings and Riverside ===
Areley Kings and Riverside
Party	Candidate	Votes	%	±%
Conservative	Kenneth James Henderson* (Ken Henderson)	795	46.1	+14.4
Conservative	Daniel Carberry Russell (Danny Russell)	656	38.1	+8.7
Conservative	Alan Sutton	562	32.6	+6.2
Labour	Carol Gwyneth Warren	519	30.1	+5.5
Labour	Nick Bartram-Savage	485	28.1	+7.4
Independent	Robert John Lloyd (Rob Lloyd)	424	24.6	+4.0
Independent	John William Roland Thomas*	325	18.9	−18.8
Green	Valerie Margaret Wood	307	17.8	+2.2
Independent	Jason Foster	288	16.7	N/A
Liberal Democrats	Ingrid Ruth Schmeising-Barnes	186	10.8	+5.6
Turnout		1,723	27.16	
Registered electors		6,365		
Rejected ballots		6	0.3	
Conservative gain from Independent Health Concern				
Conservative gain from Independent Health Concern				
Conservative hold				

John Thomas had been a Health Concern councillor prior to the election.

=== Bewdley and Rock ===
Bewdley and Rock
Party	Candidate	Votes	%	±%
Conservative	Emily Elizabeth Bourne	939	42.8	+3.0
Conservative	Daniel Morehead (Dan Morehead)	841	38.3	+2.7
Conservative	Nicholas Charles Wilson (Nick Wilson)	723	33.0	−2.0
Labour	Rodney Stanczyszyn (Rod Stanczyszyn)	685	31.2	−2.5
Independent	Calne Elaine Edginton-White*	629	28.7	−10.2
Labour	Nigel Knowles	608	27.7	N/A
Green	Janice Christine Bell	461	21.0	N/A
Independent	Anna Coleman*	372	17.0	−22.8
Green	Nigel Alastair Geary	297	13.5	N/A
Independent	Roger Hugh Coleman*	253	11.5	−24.1
Liberal Democrats	Cloud Gollop	156	7.1	N/A
Turnout		2,194	31.74	
Registered electors		6,985		
Rejected ballots		23	1.0	
Conservative hold				
Conservative hold				
Conservative gain from Independent				

Anna Coleman and Roger Coleman had both been elected as Conservatives but left the party in 2020 and joined Health Concern. Seat change compared to 2019 result.

=== Blakebrook and Habberley South ===
Blakebrook and Habberley South
Party	Candidate	Votes	%	±%
Green	Victoria Ann Caulfield* (Vicky Caulfield)	765	42.7	+8.5
Conservative	Tracey Lee Onslow-Fage* (Tracey Onslow)	690	38.5	−1.4
Labour	Leigh Whitehouse*	678	37.8	+4.1
Conservative	Juliet Denise Smith	551	30.7	−1.1
Green	John Edward Davis	511	28.5	N/A
Conservative	Edward James Stokes	505	28.2	−2.4
Green	Anthony Clive Wood (Clive Wood)	385	21.5	N/A
Liberal Democrats	Adrian Stanley Beavis	212	11.8	−14.6
Liberal Democrats	Heidi Ruth Worth	187	10.4	N/A
Liberal Democrats	Simon Ford	114	6.4	N/A
Turnout		1,793	26.23	
Registered electors		6,851		
Rejected ballots		4	0.2	
Green hold				
Conservative hold				
Labour hold				

=== Broadwaters ===
Broadwaters
Party	Candidate	Votes	%	±%
Independent	Mary Alice Rayner*	893	60.3	+20.0
Labour	Mary McDonnell	634	42.8	+15.9
Independent	Peter Winston Montgomery Young*	611	41.3	+3.2
Liberal Democrats	Alan John Totty*	431	29.1	+8.1
Conservative	Tony Andrew Muir	373	25.2	+4.8
Conservative	Craig James Pedley	354	23.9	N/A
Conservative	Howard Stuart Williams	252	17.0	N/A
Turnout		1,481	22.39	
Registered electors		6,674		
Rejected ballots		13	0.9	
Independent hold				
Labour hold				
Independent gain from Independent Health Concern				

Peter Young was a Health Concern councillor prior to the election; seat shown as independent gain from Health Concern to allow comparison with 2019 results.

=== Foley Park and Hoobrook ===
Foley Park and Hoobrook
Party	Candidate	Votes	%	±%
Conservative	Nathan John Desmond*	834	48.9	+8.0
Conservative	Nichola Lynnette Gale* (Nicky Gale)	742	43.5	+9.9
Conservative	Kevin George Gale	694	40.7	+2.9
Labour	Diane Constance Smith (Di Smith)	561	32.9	+15.9
Liberal Democrats	Clare Cassidy	449	26.3	+11.4
Green	Douglas Peter Hine (Doug Hine)	346	20.3	N/A
Green	Nicholas Atkinson (Nick Atkinson)	278	16.3	N/A
Independent	Susan Caroline Meekings (Sue Meekings)	262	15.3	−17.1
Green	David John Finch (Dave Finch)	254	14.9	−6.1
Turnout		1,707	23.16	
Registered electors		7,383		
Rejected ballots		3	0.2	
Conservative hold				
Conservative hold				
Conservative hold				

=== Franche and Habberley North ===
Franche and Habberley North
Party	Candidate	Votes	%	±%
Conservative	Benjamin Richard Brookes* (Ben Brookes)	823	41.6	+13.6
Conservative	George Anthony Connolly	793	40.1	N/A
Conservative	David Richard Ross*	747	37.8	+13.9
Labour	John Beckingham	685	34.6	+6.6
Liberal Democrats	Jackie Anne Madden	551	27.9	N/A
Liberal Democrats	Oliver Yasha Walker	526	26.6	+12.7
Independent	Mark Watkins	492	24.9	N/A
Green	Lisa Jane Allsopp	398	20.1	+5.9
Turnout		1,978	26.46	
Registered electors		7,505		
Rejected ballots		8	0.4	
Conservative gain from Independent Health Concern				
Conservative gain from Independent Health Concern				
Conservative gain from Independent Health Concern				

Ben Brookes and David Ross had previously won their seats in by-elections in 2021 and 2022; their seats shown as Conservative gains from Health Concern to allow comparison with 2019 results.

=== Lickhill ===
Lickhill
Party	Candidate	Votes	%	±%
Conservative	David Little	266	40.7	+6.6
Liberal Democrats	Timothy Francis Schmeising-Barnes (Tim Schmeising-Barnes)	145	22.2	+13.3
Labour	William Stephen Thorneycroft	137	20.9	+5.5
Independent	Dixon Raymond Sheppard*	106	16.2	−21.0
Turnout		654	31.03	
Registered electors		2,127		
Rejected ballots		6	0.9	
Conservative gain from Independent Health Concern				

Dixon Sheppard was a Health Concern councillor prior to the election.

=== Mitton ===
Mitton
Party	Candidate	Votes	%	±%
Independent	Nicola Jayne Martin* (Nicky Martin)	771	41.1	−11.7
Labour	Jacqueline Elizabeth Griffiths (Jackie Griffiths)	733	39.1	+17.7
Conservative	Christopher John Rogers* (Chris Rogers)	733	39.1	+4.6
Conservative	Dale Morris	684	36.4	+9.6
Conservative	Berenice Susan Dawes*	638	34.0	+0.3
Green	Michael Timothy Allarton	546	29.1	+6.9
Liberal Democrats	Peter Christopher Pratt (Chris Pratt)	471	25.1	+13.4
Turnout		1,877	25.05	
Registered electors		7,502		
Rejected ballots		2	0.1	
Independent gain from Independent Health Concern				
Labour gain from Conservative				
Conservative hold				

Nicky Martin had been a Health Concern councillor prior to the election; seat shown as independent gain from Health Concern.

=== Offmore and Comberton ===
Offmore and Comberton
Party	Candidate	Votes	%	±%
Liberal Democrats	Frances Mary Oborski* (Fran Oborski)	777	39.4	−17.2
Liberal Democrats	Shazu Miah*	685	34.7	−11.2
Labour	Liam Denzel Peter Carroll	599	30.4	+11.5
Liberal Democrats	Nigel John Grace	561	28.4	−15.9
Conservative	Rosemary Elizabeth Bishop (Rose Bishop)	548	27.8	+7.3
Conservative	William Thomas Hopkins (Bill Hopkins)	482	24.4	+6.0
Conservative	Martin John Stooke	438	22.2	N/A
Independent	Oliver Swain (Ollie Swain)	438	22.2	N/A
Green	Brett Raymond Caulfield	326	16.5	N/A
Turnout		1,973	27.12	
Registered electors		7,308		
Rejected ballots		9	0.5	
Liberal Democrats hold				
Liberal Democrats hold				
Labour gain from Liberal Democrats				

=== Wribbenhall and Arley ===
Wribbenhall and Arley
Party	Candidate	Votes	%	±%
Conservative	Paul Harrison*	692	48.0	+6.0
Conservative	John Frederick Byng*	685	47.5	+6.6
Labour	Nicole Harper	426	29.5	+4.1
Green	Corinne Lesley Bailey	272	18.9	−6.8
Independent	Pauline Watkins	256	17.8	N/A
Green	Robert Charles Ireland (Rob Ireland)	208	14.4	N/A
Liberal Democrats	Christopher John Harvey (Chris Harvey)	129	8.9	N/A
Turnout		1,442	33.82	
Registered electors		4,284		
Rejected ballots		7	0.5	
Conservative hold				
Conservative hold				

=== Wyre Forest Rural ===
Wyre Forest Rural
Party	Candidate	Votes	%	±%
Conservative	Marcus John Hart*	1,433	55.9	+14.6
Conservative	Robin Macdonald Drew	1,325	51.7	+16.2
Conservative	Ian David Hardiman*	1,222	47.7	+5.6
Labour	Dean Anthony Cox	886	34.6	+15.3
Labour	David Paul Jones	809	31.6	+13.7
Green	Katherine Spohrer (Kate Spohrer)	378	14.8	−0.9
Green	Gilda Maria Davis	336	13.1	N/A
Liberal Democrats	Marcin Gorecki	291	11.4	N/A
Green	Dean Jon Warren	200	7.8	N/A
Turnout		2,563	33.95	
Registered electors		7,597		
Rejected ballots		16	0.6	
Conservative hold				
Conservative hold				
Conservative hold				

== Changes 2023–2027 ==
- By April 2025: Fran Oborski and Shazu Miah (Offmore and Comberton) left the Liberal Democrats to join the Liberal Party.
- By April 2025: Leigh Whitehouse (Blakebrook and Habberley South) left the Labour Party to sit as an independent, joining the Independent and Green group.
- By June 2026: Paul Harrison (Wribbenhall and Arley) left the Conservatives to join Reform UK.
- By June 2026: Ben Brookes (Franche and Habberley North) left the Conservatives to sit as a non-aligned independent.
