= Old Town Hall, Torquay =

Municipal building in Torquay, Devon, England

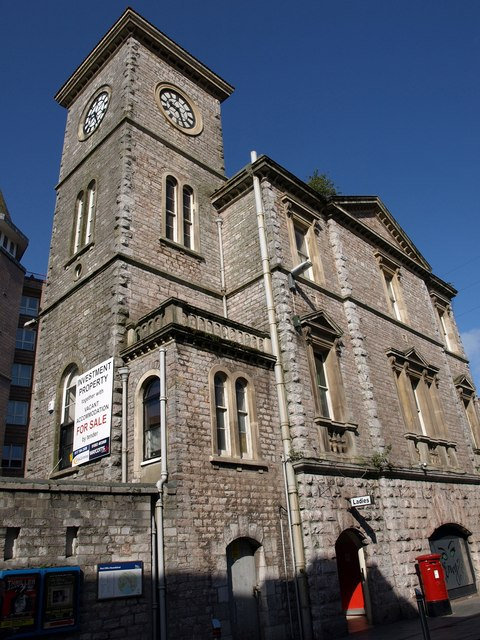
- Old Town Hall, Torquay

- Shown in Devon
- 50.4652°N 3.5274°W
- Location: Union Street, Torquay

History
- Built: 1852

Site notes
- Architect: Mr Dixon
- Architectural style: Italianate style

Listed Building – Grade II
- Official name: Old Town Hall, Union Street
- Designated: 10 January 1975
- Reference no.: 1291593

The Old Town Hall is a former municipal building in Union Street, Torquay, Devon, England. The building, which was the headquarters of Torquay Borough Council until 1911, is a Grade II listed building.

== History ==
The new local board of health for Tormoham, as the area was then known, treated the commissioning of a town hall as a key priority after it was formed in 1850. The building was designed by a Mr Dixon in the Italianate style, built in limestone and was completed in June 1852.

The design featured a three-stage bell tower on the corner of Abbey Road and Union Street; there was a round headed window in the first stage, twin lancet windows in the second stage and, originally, a triple-lancet arrangement of bell louvres in the third stage, with a modillioned cornice and a shallow hipped roof above. On the Union Street elevation, the central section of three bays, which projected forward, featured a wide opening on the ground floor, a pedimented Venetian window with a balustrade on the first floor and a sash window with a cornice supported by brackets on the second floor. The outer bays featured round headed openings on the ground floor, pedimented sash windows with balustrades and cornices supported by brackets on the first floor and unpedimented sash windows with cornices supported by brackets on the second floor. At roof level, there was a modillioned pediment above the central section and a modillioned cornice above the outer bays. Internally, the upper floors were used for the civic rooms while the basement and the ground floor were used as a lock-up for petty criminals.

Following significant population growth, largely associated with the status of Torquay as a seaside resort, the area became a municipal borough with the town hall as its headquarters in 1892. A manual clock mechanism and a series of clock faces were added to the tower in the late 19th century; there is also a bell by Warner & Sons. However, in the early 20th century, with the increasing responsibilities of local authorities, civic leaders found the building too small for their needs, and the council relocated to the new town hall further to the northwest along Union Street in 1911.

The old town hall was subsequently used as office space until the mid-1950s when the first floor of the building was converted for use as a synagogue by the Torquay United Hebrew Congregation. The congregation dissolved and the synagogue closed in 2000. Meanwhile, the ground floor of the building had been re-purposed for use as ladies' and gentlemen's public toilets. In the 21st century, the first floor was converted for use as a bar, initially branded as Fat Catz and latterly branded as Bar Envy. However, after the bar closed, the building was sold at auction in December 2021.
