= Meadfoot =

Area of Torquay in Devon, England

Coordinates: 50.458°N 3.508°W

Meadfoot beach

Meadfoot rocks

Meadfoot is an area of Torquay, Devon.

Meadfoot beach is a mixture of rock, stone and sandy areas. At the rocky eastern end there is a cliff and a car park, which gives access to a boat launching ramp. The western end is more sandy and has facilities such as a cafe and beach huts. Beyond the beach, the road is adjacent to a cliff and there are parking spaces along the bottom of this. It is a common sight to see people fishing from the rocks. It is generally known as a local's beach due to its location away from the more popular tourist areas of Babbacombe and Torre Abbey. The Osbourne hotel overlooks the beach. Meadfoot beach has won the prestigious European blue flag award for the quality of its water. There are new 2 storey beach huts at one end, that cost to build in excess of £1,600,000.

In 1861, Charles Darwin, author of On the Origin of Species, stayed at 2 Hesketh Crescent, situated at the south-west end of Meadfoot Sea Road. Also, Dame Agatha Christie used to stay with her friends, the Lucy family at Hesketh Crescent.
