= 2023 Torbay Council election =

2023 local election in Torbay

- 4 May 2023

All 36 seats on Torbay Council 19 seats needed for a majority

	First party	Second party	Third party
Leader	David Thomas	Steve Darling	Robert Loxton
Party	Conservative	Liberal Democrats	Independent
Last election	15	13	8
Seats before	14 (Note: Including one vacant seat previously held by Conservative Jane Barnby until her death in February 2023.)	12	10
Seats won	19	15	2
Seats after	19	15	2
Seat change	▲4	▲2	▼6
Popular vote	30,891	25,615	5,962
Percentage	44.1%	36.6%	8.5%
- Winner of each seat at the 2023 Torbay Council election
Leader before election
Steve Darling
Liberal Democrats
No overall control
Leader after election
David Thomas
Conservative

The 2023 Torbay Council election was held on 4 May 2023 to elect members of Torbay Council in England. It coincided with local elections across the United Kingdom.

Before the election, the council was controlled by a coalition between the Liberal Democrats, with 12 seats, and Independents, with 10 seats. The largest party was the Conservatives with 13 seats. There was one vacancy following the death of Jane Barnby in February 2023.

Torbay, along with North Kesteven and Wyre Forest, were the only three councils gained by the Conservatives. Conservative leader David Thomas was appointed leader of the council at the subsequent annual council meeting on 16 May 2023.

== Voter requirements ==
To vote, residents must have registered by midnight on 17 April. Following the Elections Act 2022, voters at polling stations will need valid photo id. Voters who do not have one of the approved types of id can apply for a Voter Authority Certificate. The deadline for applying for this election is 5 pm on 25 April.

== Wards ==
The distribution of seats by ward is:

Ward	Seats
Barton with Watcombe	3
Churston with Galmpton	2
Clifton with Maidenway	2
Cockington with Chelston	2
Collaton St Mary	1
Ellacombe	2
Furzeham with Summercombe	3
Goodrington with Roselands	2
Kings Ash	2
Preston	3
Roundham with Hyde	2
Shiphay	2
St Marychurch	3
St Peters with St Marys	2
Tormohun	3
Wellswood	2
Total	36

== Summary ==
=== Election result ===
2023 Torbay Council election
Party	Candidates	Seats	Gains	Losses	Net gain/loss	Seats %	Votes %	Votes	+/−
Conservative	36	19	8	4	▲4	52.8	44.1	30,891	+9.9
Liberal Democrats	36	15	4	2	▲2	41.7	36.6	25,615	+8.8
Independent	13	2	0	6	▼6	5.6	8.5	5,962	–11.3
Green	19	0	0	0	Steady	0.0	8.2	5,751	–0.2
Labour	5	0	0	0	Steady	0.0	2.0	1,422	–3.4
TUSC	3	0	0	0	Steady	0.0	0.4	287	N/A
Workers Party	1	0	0	0	Steady	0.0	0.2	149	N/A

== Ward results ==
The statement of persons nominated was published on 5 April 2023. Incumbent councillors are marked with an asterisk (*), except councillors running in a new ward who are marked with a dagger (†).

=== Barton with Watcombe ===
Barton with Watcombe (3 seats)
Party	Candidate	Votes	%	±%
Liberal Democrats	Steve Darling*	1,247	57.1	+1.8
Liberal Democrats	Mike Fox	1,121	51.4	+3.9
Liberal Democrats	Swithin Long*	1,070	49.0	+5.4
Conservative	Kim Tracey Brook	684	31.3	+2.7
Conservative	Damian Barton	647	29.6	+6.2
Conservative	David John Watkins	563	25.8	+3.7
Labour	Gary Christopher Hunt	286	13.1	+4.3
Green	Mick Tait	259	11.9	−0.1
Independent	Bjorn Gunter Lauer	126	5.8	N/A
Turnout		2,192	25.51	
Registered electors		8,594		
Rejected ballots		9	0.4	
Liberal Democrats hold		Swing		
Liberal Democrats hold		Swing		
Liberal Democrats hold		Swing		

=== Churston with Galmpton ===
Churston with Galmpton (2 seats)
Party	Candidate	Votes	%	±%
Conservative	Adam Simon Billings	1,155	49.1	−5.3
Conservative	Alan John Tyerman	1,039	44.2	−10.1
Independent	Karen Ann Kennedy*	787	33.5	−18.8
Liberal Democrats	Dennis Ronald Shearman	449	19.1	−2.0
Green	Richard Wingate Spreckley	397	16.9	−6.0
Liberal Democrats	Dan Reed	362	15.4	−1.4
Green	Alan Wyatt	189	8.0	N/A
Turnout		2,360	39.24	
Registered electors		6,015		
Rejected ballots		9	0.4	
Conservative hold		Swing		
Conservative hold		Swing		

=== Clifton with Maidenway ===
Clifton with Maidenway (2 seats)
Party	Candidate	Votes	%	±%
Liberal Democrats	Maggi Douglas-Dunbar*	1,004	53.7	+10.5
Liberal Democrats	Cat Johns*	982	52.6	+7.2
Conservative	Peter Bernhard Henry Middleton	730	39.1	+9.5
Conservative	Iain Leanard Palmer	616	33.0	+7.2
Green	Sue Kenning	260	13.9	−0.2
Turnout		1,879	30.88	
Registered electors		6,084		
Rejected ballots		11	0.6	
Liberal Democrats hold		Swing		
Liberal Democrats hold		Swing		

=== Cockington with Chelston ===
Cockington with Chelston (2 seats)
Party	Candidate	Votes	%	±%
Independent	Nicole Jeanne Amil*	789	38.3	−3.8
Conservative	Mark Anthony Thomas Spacagna	744	36.1	+15.2
Conservative	Andrew John Barrand*	682	33.1	+9.3
Independent	Julie Diane Brandon	528	25.6	N/A
Liberal Democrats	Hans Windheuser	360	17.5	+3.6
Liberal Democrats	Alistair Kevin Brierley	324	15.7	+3.2
Labour	Daniel William Clemence	255	12.4	−7.9
Green	Jimi Neary	214	10.4	+0.8
Turnout		2,062	34.09	
Registered electors		6,049		
Rejected ballots		3	0.1	
Independent hold		Swing		
Conservative hold		Swing		

=== Collaton St Mary ===
Collaton St Mary (1 seat)
Party	Candidate	Votes	%	±%
Conservative	Martin Robert Brook	325	45.2	+3.5
Liberal Democrats	Katherine Norma Oliverio	225	31.3	+14.8
Green	Kate Prendergast	169	23.5	+2.5
Turnout		723	29.88	
Registered electors		2,420		
Rejected ballots		4	0.6	
Conservative hold		Swing		

=== Ellacombe ===
Ellacombe (2 seats)
Party	Candidate	Votes	%	±%
Liberal Democrats	Jermaine Atiya-Alla*	752	52.8	+25.0
Liberal Democrats	Yannis Matthew Nicolaou	712	50.0	+23.7
Conservative	Anne Martine Madge Brooks†	462	32.5	+12.4
Conservative	Melodie Anne Ripley	404	28.4	+8.5
Green	Hazel Robertson	201	14.1	±0.0
Workers Party	Paul Andrew Moor	149	10.5	N/A
Turnout		1,432	24.61	
Registered electors		5,819		
Rejected ballots		9	0.6	
Liberal Democrats hold		Swing		
Liberal Democrats hold		Swing		

=== Furzeham with Summercombe ===
Furzeham with Summercombe (3 seats)
Party	Candidate	Votes	%	±%
Conservative	Andrew Paul Strang	1,148	47.1	+29.8
Conservative	Hannah Emily Stevens	960	39.4	+24.2
Conservative	Jason Richard Hutchings	898	36.8	+24.2
Independent	Jackie Stockman*	882	36.2	−17.5
Independent	Bob Hyde	525	21.5	N/A
Green	John Fallon	473	19.4	+3.0
Independent	Paul David Greenwood	461	18.9	N/A
Green	Robert Charles Bagnall	329	13.5	N/A
Liberal Democrats	Ben Davis	317	13.0	+6.4
Liberal Democrats	Paul Corcoran	293	12.0	+6.0
Independent	Michael Leon Roseveare	292	12.0	N/A
Liberal Democrats	Andy Ford	262	10.7	+5.7
Turnout		2,449	30.53	
Registered electors		8,022		
Rejected ballots		10	0.4	
Conservative gain from Independent		Swing		
Conservative gain from Independent		Swing		
Conservative gain from Independent		Swing		

=== Goodrington with Roselands ===
Goodrington with Roselands (2 seats)
Party	Candidate	Votes	%	±%
Conservative	John Richard Fellows	942	48.8	+16.6
Conservative	Hayley Jeanette Tranter	843	43.6	+18.2
Liberal Democrats	Tom Pentney	709	36.7	+0.8
Liberal Democrats	Matt Pope	593	30.7	−3.5
Labour	Steve Radford	258	13.4	+6.1
Green	Sara Palmer	247	12.8	+1.8
Turnout		1,948	33.13	
Registered electors		5,880		
Rejected ballots		16	0.8	
Conservative gain from Liberal Democrats		Swing		
Conservative gain from Liberal Democrats		Swing		

=== Kings Ash ===
Kings Ash (2 seats)
Party	Candidate	Votes	%	±%
Conservative	Jackie Thomas*	621	46.7	+17.5
Conservative	Yvonne Marie Twelves	555	41.7	+9.9
Liberal Democrats	Davina Jit Kaur Luther	445	33.4	+13.0
Liberal Democrats	Beth Dring	426	32.0	+15.7
Labour	Eddie Harris	219	16.5	+0.7
Green	Neil Owen Rolfe	196	14.7	−4.0
TUSC	Neil Cussons	74	5.6	N/A
Turnout		1,337	23.82	
Registered electors		5,613		
Rejected ballots		6	0.4	
Conservative hold		Swing		
Conservative hold		Swing		

=== Preston ===
Preston (3 seats)
Party	Candidate	Votes	%	±%
Conservative	Chris Lewis*	1,586	56.8	+8.8
Conservative	Barbara Anne Lewis†	1,567	56.1	+12.7
Conservative	David Michael Thomas*	1,442	51.6	+12.2
Liberal Democrats	Bob Cross	883	31.6	+10.0
Liberal Democrats	Dave Law	863	30.9	+12.6
Liberal Democrats	Dean Barry Rollings	705	25.2	+10.1
Green	Sophie Downs	633	22.7	+4.8
Turnout		2,810	34.65	
Registered electors		8,110		
Rejected ballots		16	0.6	
Conservative hold		Swing		
Conservative hold		Swing		
Conservative hold		Swing		

=== Roundham with Hyde ===
Roundham with Hyde (2 seats)
Party	Candidate	Votes	%	±%
Liberal Democrats	Chris Carter*	747	46.4	+13.2
Liberal Democrats	Nigel John Penny	668	41.5	+13.4
Conservative	Alan Craig Whytock	639	39.7	+6.0
Conservative	Daniel Lawrence Boatwright	620	38.5	+9.6
Green	Jane Hughes	302	18.8	+2.7
Turnout		1,627	25.73	
Registered electors		6,323		
Rejected ballots		17	1.0	
Liberal Democrats hold		Swing		
Liberal Democrats gain from Conservative		Swing		

=== Shiphay ===
Shiphay (2 seats)
Party	Candidate	Votes	%	±%
Independent	Darren John Cowell*	667	38.2	−2.6
Conservative	Katya Maddison	583	33.4	+5.8
Conservative	Josh Barrand	575	32.9	+7.4
Independent	Rob Loxton*	553	31.6	−6.8
Liberal Democrats	Ann Ashworth	319	18.2	−1.4
Green	Jenny Stoneman	212	12.1	−0.9
Liberal Democrats	Fiona Jane Hess	190	10.9	−4.8
Independent	Mark Dent	92	5.3	N/A
Independent	Kurt Lewis Napper	64	3.7	N/A
TUSC	Stuart Kenneth Gale	62	3.5	−4.3
Turnout		1,758	28.91	
Registered electors		6,080		
Rejected ballots		10	0.6	
Independent hold		Swing		
Conservative gain from Independent		Swing		

=== St Marychurch ===
St Marychurch (3 seats)
Party	Candidate	Votes	%	±%
Liberal Democrats	George Andrew Darling	1,568	50.6	+20.7
Liberal Democrats	Kelly Louise Stephanie Harvey	1,537	49.6	+21.2
Liberal Democrats	Ras Virdee	1,374	44.3	+17.8
Conservative	Hazel Margaret Foster*	1,301	42.0	+8.1
Conservative	Paul Evan Jones	1,186	38.3	+6.4
Conservative	Roger Kenneth Heath	1,080	34.8	+3.3
Green	Jenny Giel	502	16.2	+2.8
Turnout		3,116	34.07	
Registered electors		9,147		
Rejected ballots		16	0.5	
Liberal Democrats gain from Conservative		Swing		
Liberal Democrats gain from Conservative		Swing		
Liberal Democrats gain from Conservative		Swing		

=== St Peters with St Marys ===
St Peters with St Marys (2 seats)
Party	Candidate	Votes	%	±%
Conservative	Anna Joan Tolchard	746	47.5	+21.8
Conservative	Steve Bryant	744	47.4	+14.9
Liberal Democrats	David John Giles	517	33.0	+23.6
Liberal Democrats	Dave Fordham	472	30.1	+22.0
Green	Poppy Hopkins	307	19.6	−3.1
Green	Stephen Linley-Shaw	259	16.5	N/A
Turnout		1,580	29.18	
Registered electors		5,414		
Rejected ballots		11	0.7	
Conservative gain from Independent		Swing		
Conservative gain from Independent		Swing		

=== Tormohun ===
Tormohun (3 seats)
Party	Candidate	Votes	%	±%
Liberal Democrats	Mandy Darling*	1,087	48.8	+4.3
Liberal Democrats	Nick Pentney*	953	42.8	+4.6
Liberal Democrats	Cordelia Louise Law*	943	42.3	+5.2
Conservative	Denise Ann Sinclair	692	31.1	+6.7
Conservative	Brian Raymond Lownds-Pateman	678	30.4	+8.1
Conservative	Robert Stanley Summers	649	29.1	+7.7
Labour	Olivia Catherine Bath	404	18.1	+7.5
Green	Helen Margaret Boyles	330	14.8	+3.0
Independent	Robert Martin Excell	196	8.8	−9.2
TUSC	Michelle Goodman	151	6.8	N/A
Turnout		2,242	24.22	
Registered electors		9,257		
Rejected ballots		14	0.6	
Liberal Democrats hold		Swing		
Liberal Democrats hold		Swing		
Liberal Democrats hold		Swing		

=== Wellswood ===
Wellswood (2 seats)
Party	Candidate	Votes	%	±%
Conservative	Nick Bye*	1,482	66.6	+10.3
Conservative	Patrick Antony Joyce	1,303	58.6	+9.6
Liberal Democrats	Pamela Jane Bagnall	582	26.2	+5.4
Liberal Democrats	Dennis Brewer	554	24.9	+15.2
Green	Richard Boyles	272	12.2	−2.1
Turnout		2,235	37.72	
Registered electors		5,926		
Rejected ballots		11	0.5	
Conservative hold		Swing		
Conservative hold		Swing		

== Changes 2023-2027 ==
Wellswood councillor Patrick Joyce and Shiphay councillor Katya Maddison left the Conservative group in October 2023 to form a new group, Prosper Torbay, with Maddison as leader and Joyce as deputy leader.

Furzeham with Summercombe councillor Jason Hutchings left the Conservative group to sit as an independent, confirmed 22 May 2025, saying he felt "held back" within the group.

=== By-elections ===
==== Wellswood ====
The by-election was triggered by the death of Prosper Torbay councillor Patrick Joyce on 12 April 2024.

Wellswood: 6 June 2024
Party	Candidate	Votes	%	±%
Conservative	Hazel Foster	938	42.3	–21.1
Liberal Democrats	Peter Fenton	929	41.9	+17.0
Reform	Mike Lister	188	8.5	N/A
Labour	Jonathan Chant-Stevens	117	5.3	N/A
Green	Jenny Giel	34	1.5	–10.1
Independent	Paul Moor	11	0.5	N/A
Majority		9	0.4	
Turnout		2,223	38.4	+0.7
Registered electors		5,799		
Conservative hold		Swing	▼19.1	
