= Regional theatre =

Regional theatre may refer to:

- Community theatre
- Regional theater in the United States
