= SHS Drinks =

British alcoholic beverage company

SHS Drinks Limited
- Formerly: Beverage Brands (U.K.) Limited (1993–2023)
- Company type: Subsidiary
- Industry: Alcoholic beverages
- Incorporated: 8 March 1993; 33 years ago
- Founded: 1992; 34 years ago
- Founder: Joe Woods
- Area served: Worldwide
- Products: WKD Original Vodka; Cider
- Parent: SHS Group Limited
- Website: shs-drinks.co.uk

SHS Drinks Limited (formerly Beverage Brands (U.K.) Limited) is a British alcoholic beverage company.

== History ==
Beverage Brands was founded in 1992 by Joe Woods (born 1954 or 1955). It was founded in Torquay, Devon. Woods was born in Greenock, and grew up in Torquay, having moved there aged 11. Originally based on the harbour, the company moved to Rockwood House on Parkhill Road in 2000.

Beverage Brands (U.K.) Limited was officially incorporated on 8 March 1993. SHS Group Limited took controlling interest of Beverage Brands in 1993.

In May 2011, the company announced that it was leaving the county of Devon. On 12 December 2022, the company proposed a name change, to SHS Drinks Limited, and this became official on 16 January 2023.

== Products ==
Its main product is WKD Original Vodka, which is the market leading ready to drink (RTD) alcoholic beverage in Ireland and the UK. WKD sells £258 million in the UK. In 2009 it produced a cider called WKD Core.

It produced Woody's from December 1995; from July 2001 it became Woody's Vodka Refresher, and sold until December 2003, then relaunched in September 2008.

Beverage Brands is the sixth largest manufacturer of RTDs in the world.

== Structure ==
The company is based off junction 11a of the M5, off the B4641 in Hucclecote.

It was based in Torquay from 1992 until 2011; the main bottling plants is on the Cumnock Business Park in Netherthird, East Ayrshire at the A76/B7083 roundabout, with another at Shepton Mallet.
