= Torbay Council =

Unitary local authority of Torbay, Devon, England

- Coat of arms

- Council logo

Type
- Type: Unitary authority of Torbay

History
- Founded: 1 April 1968

Leadership
- Mayor: Hazel Foster, Conservative since 14 May 2026
- Leader: David Thomas, Conservative since 16 May 2023
- Chief Executive: Anne-Marie Bond since 2021

Structure
- Seats: 36 councillors
- Political groups: Administration (17) Conservative (17) Other parties (19) Liberal Democrats (15) Independent (4)
- Length of term: Whole council elected every four years

Elections
- Voting system: Plurality-at-large
- Last election: 4 May 2023
- Next election: 6 May 2027

Motto
- Salus et Felicitas (Health and Happiness)

Meeting place
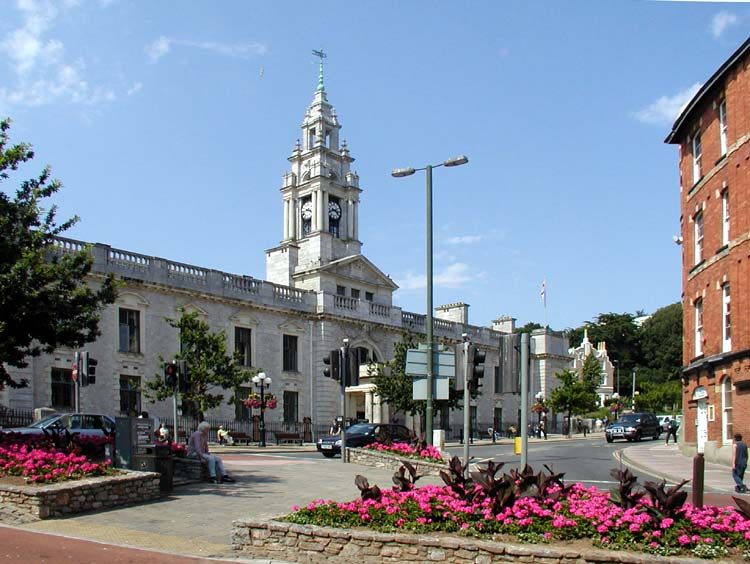
- Town Hall, Castle Circus, Torquay, TQ1 3DR

Website
- www.torbay.gov.uk

Constitution
- The Constitution of the Council of the Borough of Torbay

Torbay Council is the local authority for Torbay, a local government district in the ceremonial county of Devon, England. Since 1998 the council has been a unitary authority, being a district council which also performs the functions of a county council; it is independent from Devon County Council.

The council has been under no overall control since 2023, being led by a Conservative minority administration. It is based at the Town Hall in Torquay.

== History ==
The council was created on 1 April 1968 to govern the county borough of Torbay, which replaced the abolished municipal borough of Torquay, urban districts of Brixham and Paignton and civil parish of Churston Ferrers. The council's formal title on creation in 1968 was the "mayor, aldermen and burgesses of the borough of Torbay", informally known as the corporation or borough council. As a county borough, the council provided all local government services for the area.

Six years later local government was reorganised again, under the Local Government Act 1972. Torbay kept the same boundaries, but on 1 April 1974 it became a non-metropolitan district, with Devon County Council once more providing county-level services to the area. Torbay retained borough status, allowing the council to take the name "Torbay Borough Council" and letting the chair of the council take the title of mayor, continuing Torbay's series of mayors which had started in 1968.

Torbay regained its independence from the county council on 1 April 1998. The way this change was implemented was to create a new non-metropolitan county of Torbay matching the borough, but with no separate county council. Instead, the existing borough council took on county council functions, making it a unitary authority. Since 1998 the council has styled itself "Torbay Council". Torbay remains part of the ceremonial county of Devon for the purposes of lieutenancy.

Between 2005 and 2019 the council had a directly elected mayor. Since 2019 political leadership has instead been provided by a leader of the council.

Since 2025 the council has been a member of the Devon and Torbay Combined County Authority.

== Governance ==
As a unitary authority, Torbay Council has the responsibilities of both a district council and county council combined. In its capacity as a district council it is a billing authority collecting Council Tax and business rates, and its responsibilities include town planning, housing, waste collection and environmental health. In its capacity as a county council it is a local education authority, and responsible for social services, libraries and waste disposal.

Torbay Council appoints two members to the Devon and Somerset Combined Fire Authority and appoints one member to the Devon and Cornwall Police and Crime Panel. The Torbay Health and Wellbeing Board is made up of representatives from Torbay Council and other local healthcare organisations.

=== Political control ===
The council has been under no overall control since 2023. Following the May 2023 elections the Conservatives had a majority of the seats, but they lost their majority in October that year when two Conservative members left the party to form a new group, Prosper Torbay. The Conservatives won a by-election in June 2024, giving them exactly half the seats on the council, so one seat short of an overall majority. The Conservatives were therefore able to govern by relying on the Conservative mayor's casting vote. When it came to appoint a new mayor in May 2024 there was a two-month delay to the appointment as the Conservatives tried to block the appointment of a Liberal Democrat as mayor, eventually succeeding in July 2024 with a Conservative being given the role instead.

Political control of the council since the 1974 reforms has been as follows:

Lower-tier non-metropolitan district

Party in control	Years
Conservative	1974–1990
No overall control	1990–1991
Liberal Democrats	1991–1998

Unitary authority

Party in control	Years
Liberal Democrats	1998–2000
Conservative	2000–2003
Liberal Democrats	2003–2007
Conservative	2007–2019
No overall control	2019–2023
Conservative	2023–2023
No overall control	2023–present

=== Leadership ===
Prior to 2005, political leadership was provided by the leader of the council. The leaders from 1997 to 2005 were:

Councillor	Party	From	To
Ian Fenton	Liberal Democrats	13 May 1997	May 1999
Ann Williams	Liberal Democrats	11 May 1999	May 2000
Richard Cuming	Conservative	May 2000	2002
Eileen Salloway	Conservative	2002	May 2003
Chris Harris	Liberal Democrats	15 May 2003	23 Oct 2005

Between 2005 and 2019 the council had a directly elected mayor as its political leader. The directly elected mayors were:

Mayor	Party	From	To
Nick Bye	Conservative	24 Oct 2005	8 May 2011
Gordon Oliver	Conservative	9 May 2011	5 May 2019

In 2019 the council reverted to having a leader instead of a directly elected mayor. The leaders since 2019 have been:

Councillor	Party	From	To
Steve Darling	Liberal Democrats	28 May 2019	May 2023
David Thomas	Conservative	16 May 2023	

=== Composition ===
Following the 2023 election, and subsequent changes of allegiance and by-elections up to May 2025, the composition of the council was:

Party	Councillors
Conservative	17
Liberal Democrats	15
Independent	4
Total	36

Three of the independent councillors sit together as the "Independent Group" and the other is not aligned to a group.

== Premises ==
The council is based at Torquay Town Hall on Castle Circus, which had been completed in 1911 for the former Torquay Town Council.

On its creation in 1968 the council also inherited the former Paignton Urban District Council's headquarters at Oldway Mansion and the former Brixham Urban District Council's headquarters at Brixham Town Hall. Oldway Mansion was used as additional office space for the council until 2013. Brixham Town Hall was transferred to Brixham Town Council in 2011.

== Elections ==
Torbay Council wards

Since the last boundary changes in 2019 the council has comprised 36 councillors representing 16 wards, with each ward electing one, two or three councillors. Elections are held every four years.
