= Torquay pottery =

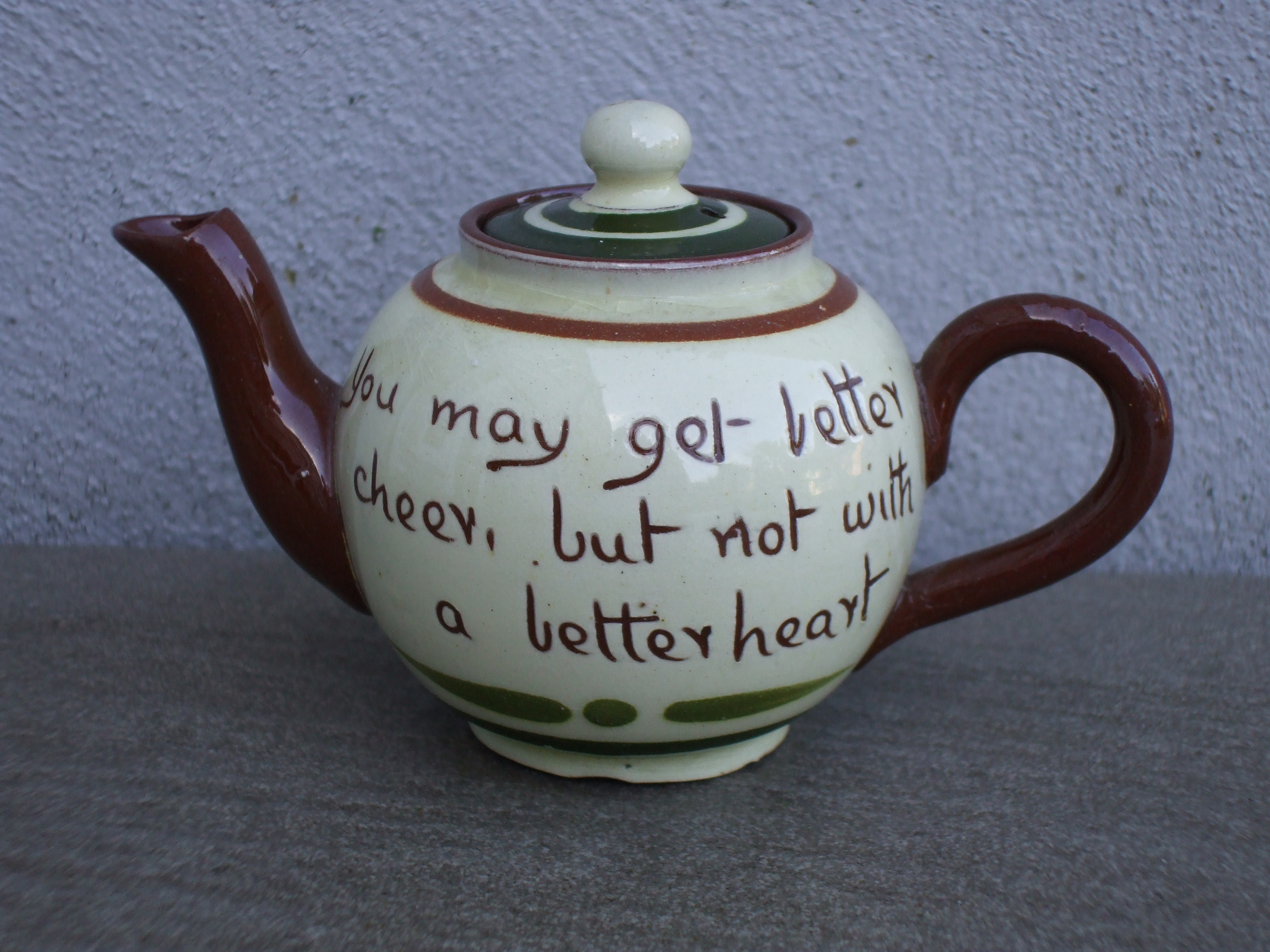
A "mottoware" teapot made at Aller Vale, using the "Scandy" pattern

Torquay pottery or Torquay ware is pottery made in Torquay, Devon, England, using local clay, at one of fifteen or so local potteries chiefly serving the tourist trade, but also supplying high-end retailers such as Liberty of London.

The most common form was mottoware - pottery such as plates or jugs decorated with inspirational or humorous text, often written in a Devon dialect, and thus known as Devon mottoware. Some items were produced in Cornish dialect, for "export" to, and sale in, Cornwall. Novelty items with no functional use were also produced, but are rarer.

The first pottery, the "Watcombe Terra Cotta Clay Company" (later Watcombe Pottery; acquired in 1901 by the nearby Aller Vale Pottery), was established in 1875 by G. J. Allen, after he discovered a particularly fine clay in the grounds of Watcombe House.

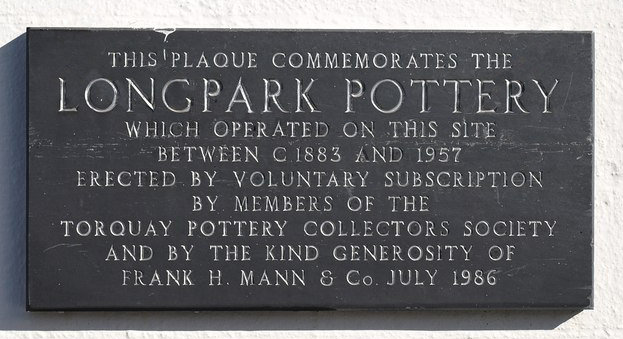
Plaque marking the site of Longpark Pottery

Other potteries included the Longpark Pottery (1883; originally the "Longpark China and Terracotta Works"), in the Long Park district, which closed in 1957; Lemon & Crute; Torquay Terra-Cotta Company; and the St. Marychurch Pottery.

Notable potters included Blanche Georgiana Vulliamy.

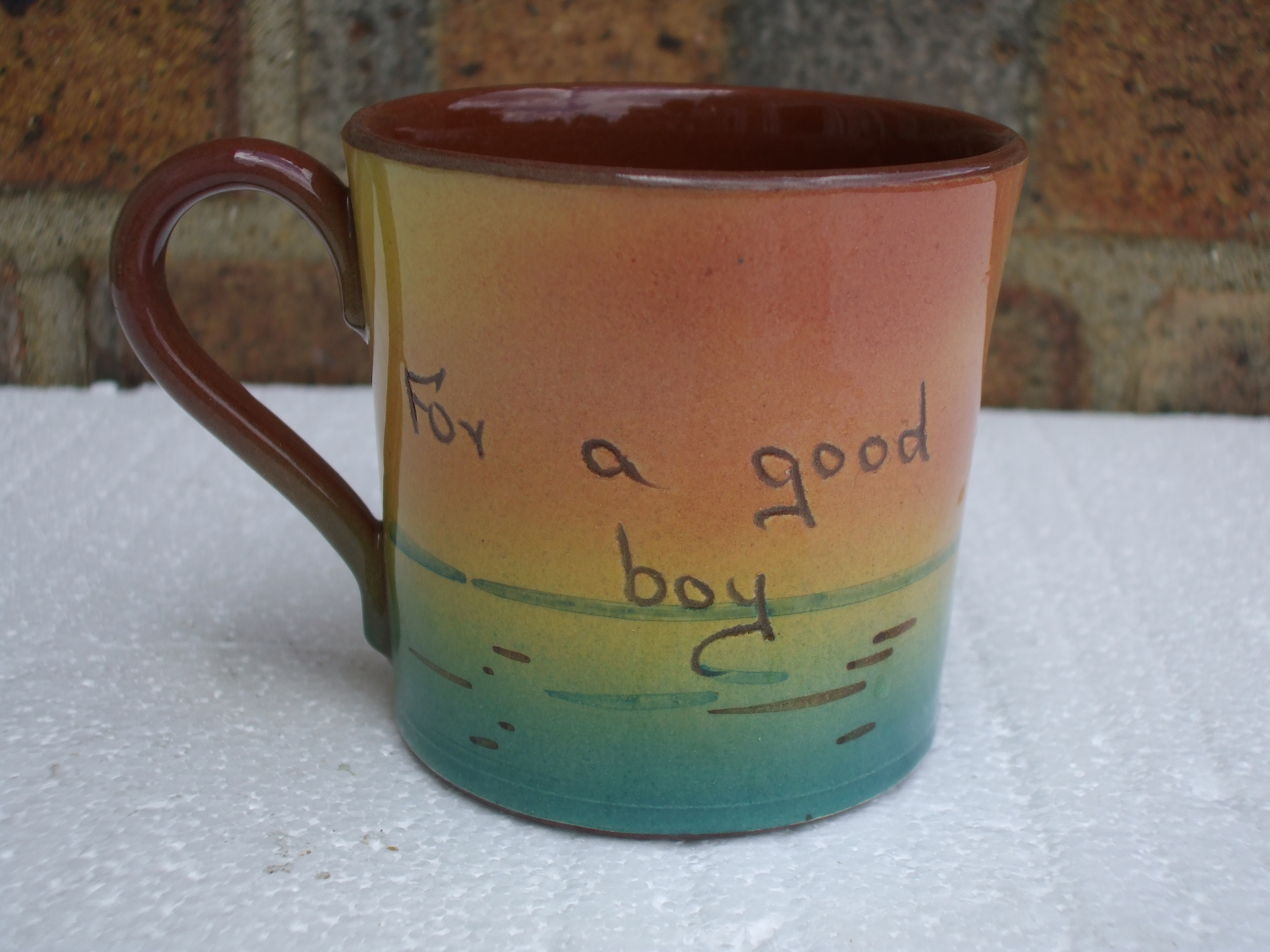
Earthenware mug inscribed "For A Good Boy"

A Torquay Pottery Collectors' Society, established in 1976, encourages the study and collection of such wares. The society organised an exhibition, "Torquay Pottery: A Local Story" at Newton Abbot Town Museum in 2001. a North American Torquay Society was formed in 1990, for the same purpose.
