= WKD Original Vodka =

Alcopop brand

- WKD logo
- Type: Vodka
- Manufacturer: SHS Drinks
- Origin: United Kingdom
- Introduced: 1996
- Alcohol by volume: 3.4%
- Related products: List of vodka brands
- Website: wkd.co.uk

WKD, pronounced as Wicked, is a brand of alcopop produced by SHS Drinks. It is sold and heavily marketed in the United Kingdom and Ireland with the slogan 'Have you got a WKD (for "wicked") side?', and also in many countries in mainland Europe. AC Nielsen ranked it as the number-one UK ready to drink (RTD) alcopop in 2006. In December 2014 to comply with alcohol tax laws and to minimise future tax increases, "Alcoholic Mix WKD" replaced the old "Original WKD", and the old Original Mix is now no longer available in either the UK or Ireland. The small change to the alcohol element of the WKD was not intended to change the taste of the product and still contains triple distilled vodka. In addition, it contains an alternative alcohol base (not wine) to minimise tax. The actual recipe remains unchanged. The WKD bottling facility in Ayrshire, Scotland closed in November 2022 due to rising costs.

== Product information ==
WKD originally contained 5.5% alcohol by volume (ABV), but this was reduced to 5% in October 2003, to 4.5% on 25 July 2005, and later to 3.4%, current as of 2025. The drink was launched in August 1996 in Scotland under the name "Wicked". Initially available in 330 ml bottles, the bottles were later reduced to 275 ml, matching other alcopops. The 275 ml bottles are sold in pubs, bars, and shops across the UK, with shops also selling multipacks of 4, 10, and 12, as well as 700 ml bottles.

== Varieties ==
=== Current varieties ===
As of 2026:

No.	Name	Information	Release date
1	WKD Blue	"Mixed-fruit" flavour	1996
2	WKD Pink Gin	Pink coloured, raspberry flavour	2021
3	WKD Iron Brew	Orange coloured, Irn-Bru flavour	1996
4	WKD Orange & Passionfruit	Amber coloured, passion fruit and orange flavour	2023
5	WKD Raspberry Lemonade	Cerise coloured, raspberry and lemon flavour	2021
6	WKD Berry Blast	Red coloured, raspberry flavour	2022
7	WKD Love Island	Purple coloured, Grape flavour	2024
8	WKD Blue Non-alcoholic	Blue Coloured, "mixed fruit" flavour, alcohol free	2024
9	WKD Cherry Ice	Dark Pink coloured, Cherry Flavour	2025

1, 2, 3, 5, 6 and 9 are sold in standard mixed multi-packs.

=== Discontinued varieties ===
- WKD Original Vodka Silver, clear, "tropical" flavour
- WKD Red, tropical fruit flavour
- WKD Blonde, apple-flavoured, but not cider-based; yellow
- WKD Core, cider-based drink, apple-flavoured, green. Introduced 2009.
- WKD Purple, "mixed berry" flavour
- WKD Green, green apple flavour
- WKD Orange, orange-flavoured and coloured
- WKD Vegas, "mixed fruit" flavour, dark purple

== Advertising ==
WKD Vodka has been heavily promoted in the UK. Promotion includes a TV advertising campaign, a national poster campaign, scoreboard sponsorship at Premiership football clubs, giving out samples in bars and clubs, sponsorship, and student tours. Their catchphrase "Have you got a WKD side?" was launched in 2000 and hit TV screens in 2001. The TV adverts feature men pulling pranks or behaving in a strange or selfish manner for the beverage.

Along with several other alcopop or RTD producers, WKD were considered by the UK ASA to be using advertising likely to appeal to under-18s, and some of their TV adverts were banned.

== Sponsorship ==
WKD was a sponsor of the "WKD Shed Sports Show" which aired on Nuts TV, which had its own channel on Freeview and Sky but closed on 15 January 2009.

WKD has been a sponsor of the "WKD Nuts Football Awards" since this annual event began in 2006.
